= 2013–14 Loyola Marymount Lions men's basketball team =

American college basketball season

2013–14 Loyola Marymount Lions men's basketball
- Conference: West Coast Conference
- Record: 13–19 (4–14 WCC)
- Head coach: Max Good (6th season)
- Assistant coaches: Myke Scholl; Tom Abatemarco; Senque Marco
- Home arena: Gersten Pavilion

2013–14 West Coast Conference men's basketball standings
	Conf.				Overall
Team	W		L	PCT	W		L	PCT
Gonzaga †	15	–	3	.833	29	–	7	.806
BYU	13	–	5	.722	23	–	12	.657
San Francisco	13	–	5	.722	21	–	12	.636
Saint Mary's	11	–	7	.611	23	–	12	.657
Pepperdine	8	–	10	.444	15	–	16	.484
San Diego	7	–	11	.389	18	–	17	.514
Portland	7	–	11	.389	15	–	16	.484
Pacific	6	–	12	.333	18	–	16	.529
Santa Clara	6	–	12	.333	14	–	19	.424
Loyola Marymount	4	–	14	.222	13	–	19	.406
† Conference tournament winner

The 2013–14 Loyola Marymount Lions men's basketball team represented Loyola Marymount University during the 2013–14 college basketball season. This Lions were coached by sixth year head coach Max Good. The Lions competed in the West Coast Conference and played their home games at Gersten Pavilion. They finished the season 13–19, 4–14 in WCC play to finish in last place. They advanced to the quarterfinals of the WCC tournament where they lost to BYU.

At the end of the season, head coach Max Good was fired. On March 12, former Charlotte Bobcats head coach Mike Dunlap was hired as Goods replacement.

== Before the season ==
=== Departures ===
Name	Number	Pos.	Height	Weight	Year	Hometown	Notes
Taylor Martin	0	G	6'1"	180	RS Senior	Inglewood, CA	Graduated
Bruce English	1	G	6'1"	190	Sophomore	La Verne, CA	Transferred
Ashley Hamilton	5	F	6'7"	210	RS Senior	London, England	Graduated
Taj Adams	10	F	6'7"	180	Freshman	Los Angeles, CA	Dismissed from the program

== Roster ==
2013–14 Loyola Marymount Lions men's basketball team
Players
Coaches

Pos.	#	Name	Height	Weight	Year	Previous school	Hometown
G	0	Alozie Eroundu (W)	6 ft 3 in (1.91 m)	200 lb (91 kg)	Jr	Groton School	Simi Valley, CA
G	1	Evan Payne	6 ft 2 in (1.88 m)	180 lb (82 kg)	Fr	Kingdom Christian Academy	Cuyahoga Falls, OH
F	2	C. J. Blackwell	6 ft 5 in (1.96 m)	240 lb (109 kg)	RS So	Taft	Los Angeles, CA
G	3	Anthony Ireland	5 ft 10 in (1.78 m)	170 lb (77 kg)	Sr	Winchedon School	Waterbury, CT
G	4	Nino Jackson	6 ft 2 in (1.88 m)	170 lb (77 kg)	RS Fr	Kingdom Christian Academy	Ardmore, OK
F	10	Ben Dickinson	6 ft 9 in (2.06 m)	223 lb (101 kg)	RS So	Gonzaga; Binghamton	Alexandria, VA
F	11	Nick Stover	6 ft 6 in (1.98 m)	200 lb (91 kg)	So	Windward	Los Angeles, CA
G	12	Blair Mendy (W) (redshirt)	6 ft 3 in (1.91 m)	170 lb (77 kg)	Fr	Bellarmine Prep	San Jose, CA
F	14	Patson Siame	6 ft 10 in (2.08 m)	250 lb (113 kg)	Fr	Findlay College Prep	Zambia, Africa
F	15	Alex Osborne	6 ft 7 in (2.01 m)	240 lb (109 kg)	RS Sr	Pacific Hills	Los Angeles, CA
G	20	Jarrett Ellis (W)	6 ft 2 in (1.88 m)	150 lb (68 kg)	Fr	East Valley	Redlands, CA
G	21	Max Heller (W)	5 ft 9 in (1.75 m)	170 lb (77 kg)	RS So	Torrey Pines; Arizona State	San Diego, CA
F	22	Godwin Okonji (injured)	6 ft 8 in (2.03 m)	220 lb (100 kg)	Sr	Findlay College Prep	Legos, Nigeria
G	23	Chase Flint	6 ft 1 in (1.85 m)	180 lb (82 kg)	Jr	Eastern Utah	Kaysville, UT
G	24	Ayodeji Egbeyemi (injured)	6 ft 4 in (1.93 m)	205 lb (93 kg)	Sr	National Christian Academy	Fort Washington, MD
F	32	Gabe Levin	6 ft 7 in (2.01 m)	230 lb (104 kg)	Fr	St. Thomas More (CT)	Oak Park, IL
F	42	Marin Mornar	6 ft 9 in (2.06 m)	190 lb (86 kg)	So	Consortium College Prep (Detroit)	Zagreb, Croatia

Head coach

- Max Good (Eastern Kentucky)

Assistant coach(es)

- Myke School (Maryland)
- Tom Abatemarco (Dowling)
- Senque Carey (New Mexico State)

Legend

- (C) Team captain
- (S) Suspended
- (I) Ineligible
- (W) Walk-on
- Injured
- Current redshirt

== Schedule and results ==
Date time, TV	Opponent	Result	Record	Site city, state
Exhibition
11/02/2013*; 7:30 pm, LMUSN	Cal Lutheran	W 96–74	-	Gersten Pavilion; Los Angeles, CA
Regular season
11/08/2013*; 4:30 pm, Cox7	vs. Grand Canyon; USD Tournament	W 78–75	1–0	Jenny Craig Pavilion; San Diego, CA
11/09/2013*; 3:30 pm	vs. South Dakota State; USD Tournament	W 98–89	2–0	Jenny Craig Pavilion; San Diego, CA
11/14/2013*; 7:00 pm, BigWest.tv	at Long Beach State	W 74–73	3–0	Walter Pyramid; Long Beach, CA
11/17/2013*; 4:00 pm, LMUSN	Northern Arizona	W 90–78	4–0	Gersten Pavilion; Los Angeles, CA
11/22/2013*; 10:30 am, TGVN.tv	vs. Northern Iowa; Paradise Jam tournament	L 81–90	4–1	Sports and Fitness Center; Saint Thomas, U.S. Virgin Islands
11/23/2013*; 11:30 am, TGVN.tv	vs. Marist; Paradise Jam Tournament	W 76–70	5–1	Sports and Fitness Center; Saint Thomas, U.S. Virgin Islands
11/25/2013*; 2:00 pm, TGVN.tv	vs. Vanderbilt; Paradise Jam Tournament 5th Place Game	L 68–77	5–2	Sports and Fitness Center; Saint Thomas, U.S. Virgin Islands
12/02/2013*; 7:00 pm, BigWest.tv	at UC Riverside	W 73–69	6–2	UC Riverside Student Recreation Center; Riverside, CA
12/06/2013*; 4:00 pm, ESPN3	at Pitt	L 68–85	6–3	Petersen Events Center; Pittsburgh, PA
12/14/2013*; 11:05 am, HLN	at Valparaiso	L 73–80	6–4	Athletics–Recreation Center; Valparaiso, IN
12/17/2013*; 7:00 pm, LMUSN	Cal Poly	W 79–59	7–4	Gersten Pavilion; Los Angeles, CA
12/21/2013*; 6:00 pm, LMUSN	La Sierra	W 100–83	8–4	Gersten Pavilion; Los Angeles, CA
12/28/2013; 1:00 pm, TWCSN/CSN CA	BYU	W 87–76	9–4 (1–0)	Gersten Pavilion; Los Angeles, CA
12/30/2013; 7:00 pm, LMUSN	San Diego	W 65–62	10–4 (2–0)	Gersten Pavilion; Los Angeles, CA
01/02/2014; 7:00 pm, TheW.tv	at San Francisco	W 75–61	10–5 (2–1)	War Memorial Gymnasium; San Francisco, CA
01/04/2014; 3:00 pm, TWCSN/CSN BAY	at Santa Clara	L 81–86 ^{OT}	10–6 (2–2)	Leavey Center; Santa Clara, CA
01/09/2014; 7:00 pm, TWCSN/CSNCA+	at San Diego	L 67–74	10–7 (2–3)	Jenny Craig Pavilion; San Diego, CA
01/11/2014; 6:00 pm, BYUtv	at BYU	L 68–91	10–8 (2–4)	Marriott Center; Provo, UT
01/16/2014; 7:00 pm, TheW.tv	Portland	L 57–71	10–9 (2–5)	Gersten Pavilion; Los Angeles, CA
01/18/2014; 1:00 pm, TWCSN/CSN BAY	Gonzaga	L 72–82	10–10 (2–6)	Gersten Pavilion; Los Angeles, CA
01/23/2014; 7:00 pm, TheW.tv	at Pacific	W 92–81	11–10 (3–6)	Alex G. Spanos Center; Stockton, CA
01/25/2014; 3:00 pm, TWCSN/CSN BAY	at Saint Mary's	L 61–89	11–11 (3–7)	McKeon Pavilion; Moraga, CA
02/01/2014; 3:00 pm, TWCSN/CSNCA	at Pepperdine	L 69–80	11–12 (3–8)	Firestone Fieldhouse; Malibu, CA
02/06/2014; 8:00 pm, TWCSN/CSNCA	Saint Mary's	L 58–77	11–13 (3–9)	Gersten Pavilion; Los Angeles, CA
02/08/2014; 4:00 pm, TheW.tv	Pacific	L 72-82	11–14 (3–10)	Gersten Pavilion; Los Angeles, CA
02/13/2014; 7:00 pm, TheW.tv	at Portland	L 64-71	11–15 (3–11)	Chiles Center; Portland, OR
02/15/2014; 5:00 pm, TheW.tv	at Gonzaga	L 67-86	11–16 (3–12)	McCarthey Athletic Center; Spokane, WA
02/20/2014; 8:00 pm, ESPNU	Pepperdine	L 69-72	11–17 (3–13)	Gersten Pavilion; Los Angeles, CA
02/27/2014; 8:00 pm, TWCSN/CSN BAY	Santa Clara	W 75-71	12–17 (4–13)	Gersten Pavilion; Los Angeles, CA
03/01/2014; 7:00 pm, TheW.tv	San Francisco	L 61–65	12–18 (4–14)	Gersten Pavilion; Los Angeles, CA
2014 West Coast tournament
03/06/2014; 6:00 pm, BYUtv	vs. Portland; First round	W 67–64	13–18	Orleans Arena; Paradise, NV
03/08/2014; 2:30 pm, BYUtv	vs. BYU; Quarterfinals	L 74–85	13–19	Orleans Arena; Paradise, NV
*Non-conference game. ^{#}Rankings from AP Poll. (#) Tournament seedings in parentheses.

== Game summaries ==
=== Exhibition: Cal Lutheran ===
Nov 2
7:35 PM PDT

Cal Lutheran Kingsmen 64, Loyola Marymount Lions 96
Scoring by half: 29-42, 35-54
Pts: Arik Smith 16; Rebs: Coltrane Powdrill 5 Asts: Arik Smith & Steven Davis 4	Pts: Anthony Ireland 24; Rebs: Ayodeji Egbeyemi & Gabe Levin 8 Asts: Anthony Ireland 7

Gersten Pavilion
Los Angeles, CA
Attendance: 1,861
Referees: Michael Greenstein, LaDonte King, Matthew Rukian

=== Vs. Grand Canyon ===
Series History: First Meeting
Broadcasters: Matt Rosen, Rex Chapman & Barry Buetel

Cox7

Nov 8
4:37 PM PST

Recap

Grand Canyon Antelopes 75, Loyola Marymount Lions 78
Scoring by half: 29-41, 46-37
Pts: Killian Larson 18; Rebs: Killian Larson 9 Asts: Jerome Garrison 3	Pts: Anthony Ireland 14; Rebs: Gabe Levin 9 Asts: Anthony Ireland 3

Jenny Craig Pavilion
San Diego, CA
Attendance: N/A
Referees: Scott Harris, Ronald Brokenbrough, Juan Corral

=== South Dakota State ===
Series History: First Meeting

Nov 9
3:35 PM PST

Recap

South Dakota State Jackrabbits 89, Loyola Marymount Lions 98
Scoring by half: 44-45, 45-53
Pts: Jordan Dykstra 22; Rebs: Jordan Dykstra 11; Asts: Chad White 3	Pts: Ben Dickinson 22; Rebs: Anthony Ireland, Ben Dickinson, & Gabe Levin 6 Asts: Anthony Ireland 12

Jenny Craig Pavilion
San Diego, CA
Attendance: 2,409
Referees: Tommy Nunez, Klaus Endrissat, Michael Rapp

=== Long Beach State ===
Series History: Long Beach State leads series 19-7

BigWest.tv

Nov 14
PST

Recap

Loyola Marymount Lions 74, Long Beach State 49ers 73
Scoring by half: 35-35, 39-38
Pts: Evan Payne 18; Rebs: Ben Dickinson 8 Asts: Anthony Ireland & Chase Flint 3	Pts: Mike Caffey 23; Rebs: Dan Jennings 11; Asts: Mike Caffey 7

Walter Pyramid
Long Beach, CA
Attendance: 3,250
Referees: Michael Scyphers, Deron White, Michael Reed

=== Northern Arizona ===
Series History: Loyola Marymount leads 7-2

Nov 17
4:05 PM PST

Recap

Northern Arizona Lumberjacks 78, Loyola Marymount Lions 90
Scoring by half: 35-36, 43-54
Pts: Max Jacobsen 28; Rebs: Gaellan Bewernick 9 Asts: Aasem Dixon 6	Pts: Anthony Ireland 18; Rebs: Gabe Levin 10; Asts: Anthony Ireland 10

Gersten Pavilion
Los Angeles, CA
Attendance: 2,119
Referees: Michael Greenstein, Michael Irving, Tommy Nunez

=== Paradise Jam: Northern Iowa ===
Series History: First Meeting

TGVN.tv

Nov 22
2:30 PM AST

Recap

Northern Iowa Panthers 90, Loyola Marymount Lions 81
Scoring by half: 53-36, 37-45
Pts: Deon Mitchell 23; Rebs: Seth Tuttle 11; Asts: Deon Mitchell & Wes Washpun 5	Pts: Anthony Ireland 24; Rebs: Gabe Levin 14; Asts: Anthony Ireland, Chase Flint & Gabe Levin 2

Sports and Fitness Center
Saint Thomas, U.S. Virgin Islands
Attendance: N/A
Referees: Sean Hull, Keith Fogelman, Lou Andrakakos

=== Paradise Jam: Marist ===
Series History: Loyola Marymount leads 2-0

TGVN.tv

Nov 23
4:05 PM AST

Recap

Loyola Marymount Lions 76, Marist Red Fixes 70
Scoring by half: 32-33, 44-37
Pts: Anthony Ireland 25; Rebs: Gabe Levin 9 Asts: Anthony Ireland 6	Pts: Chavaughn Lewis 19; Rebs: Jay Bowie & Pieter Prinsloo 7 Asts: Khallid Hart & Jay Bowie 3

Sports and Fitness Center
Saint Thomas, U.S. Virgin Islands
Attendance: N/A
Referees: Dennis Alocco, Guy Pagano, Clarence Armstrong

=== Paradise Jam: Vanderbilt ===
Series History: First Meeting

TGVN.tv

Nov 25
6:00 PM AST

Recap

Vanderbilt Commodores 77, Loyola Marymount Lions 68
Scoring by half: 30-34, 38-43
Pts: Kyle Fuller 20; Rebs: Rod Odom 8 Asts: Eric McClellan & Kyler Fuller 4	Pts: Anthony Ireland 20; Rebs: Gabe Levin 5 Asts: Evan Payne, Anthony Ireland, & Nino Jackson 2

Sports and Fitness Center
Saint Thomas, U.S. Virgin Islands
Attendance: 1,222
Referees: Dennis Allocco, Tim Ebersole, & Jacyn Goble

=== UC Riverside ===
Series History: UC Riverside leads 4-2

BigWest.tv

Dec 2
7:00 PM PST

Recap

Loyola Marymount Lions 73, UC Riverside Highlanders 69
Scoring by half: 39-31, 34-38
Pts: Anthony Ireland 16; Rebs: Gabe Levin 14; Asts: Anthony Ireland 3	Pts: Taylor Johns 22; Rebs: Taylor Johns 16; Asts: Nick Gruninger 5

UC Riverside Student Recreation Center
Riverside, CA
Attendance: 370
Referees: Michael Scyphers, Chris Rastatter, Michael Reed

=== Pittsburgh ===
Series History: Loyola Marymount leads 1-0
Broadcasters: Tim Neverett and Curtis Aiken

ESPN3

Dec 6
7:00 PM EST

Recap

Loyola Marymount Lions 68, Pitt Panthers 85
Scoring by half: 29-40, 39-45
Pts: Anthony Ireland 20; Rebs: Gabe Levin 14; Asts: Anthony Ireland 5	Pts: Cameron Wright 14; Rebs: Michael Young & Jamel Artis 7 Asts: Josh Newkirk 7

Petersen Events Center
Pittsburgh, PA
Attendance: 8,049
Referees: Bryan Kersey, Ray Natili, Brian O'Connell

=== Valparasio ===
Series History: Loyola Marymount leads 1-0

HLN

Dec 14
1:05 PM EST

Recap

Loyola Marymount Lions 73, Valparasio Crusaders 80
Scoring by half: 39-29, 34-51
Pts: Anthony Ireland 18; Rebs: Alex Osborne 6 Asts: Anthony Ireland 8	Pts: Alec Peters 30; Rebs: Alec Peters & Moussa Gueye 8 Asts: LaVonte Dority & Clay Yeo 3

Athletics–Recreation Center
Valparasio, IN
Attendance: 2,548
Referees: Rob Rorke, Horace Shields, Klaus Endrissat

=== Cal Poly ===
Series History: Loyola Marymount leads 5-4

LMUSN

Dec 17
7:05 PM PST

Recap

Cal Poly Mustangs 59, Loyola Marymount Lions 79
Scoring by half: 31-33, 28-46
Pts: Chris Eversley 21; Rebs: Chris Eversley 7 Asts: Chris Eversley, Kyle Odister, & Ridge Shipley 2	Pts: Anthony Ireland 20; Rebs: CJ Blackwell 8 Asts: Evan Payne 6

Gersten Pavilion
Los Angeles, CA
Attendance: 1,679
Referees: Mike Scyphers, Bill Reed, Bill Vonovich

=== La Sierra ===
Series History: Loyola Marymount leads 2-0

LMUSN

Dec 21
6:05 PM PST

Recap

La Sierra Golden Eagles 83, Loyola Marymount Lions 100
Scoring by half: 37-54, 46-46
Pts: Wolfgang Wood 24; Rebs: Wolfgang Wood 7 Asts: Daveon Woods 7	Pts: Evan Payne 24; Rebs: Alex Osborne 17; Asts: Chase Flint 8

Gersten Pavilion
Los Angeles, CA
Attendance: 1,412
Referees: Scott Harris, Tim Marion, Jeff Wooten

=== BYU ===
Series History: BYU leads 4-3
Broadcasters: Barry Tompkins and Jarron Collins

TWCSN

Dec 28
1:00 PM PST

BYU Cougars 76, Loyola Marymount Lions 87
Scoring by half: 33-48, 43-39
Pts: Kyle Collinsworth 18; Rebs: Kyle Collinsworth 8 Asts: Frank Bartley IV 4	Pts: Evan Payne 27; Rebs: Alex Osborne 8 Asts: Anthony Ireland 9

Gersten Pavilion
Los Angeles, CA
Attendance: 2,908
Referees: Michael Irving, Rob Rorke, Daryl Gelinas

=== San Diego ===
Series History: Series tied 43-43

LMUSN

Dec 30
7:00 PM PST

Recap

San Diego Toreros 62, Loyola Marymount Lions 65
Scoring by half: 32-28, 30-37
Pts: Johnny Dee 28; Rebs: Duda Sanadze 9 Asts: Christopher Anderson 12	Pts: Evan Payne 16; Rebs: Gabe Levin 8 Asts: Anthony Ireland 8

Gersten Pavilion
Los Angeles, CA
Attendance: 1,810
Referees: Tommy Nunez, Frank Harvey, Brett Nansel

=== San Francisco ===
Series History: San Francisco leads 107-39
Broadcasters: Pat Olson and Jim Brovelli

TheW.tv

Jan 2
7:00 PM PST

Recap

Loyola Marymount Lions 61, San Francisco Dons 75
Scoring by half: 23-40, 38-35
Pts: Anthony Ireland 18; Rebs: Gabe Levin & Chase Flint 5 Asts: Anthony Ireland 2	Pts: Cole Dickerson 20; Rebs: Matt Glover 11; Asts: Avry Holmes, Kruize Pinkins, Mark Tollefsen, Matt Christiansen, & Adams Chris 2

War Memorial Gymnasium
San Francisco, CA
Attendance: 1,448
Referees: Ken Ditty, Deldre Carr, Glen Mayberry

=== Santa Clara ===
Series History: Santa Clara leads 83-57
Broadcasters: Glen Kuiper and Dan Belluomini

TWCSN

Jan 4
3:00 PM PST

Recap

Loyola Marymount Lions 81, Santa Clara Broncos 86 (OT)
Scoring by half: 35-35, 35-35 Overtime: 11-16
Pts: Anthony Ireland 34; Rebs: Alex Osborne 10; Asts: Anthony Ireland 7	Pts: Jared Brownridge 29; Rebs: John McArthur 8 Asts: Evan Roquemore 5

Leavey Center
Santa Clara, CA
Attendance: 1,746
Referees: Michael Schyphers, Deron White, Horace Shields

=== San Diego ===
Series History: Loyola Marymount 34-33
Broadcasters: Ari Wolfe and Jon Crispin

TWCSN

Jan 9
7:00 PM PST

Recap

Loyola Marymount Lions 67, San Diego Toreros 74
Scoring by half: 28-25, 39-49
Pts: Anthony Ireland 18; Rebs: Anthony Ireland 5 Asts: Anthony Ireland 3	Pts: Duda Sanadze 22; Rebs: Duda Sanadze, Thomas Jacobs, & Simi Fajemisin 5 Asts: Christopher Anderson & Thomas Jacobs 2

Jenny Craig Pavilion
San Diego, CA
Attendance: 2,605
Referees: Kevin Brille, Gregory Nixon, Scott Harris

=== BYU ===
Series History: Series Even 4-4
Broadcasters: Dave McCann, David Nixon, and Spencer Linton

BYUtv

Jan 11
7:05 PM MST

Recap

Loyola Marymount Lions 68, BYU Cougars 91
Scoring by half: 38-37, 30-54
Pts: Anthony Ireland 17; Rebs: Alex Osborne 8 Asts: Anthony Ireland 6	Pts: Tyler Haws 31; Rebs: Kyle Collinsworth & Nate Austin 9 Asts: Kyle Collinsworth 5

Marriott Center
Provo, UT
Attendance: 15,187
Referees: Glen Mayberry, Dennis Flannery, Jeff Ketchu

=== Portland ===
Series History: Loyola Marymount 47-42
Broadcasters: Justin Alderson and Kris Johnson

TheW.tv

Jan 16
7:00 PM PST

Recap

Portland Pilots 71, Loyola Marymount Lions 57
Scoring by half: 36-29, 35-28
Pts: Bobby Sharp 14; Rebs: Ryan Nicholas 10; Asts: Korey Thieleke 3	Pts: Evan Payne 14; Rebs: Alex Osborne 10; Asts: Anthony Ireland 4

Gersten Pavilion
Los Angeles, CA
Attendance: 1,822
Referees: Frank Harvey, Daryl Gelinas, Kurt Walker

=== Gonzaga ===
Series History: Gonzaga leads 58-23
Broadcasters: Steve Quis and Kris Johnson

TWCSN

Jan 18
1:00 PM PST

Recap

Gonzaga Bulldogs 82, Loyola Marymount Lions 72
Scoring by half: 42-33, 40-39
Pts: Sam Dower 28; Rebs: Sam Dower 14; Asts: Kevin Pangos 6	Pts: Evan Payne 19; Rebs: Alex Osborne 11; Asts: Anthony Ireland 9

Gersten Pavilion
Los Angeles, CA
Attendance: 4,059
Referees: Ken Ditty, Marc Beasley, Mark Cook

=== Pacific ===
Series History: Series even 24-24
Broadcasters: Zach Bayrouty and Tod Bannister

TheW.tv

Jan 23
7:00 PM PST

Recap

Loyola Marymount Lions 92, Pacific Tigers 81
Scoring by half: 32-32, 60-49
Pts: Evan Payne 25; Rebs: Gabe Levin 10; Asts: Anthony Ireland 8	Pts: Ross Rivera 16; Rebs: Khalil Kelley 10; Asts: Andrew Bock 5

Alex G. Spanos Center
Stockton, CA
Attendance: 1,924
Referees: Tony Padilla, Glen Mayberry, Richard Batsell

=== Saint Mary's ===
Series History: Saint Mary's leads 81-54
Broadcasters: Roxy Bernstein and Stan Morrison

TWCSN

Jan 25
3:00 PM PST

Recap

Loyola Marymount Lions 61, Saint Mary's Gaels 89
Scoring by half: 24-42, 37-47
Pts: Anthony Ireland & Gabe Levin 17; Rebs: Evan Payne 7 Asts: Anthony Ireland 5	Pts: Brad Waldow 27; Rebs: Brad Waldow 10; Asts: Stephen Holt 7

McKeon Pavilion
Moraga, CA
Attendance: 3,500
Referees: Tommy Nunez, Dennis Flannery, Tom Spitznagel

=== Pepperdine ===
Series History: Pepperdine leads 93-65
Broadcasters: Chris McGee, Dave Miller and Kelli Tennant

TWCSN

Feb 1
3:04 PM PST

Recap

Loyola Marymount Lions 69, Pepperdine Waves 80
Scoring by half: 39-42, 30-38
Pts: Anthony Ireland 24; Rebs: Gabe Levin 8 Asts: Anthony Ireland 4	Pts: Malcolm Brooks 16; Rebs: Brendan Lane & Jett Raines 8 Asts: Jeremy Major 8

Firestone Fieldhouse
Malibu, CA
Attendance: 1,578
Referees: Horace Shields, LaDonte King, Michael Rapp

=== Saint Mary's ===
Series History: Saint Mary's leads 82-54
Broadcasters: Ari Wolfe, Jarron Collins, and Kelli Tennant

TWCSN

Feb 6
8:00 PM PST

Recap

Saint Mary's Gaels 77, Loyola Marymount Lions 58
Scoring by half: 37-31, 40-27
Pts: Kerry Carter 20; Rebs: Beau Levesque 14; Asts: Beau Levesque 5	Pts: Evan Payne 17; Rebs: Gabe Levin 9 Asts: Evan Payne 6

Gersten Pavilion
Los Angeles, CA
Attendance: 1,731
Referees: Ken Ditty, Deron White, Kurt Walker

=== Pacific ===
Series History: Loyola Marymount leads 25-24
Broadcasters: Justin Alderson and Kris Johnson

TheW.tv

Feb 8
4:05 PM PST

Recap

Pacific Tigers 82, Loyola Marymount Lions 72
Scoring by half: 32-23, 50-49
Pts: TJ Wallace 22; Rebs: Khalil Kelley 10; Asts: Andrew Bock & Tony Gill 5	Pts: Evan Payne 18; Rebs: Gabe Levin 6 Asts: Anthony Ireland & Nick Stover 4

Gersten Pavilion
Los Angeles, CA
Attendance: 3,062
Referees: Bruce Hicks, Dennis Flannery, Scott Harris

=== Portland ===
Series History: Loyola Marymount 47-43
Broadcasters: Ray Crawford and Jordan Cornette

TheW.tv

Feb 13
7:00 PM PST

Recap

Loyola Marymount Lions 64, Portland Pilots 71
Scoring by half: 36-29, 28-42
Pts: Evan Payne 21; Rebs: Alex Osborne 7 Asts: Anthony Ireland 6	Pts: Ryan Nicholas 16; Rebs: Thomas Van Der Mars 10; Asts: Alec Wintering 10

Chiles Center
Portland, OR
Attendance: 2,035
Referees: Brett Nansel, Jeffrey Kent, Jeff Wooten

=== Gonzaga ===
Series History: Gonzaga leads 59-23
Broadcasters: Greg Heister, Richard Fox, and Dan Dickau

TheW.tv

Feb 15
5:00 PM PST

Recap

Loyola Marymount Lions 67, Gonzaga Bulldogs 86
Scoring by half: 31-45, 36-41
Pts: Anthony Ireland 23; Rebs: Nick Stover 6 Asts: Anthony Ireland 5	Pts: Sam Dower Jr. 25; Rebs: Sam Dower Jr. 15; Asts: David Stockton 5

McCarthey Athletic Center
Spokane, WA
Attendance: 6,000
Referees: Jimmy Casas, Coban Lopez, Courtney Holmes

=== Pepperdine ===
Series History: Pepperdine leads 94-65
Broadcasters: Roxy Bernstein and Corey Williams

ESPNU

Feb 20
8:00 PM PST

Recap

Pepperdine Waves 72, Loyola Marymount Lions 69
Scoring by half: 35-31, 37-38
Pts: Stacy Davis 27; Rebs: Stacy Davis 12; Asts: Jeremy Major 8	Pts: Anthony Ireland 26; Rebs: Alex Osborne 9 Asts: Anthony Ireland 4

Gersten Pavilion
Los Angeles, CA
Attendance: 2,287
Referees: Glen Mayberry, Deldre Carr, Tom Spitznagel

=== Santa Clara ===
Series History: Santa Clara leads 83-57
Broadcasters: Ari Wolfe and Jarron Collins

TWCSN

Feb 27
8:00 PM PST

Recap

Santa Clara Broncos 71, Loyola Marymount Lions 75
Scoring by half: 34-30, 37-45
Pts: Evan Roquemore 19; Rebs: Yannick Atanga 7 Asts: Evan Roquemore 5	Pts: Evan Payne 27; Rebs: Alex Osborne 11; Asts: Anthony Ireland 4

Gersten Pavilion
Los Angeles, CA
Attendance: 2,011
Referees: Frank Harvey, Gregory Nixon, Ronald Brokenbrough

=== San Francisco ===
Series History: San Francisco leads 108-39
Broadcasters: Justin Alderson and Kris Johnson

TheW.tv

Mar 1
7:00 PM PST

San Francisco Dons 65, Loyola Marymount Lions 61
Scoring by half: 35-27, 30-34
Pts: Avry Holmes 25; Rebs: Matt Glover 11; Asts: Matt Glover 5	Pts: Evan Payne, CJ Blackwell, & Anthony Ireland 13; Rebs: Alex Osborne 10; Asts: Anthony Ireland 6

Gersten Pavilion
Los Angeles, CA
Attendance: 2,038
Referees: Marc Beasley, Jimmy Casas, Rob Rorke

=== WCC Tournament: Portland ===
Series History: Loyola Marymount 47-44
Broadcasters: Dave McCann, Blaine Fowler, and Spencer Linton

BYUtv

Mar 6
PST

Loyola Marymount Lions vs. Portland Pilots

Orleans Arena
Paradise, NV
