= 2013–14 BYU Cougars men's basketball team =

American college basketball season

2013–14 BYU Cougars men's basketball

NCAA tournament, round of 64
- Conference: West Coast Conference
- Record: 23–12 (13–5 WCC)
- Head coach: Dave Rose (9th season)
- Assistant coaches: Terry Nashif (7th season); Tim LaComb (4th season); Mark Pope (3rd season)
- Home arena: Marriott Center

2013–14 West Coast Conference men's basketball standings
	Conf.				Overall
Team	W		L	PCT	W		L	PCT
Gonzaga †	15	–	3	.833	29	–	7	.806
BYU	13	–	5	.722	23	–	12	.657
San Francisco	13	–	5	.722	21	–	12	.636
Saint Mary's	11	–	7	.611	23	–	12	.657
Pepperdine	8	–	10	.444	15	–	16	.484
San Diego	7	–	11	.389	18	–	17	.514
Portland	7	–	11	.389	15	–	16	.484
Pacific	6	–	12	.333	18	–	16	.529
Santa Clara	6	–	12	.333	14	–	19	.424
Loyola Marymount	4	–	14	.222	13	–	19	.406
† Conference tournament winner

The 2013–14 BYU Cougars men's basketball team represented Brigham Young University in the 2013–14 NCAA Division I men's basketball season. This was head coach Dave Rose's ninth season at BYU and the Cougars third season in the West Coast Conference. The Cougars played their home games at the Marriott Center. They finished the season 23–12, 13–5 in WCC play to finish in a tie for second place. They advanced to the championship game of the WCC tournament where they lost to Gonzaga. They received an at large bid to the NCAA tournament where they lost in the second round to Oregon.

== Before the season ==
=== Departures ===
Name	Number	Pos.	Height	Weight	Year	Hometown	Notes
Brandon Davies	0	F	6'9"	235	Senior	Provo, Utah	Graduated
Raúl Delgado	1	G	6'2"	195	Junior	Chihuahua, Mexico	Transferred to Division II Metro State
Craig Cusick	2	G	6'2"	185	RS Senior	Orem, Utah	Graduated
Brock Zylstra	13	G/F	6'6"	210	Senior	La Verne, California	Graduated
Agustin Ambrosino	15	F	6'2"	195	Junior	Córdoba, Argentina	Left BYU
Cory Calvert	23	G	6'3"	175	Freshman	Parker, Colorado	LDS mission (returning in 2015-16)
Cooper Ainge	30	G	6'0"	175	Freshman	Wellesley, Massachusetts	LDS mission (returning in 2015-16)
Ian Harward	42	F/C	6'10"	215	RS Freshman	Orem, Utah	Retired due to medical injury

=== Recruiting ===
As early recruiting began, BYU had 5 players commit to play. Three of the players- Nick Emery, Jakob Hartsock, and Braiden Shaw, plan to serve two-year church missions before joining the team for the 2015-16 season. The other two plan to join BYU and play during the 2013-14 season. During late recruitment, the Cougars had one JC Player decide to transfer to BYU in Skyler Halford.

College recruiting (2013)
Name	Hometown	School	Height	Weight	Commit date
Nick Emery; G	Alpine, Utah	Lone Peak	6 ft 2 in (1.88 m)	180 lb (82 kg)	Aug 30, 2011
Nick Emery; G	Recruit ratings: Scout: Rivals: (86)				
Jakob Hartsock; F	Bartlesville, Oklahoma	Bartlesville	6 ft 7 in (2.01 m)	205 lb (93 kg)	Feb 26, 2012
Jakob Hartsock; F	Recruit ratings: Scout: Rivals: (72)				
Eric Mika; F	Alpine, Utah	Lone Peak	6 ft 9 in (2.06 m)	220 lb (100 kg)	Dec 17, 2011
Eric Mika; F	Recruit ratings: Scout: Rivals: (84)				
Braiden Shaw; F	Eagle, Idaho	Eagle	6 ft 8 in (2.03 m)	210 lb (95 kg)	Oct 9, 2011
Braiden Shaw; F	Recruit ratings: Scout: Rivals: (70)				
Luke Worthington; F	Mequon, Wisconsin	Homestead	6 ft 9 in (2.06 m)	240 lb (110 kg)	Sep 3, 2012
Luke Worthington; F	Recruit ratings: Scout: Rivals: (74)				
Frank Bartley; G	Louisiana	California Prep	6 ft 3 in (1.91 m)	205 lb (93 kg)	May 13, 2013
Frank Bartley; G	Recruit ratings: Scout: Rivals: (NR)				
Skyler Halford; G	Orem, Utah	Timpanogos; Salt Lake CC	6 ft 1 in (1.85 m)	180 lb (82 kg)	Mar 5, 2013
Skyler Halford; G	Recruit ratings: Scout: Rivals: (JC)				
Overall recruit ranking: Scout: 22 Rivals: 17 ESPN: 16
Note: In many cases, Scout, Rivals, 247Sports, On3, and ESPN may conflict in their listings of height and weight.; In these cases, the average was taken. ESPN grades are on a 100-point scale.; Sources: "BYU 2013 Basketball Commitments". Rivals.; "2013 BYU Basketball Commits". Scout.; "ESPN". ESPN.; "Scout.com Team Recruiting Rankings". Scout.; "2013 Team Ranking". Rivals.

=== 2013–14 return missionaries ===
For the 2013-14 season, Coach Rose announced that Kyle Collinsworth would return from his mission in the summer of 2013 and resume playing as a forward for the BYU team. Collinsworth had been serving as a two-year church missionary in Russia.

College recruiting (2010)
Name	Hometown	School	Height	Weight	Commit date
Kyle Collinsworth; F	Mapleton, Utah	Provo	6 ft 6 in (1.98 m)	195 lb (88 kg)	Oct 7, 2009
Kyle Collinsworth; F	Recruit ratings: Scout: Rivals: (88)				
Overall recruit ranking: Scout: nr Rivals: nr ESPN: nr
Note: In many cases, Scout, Rivals, 247Sports, On3, and ESPN may conflict in their listings of height and weight.; In these cases, the average was taken. ESPN grades are on a 100-point scale.; Sources: "BYU 2010 Basketball Commitments". Rivals.; "2010 BYU Basketball Commits". Scout.; "ESPN". ESPN.; "Scout.com Team Recruiting Rankings". Scout.; "2010 Team Ranking". Rivals.

=== Coaching ===
BYU also unveiled a surprise face as a new member of the coaching staff. Noah Hartsock returned from Spain to pursue his graduate degree and was named as a Student Assistant.

== 2013–14 media ==
=== Nu Skin Cougar IMG Sports Network ===
KSL 102.7 FM and 1160 AM- Flagship Station (Salt Lake City/ Provo, UT and ksl.com)
BYU Radio- Nationwide (Dish Network 980, Sirius XM 143, and byuradio.org)
KTHK- Blackfoot/ Idaho Falls/ Pocatello/ Rexburg, ID
KMGR- Manti, UT
KSUB- Cedar City, UT
KDXU- St. George, UT

== Roster ==
2013–14 BYU Cougars men's basketball team
Players
Coaches

Pos.	#	Name	Height	Weight	Year	Previous school	Hometown
F	0	Eric Mika	6 ft 9 in (2.06 m)	220 lb (100 kg)	Fr	Lone Peak	Alpine, UT
G	2	Matt Carlino (C)	6 ft 2 in (1.88 m)	175 lb (79 kg)	RS Jr	Bloomington South	Scottsdale, AZ
G	3	Tyler Haws (C)	6 ft 5 in (1.96 m)	200 lb (91 kg)	Jr	Lone Peak	Alpine, UT
G	5	Kyle Collinsworth (C)	6 ft 6 in (1.98 m)	210 lb (95 kg)	So	Provo	Provo, UT
F	12	Josh Sharp	6 ft 7 in (2.01 m)	185 lb (84 kg)	RS Jr	Lone Peak; Utah	Highland, UT
G	13	Andrew Johnston (W)	6 ft 3 in (1.91 m)	185 lb (84 kg)	So	Snow Canyon	St. George, UT
G	20	Anson Winder	6 ft 3 in (1.91 m)	195 lb (88 kg)	RS Jr	Bishop Gorman	Las Vegas, NV
G	23	Skyler Halford	6 ft 1 in (1.85 m)	180 lb (82 kg)	Jr	Timpanogos; Salt Lake CC	Orem, UT
G	24	Frank Bartley	6 ft 3 in (1.91 m)	200 lb (91 kg)	Fr	Future College Prep	Baton Rouge, LA
G	30	Chase Fischer (redshirt)	6 ft 3 in (1.91 m)	195 lb (88 kg)	Jr	Ripley; Wake Forest	Ripley, WV
F/C	33	Nate Austin	6 ft 11 in (2.11 m)	230 lb (104 kg)	RS Jr	Lone Peak	Alpine, UT
C	35	Isaac Neilson (redshirt)	6 ft 10 in (2.08 m)	230 lb (104 kg)	Fr	Mission Viejo	Mission Viejo, CA
F	40	Jamal Aytes (redshirt)	6 ft 6 in (1.98 m)	230 lb (104 kg)	Fr	JSerra; UNLV	San Diego, CA
F	41	Luke Worthington	6 ft 9 in (2.06 m)	240 lb (109 kg)	Fr	Homestead	Mequon, WI
F	45	Graham Pingree (W)	6 ft 8 in (2.03 m)	235 lb (107 kg)	Fr	Cherry Creek	Greenwood Village, CO

Head coach

- Dave Rose (Houston)

Assistant coach(es)

- Terry Nashif (BYU)
- Tim LaComb (Utah)
- Mark Pope (Kentucky)
- Noah Hartsock (BYU)

Legend

- (C) Team captain
- (S) Suspended
- (I) Ineligible
- (W) Walk-on
- Injured
- Current redshirt

== Schedule ==
Date time, TV	Rank^{#}	Opponent^{#}	Result	Record	Site city, state
Exhibition
10/26/2013*; 7:00 pm, BYUtv		Colorado College	W 94–59	n/a	Marriott Center; Provo, UT
11/02/2013*; 7:00 pm, BYUtv		Alaska–Anchorage	W 99–68	n/a	Marriott Center; Provo, UT
Non-conference regular season
11/09/2013*; 7:00 pm, BYUtv		Weber State; Old Oquirrh Bucket	W 81–72	1–0	Marriott Center; Provo, UT
11/11/2013*; 9:00 pm, ESPN2		at Stanford; ESPN College Hoops Tipoff Marathon	W 112–103	2–0	Maples Pavilion; Palo Alto, CA
11/15/2013*; 7:30 pm, BYUtv		Mount St. Mary's; CBE Hall of Fame Classic	W 108–76	3–0	Marriott Center; Provo, UT
11/16/2013*; 7:30 pm, BYUtv		Colorado Mesa; CBE Hall of Fame Classic	W 84–60	4–0	Marriott Center; Provo, UT
11/20/2013*; 7:30 pm, ESPNU		No. 21 Iowa State	L 88–90	4–1	Marriott Center; Provo, UT
11/25/2013*; 5:30 pm, ESPNU		vs. Texas; CBE Hall of Fame Classic	W 86–82	5–1	Sprint Center; Kansas City, MO
11/26/2013*; 8:00 pm, ESPN2		vs. No. 12 Wichita State; CBE Hall of Fame Classic Championship	L 62–75	5–2	Sprint Center; Kansas City, MO
11/30/2013*; 7:00 pm, BYUtv		vs. Utah State; Old Oquirrh Bucket	W 85–74	6–2	Energy Solutions Arena; Salt Lake City, UT
12/03/2013*; 7:00 pm, BYUtv		North Texas	W 97–67	7–2	Marriott Center; Provo, UT
12/07/2013*; 11:30 am, CBSSN		vs. No. 21 UMass; Hall of Fame Showcase	L 96–105	7–3	MassMutual Center; Springfield, MA
12/11/2013*; 7:00 pm, BYUtv		Prairie View A&M	W 100–52	8–3	Marriott Center; Provo, UT
12/14/2013*; 8:00 pm, P12N		at Utah; Old Oquirrh Bucket	L 64–81	8–4	Huntsman Center; Salt Lake City, UT
12/21/2013*; 8:30 pm, P12N		at No. 13 Oregon	L 96–100 ^{OT}	8–5	Matthew Knight Arena; Eugene, OR
WCC Regular Season
12/28/2013; 2:00 pm, ROOT UT		at Loyola Marymount	L 76–87	8–6 (0–1)	Gersten Pavilion; Los Angeles, CA
12/30/2013; 8:00 pm, TheW.tv		at Pepperdine	L 74–80	8–7 (0–2)	Firestone Fieldhouse; Malibu, CA
01/04/2014; 7:00 pm, BYUtv		San Diego	W 87–53	9–7 (1–2)	Marriott Center; Provo, UT
01/09/2014; 7:00 pm, BYUtv		Pepperdine	W 84–72	10–7 (2–2)	Marriott Center; Provo, UT
01/11/2014; 7:00 pm, BYUtv		Loyola Marymount	W 91–68	11–7 (3–2)	Marriott Center; Provo, UT
01/16/2014; 7:00 pm, ESPNU		at San Francisco	W 83–76	12–7 (4–2)	War Memorial Gymnasium; San Francisco, CA
01/18/2014; 8:00 pm, ROOT UT		at Santa Clara	W 91–81	13–7 (5–2)	Leavey Center; Santa Clara, CA
01/23/2014; 8:00 pm, ROOT UT		at Portland	L 110–114 ^{3OT}	13–8 (5–3)	Chiles Center; Portland, OR
01/25/2014; 8:00 pm, ESPN2		at Gonzaga	L 69–84	13–9 (5–4)	McCarthey Athletic Center; Spokane, WA
01/30/2014; 7:00 pm, BYUtv		Pacific	W 88–78	14–9 (6–4)	Marriott Center; Provo, UT
02/01/2014; 8:00 pm, ESPN2		Saint Mary's	W 84–71	15–9 (7–4)	Marriott Center; Provo, UT
02/06/2014; 9:00 pm, ESPNU		Santa Clara	W 89–76	16–9 (8–4)	Marriott Center; Provo, UT
02/08/2014; 7:00 pm, BYUtv		San Francisco	W 68–63	17–9 (9–4)	Marriott Center; Provo, UT
02/13/2014; 9:00 pm, ROOT UT		at Pacific	L 82–89	17–10 (9–5)	Alex G. Spanos Center; Stockton, CA
02/15/2014; 6:00 pm, ESPN2		at Saint Mary's	W 60–57	18–10 (10–5)	McKeon Pavilion; Moraga, CA
02/20/2014; 9:00 pm, ESPN2		No. 25 Gonzaga	W 73–65	19–10 (11–5)	Marriott Center; Provo, UT
02/22/2014; 7:00 pm, BYUtv		Portland	W 89–72	20–10 (12–5)	Marriott Center; Provo, UT
03/01/2014; 2:00 pm, ROOT UT		at San Diego	W 78–70	21–10 (13–5)	Jenny Craig Pavilion; San Diego, CA
2014 WCC tournament
03/08/2014; 1:00 pm, BYUtv	(2)	vs. (10) Loyola Marymount; Quarterfinals	W 85–74	22–10	Orleans Arena; Paradise, NV
03/10/2014; 9:30 pm, ESPN2	(2)	vs. (3) San Francisco; Semifinals	W 79–77 ^{OT}	23–10	Orleans Arena; Paradise, NV
03/11/2014; 7:00 pm, ESPN	(2)	vs. (1) Gonzaga; Championship	L 64–75	23–11	Orleans Arena; Paradise, NV
2014 NCAA tournament
03/20/2014; 1:10 pm, truTV	(10 W)	vs. (7 W) Oregon; Second round	L 68–87	23–12	BMO Harris Bradley Center; Milwaukee, WI
*Non-conference game. ^{#}Rankings from AP Poll / Coaches' Poll. (#) Tournament seedings in parentheses. All times are in Mountain. (#) during NCAA Tournament is seed with region W=West.

== Game summaries ==
=== Cougar Tipoff ===
Broadcasters: Spencer Linton, David Nixon, Jake Edmonds, and Justin Ashby
Stats reset at Halftime and players moved onto different squads. Also done differently was a running clock in the first half and a regular clock in the second half. The first half featured mixed squads while the second half featured regulars vs. Redshirts, Walk-ons, and Practice Squad. Jordan Ellis, Andrew Topham, Austin Winegar, & Tyler Nicholas- 4 practice squad members, participate in the second half. Nate Austin would only play 1 minute. He was pulled after his tooth got broke during the game.

Rosters:

BYU White (1st Half)- Eric Mika, Matt Carlino, Skyler Halford, Chase Fischer, Nate Austin, Josh Sharp, Andrew Johnston, Graham Pingree
BYU White (2nd Half)- Eric Mika, Matt Carlino, Tyler Haws, Kyle Collinsworth, Josh Sharp, Anson Winder, Skyler Halford, Frank Bartley IV, Luke Worthington
BYU Blue (1st Half)- Tyler Haws, Kyle Collinsworth, Anson Winder, Frank Bartley IV, Luke Worthington
BYU Blue (2nd Half)- Jordan Ellis, Andrew Johnston, Chase Fischer, Andrew Topham, Graham Pingree, Austin Winegar, Tyler Nicholas

byutvsports.com

Oct 23
7:05 PM MST

Recap

BYU Blue vs. BYU White
Scoring by half: 34-35, 39-60
Pts: Tyler Haws 14 (1st Half); Chase Fischer 11 (2nd Half); Rebs: Kyle Collinsworth & Luke Worthington 4 (1st Half); Graham Pingree 4 (2nd Half); Asts: Kyle Collinsworth 3 (1st Half); Jordan Ellis, Andrew Johnston, & Chase Fischer 3 (2nd Half)	Pts: Matt Carlino 14 (1st Half); Matt Carlino 17 (2nd Half); Rebs: Eric Mika 8 (1st Half); Kyle Collinsworth & Josh Sharp 6 (2nd Half); Asts: Matt Carlino & Chase Fischer 2 (1st Half); Kyle Collinsworth 4 (2nd Half)

Marriott Center
Provo, UT
Attendance: N/A
Referees: N/A

=== Exhibition: Colorado College ===
Broadcasters: Dave McCann, Blaine Fowler, and Lauren Francom
Series History: BYU leads regular season series history 11-5-6 with all matches having occurred between 1923 and 1936.
Starting Lineups:

- BYU: Matt Carlino, Tyler Haws, Anson Winder, Kyle Collinsworth, Eric Mika
- Colorado College: Ryan Milne, Justin Bernardino, James Lonergan, Daniel Webb, Chris Lesnansky

BYUtv

Oct 26
7:05 PM MST

Recap

Colorado College Tigers 59, BYU Cougars 94
Scoring by half: 39-49, 20-45
Pts: Ryan Milne 23; Rebs: Daniel Webb & Luke Winfield 5 Asts: Ryan Milne 5	Pts: Matt Carlino 23; Rebs: Kyle Collinsworth 11; Asts: Kyle Collinsworth 5

Marriott Center
Provo, UT
Attendance: 7,221
Referees: Richard Batsell, Jimmy Casas, Jeffrey Kent

=== Exhibition: Alaska-Anchorage ===
Broadcasters: Spencer Linton, David Nixon, and Lauren Francom
Series History: BYU leads regular season series 1-0
Starting Lineups:

- BYU: Nate Austin, Tyler Haws, Kyle Collinsworth, Frank Bartley IV, Matt Carlino
- Alaska-Anchorage: Kyle Fossman, Travis Thompson, Brian McGill, Teancum Stafford, Brad Mears

BYUtv

Nov 2
7:05 PM MST

Recap

Alaska-Anchorage Seawolves 68, BYU Cougars 99
Scoring by half: 30-44, 38-55
Pts: Travis Thompson 14; Rebs: Christian Leckband & Kyle Fossman 4 Asts: Brian McGill 5	Pts: Matt Carlino & Eric Mika 17; Rebs: Eric Mika 14; Asts: Frank Bartley IV 4

Marriott Center
Provo, UT
Attendance: 9,032
Referees: Tony Padilla, Casey McClellan, Nate Harris

=== Weber State ===
Broadcasters: Spencer Linton, David Nixon, and Lauren Francom
Series History: BYU leads series 28-10
Starting Lineups:

- BYU: Matt Carlino, Kyle Collinsworth, Tyler Haws, Nate Austin, Eric Mika
- Weber State: Jordan Richardson, Jeremy Senglin, Davion Berry, Joel Bolomboy, Kyle Tresnak

BYUtv

Nov 8
7:05 pm MST

Recap

Weber State Wildcats 72, BYU Cougars 81
Scoring by half: 33-44, 39-37
Pts: Kyle Tresnak 24; Rebs: Joel Bolomboy 13; Asts: Jordan Richardson 3	Pts: Tyler Haws 28; Rebs: Tyler Haws 13; Asts: Matt Carlino & Kyle Collinsworth 6

Marriott Center
Provo, UT
Attendance: 15,696
Referees: Mark Cook, Michael Rapp, Matt Morales

=== Stanford ===
Broadcasters: Dave Pasch and Seth Greenberg
Series History: BYU leads series 4-2
Starting Lineups:

- BYU: Matt Carlino, Kyle Collinsworth, Tyler Haws, Nate Austin, Eric Mika
- Stanford: Chasson Randle, Anthony Brown, Josh Huestis, Dwight Powell, Stefan Nastic

ESPN2

Nov 11
8:00 PM PST

Recap

BYU Cougars 112, Stanford Cardinal 103
Scoring by half: 54-46, 58-57
Pts: Tyler Haws 31; Rebs: Tyler Haws & Nate Austin 8 Asts: Kyle Collinsworth 9	Pts: Chasson Randle 33; Rebs: Josh Huestis 9 Asts: Aaron Bright & Dwight Powell 3

Maples Pavilion
Palo Alto, CA
Attendance: 5,994
Referees: Ken Ditty, David Hall, Deron White

=== CBE Classic: Mount Saint Mary's ===
Broadcasters: Dave McCann, Blaine Fowler, and Spencer Linton
Series History: First Meeting
Starting Lineups:

- BYU: Matt Carlino, Kyle Collinsworth, Anson Winder, Nate Austin, Eric Mika
- Mt. Saint Mary's: Byron Ash, Julian Norfleet, Sam Prescott, Gregory Graves, Kristijan Krajina

BYUtv

Nov 15
7:30 PM MST

Recap

Mount Saint Mary's Mountaineers 76, BYU Cougars 108
Scoring by half: 34-54, 42-54
Pts: Rashad Whack 19; Rebs: Rashad Whack 6 Asts: Khalid Nwandu & Julian Norfleet 6	Pts: Anson Winder 22; Rebs: Kyle Collinsworth 10; Asts: Matt Carlino 8

Marriott Center
Provo, UT
Attendance: 16,481
Referees: Hal Lusk, K.C. Ely, Byron Jarrett

=== CBE Classic: Colorado Mesa ===
Broadcasters: Dave McCann, Blaine Fowler, and Spencer Linton
Series History: First Metting
Starting Lineups:

- BYU: Matt Carlino, Kyle Collinsworth, Anson Winder, Nate Austin, Eric Mika
- Colorado Mesa: Landon Vermeer, Jon Orr, Clay Kame, Carlos Perez, Joe Kiely

BYUtv

Nov 16
7:30 PM MST

Recap

Colorado Mesa Mavericks 60, BYU Cougars 84
Scoring by half: 28-36, 32-48
Pts: Landon Vermeer 23; Rebs: Joe Kiely 6 Asts: Joe Kiely 7	Pts: Matt Carlino 16; Rebs: Nate Austin 12; Asts: Kyle Collinsworth 6

Marriott Center
Provo, UT
Attendance: 16,018
Referees: Terry Davis, Toby Martinez, Pat Boeh

=== #21 Iowa State ===
Broadcasters: Roxy Bernstein and Miles Simon
Series History: Iowa State leads series 5-0
Starting Lineups:

- BYU- Matt Carlino, Tyler Haws, Kyle Collinsworth, Nate Austin, Eric Mika
- Iowa State- Georges Niang, Dustin Hogue, Matt Thomas, DeAndre Kane, Naz Long

ESPNU

Nov 20
7:35 PM MST

Recap

#21 Iowa State Cyclones 90, BYU Cougars 88
Scoring by half: 42-47, 48-41
Pts: Melvin Ejim & DeAndre Kane 21; Rebs: DeAndre Kane 11; Asts: Georges Niang 8	Pts: Tyler Haws 20; Rebs: Nate Austin 13; Asts: Matt Carlino 7

Marriott Center
Provo, UT
Attendance: 15,808
Referees: Michael Reed, Gregory Nixon, Ken Ditty

=== CBE Classic: Texas ===
Broadcasters: Mark Neely and Sean Farnham
Series History: BYU leads 3-2
Starting Lineups:

- BYU- Tyler Haws, Matt Carlino, Kyle Collinsworth, Nate Austin, Eric Mika
- Texas- Isaiah Taylor, Damarcus Holland, Damarcus Croaker, Jonathan Holmes, Cameron Ridley

ESPNU

Nov 25
6:30 PM CST

Recap

BYU Cougars 86, Texas Longhorns 82
Scoring by half: 43-42, 43-40
Pts: Tyler Haws 25; Rebs: Kyle Collinsworth 8 Asts: Matt Carlino 6	Pts: Javan Felix 17; Rebs: Jonathan Holmes & Cameron Ridley 10; Asts: Isaiah Taylor, Demarcus Holland, & Javan Felix 3

Sprint Center
Kansas City, MO
Attendance: 7,682
Referees: Kelly Self, Kipp Kissinger, Terry Oglesby

=== CBE Classic: #12 Wichita State ===
Broadcasters: Mark Neely and Sean Farnham
Series History: Wichita State leads 6-1
Starting Lineups:

- BYU- Tyler Haws, Matt Carlino, Kyle Collinsworth, Nate Austin, Eric Mika
- Wichita State- Cleanthony Early, Kadeem Coleby, Fred VanVleet, Tekele Cotton, Ron Baker

ESPN2

Nov 26
9:15 PM CST

Recap

BYU Cougars 62, Wichita State Shockers 75
Scoring by half: 36-34, 26-41
Pts: Matt Carlino 21; Rebs: Nate Austin 12; Asts: Matt Carlino & Kyle Collinsworth 2	Pts: Ron Baker 23; Rebs: Ron Baker 8 Asts: Cleanthony Early, Fred VanVleet, Tekele Cotton, & Ron Baker 3

Sprint Center
Kansas City, MO
Attendance: 8,324
Referees: Duke Edsall, Rick Crawford, Ray Natili

=== Utah State ===
Broadcasters: Dave McCann, Blaine Fowler, and Lauren Francom
Series History: BYU leads series 137-92
Starting Lineups:

- BYU: Matt Carlino, Kyle Collinsworth, Tyler Haws, Nate Austin, Eric Mika
- Utah State: Jarred Shaw, Preston Medlin, Spencer Butterfield, Kyle Davis, Tenale Roland

BYUtv

Nov 30
7:05 PM MST

Recap

Utah State Aggies 74, BYU Cougars 85
Scoring by half: 44-39, 30-46
Pts: Spencer Butterfield 20; Rebs: Jarred Shaw 13; Asts: Preston Medlin 7	Pts: Tyler Haws 21; Rebs: Kyle Collinsworth 13; Asts: Kyle Collinsworth 8

Energy Solutions Arena
Salt Lake City, UT
Attendance: 18,235
Referees: Mike Reed, Mike Scyphers, Tommy Nunez

=== North Texas ===
Broadcasters: Dave McCann, Blaine Fowler, and Spencer Linton
Series History: BYU leads 2-0
Starting Lineups:

- BYU- Tyler Haws, Matt Carlino, Kyle Collinsworth, Nate Austin, Eric Mika
- North Texas- Chris Jones, Vertrail Vaughns, Alzee Williams, Colin Voss, Keith Coleman

BYUtv

Dec 3
7:05 PM MST

Recap

North Texas Mean Green 67, BYU Cougars 97
Scoring by half: 35-42, 32-55
Pts: Maurice Aniefiok 11; Rebs: Maurice Aniefiok & Keith Coleman 6 Asts: Chris Jones 6	Pts: Tyler Haws 23; Rebs: Nate Austin 13; Asts: Matt Carlino 11

Marriott Center
Provo, UT
Attendance: 13,908
Referees: Michael Greenstein, Michael Scyphers, Rob Rorke

=== #21 UMass ===
Broadcasters: John Sadak and Pete Gillen
Series History: First Meeting
Starting Lineups:

- BYU: Matt Carlino, Kyle Collinsworth, Tyler Haws, Nate Austin, Eric Mika
- UMass: Cady Lalanne, Sampson Carter, Raphiael Putney, Chaz Williams, Derrick Gordon

CBSSN

Dec 7
1:30 PM EST

Recap

BYU Cougars 96, #21 UMass Minutemen 105
Scoring by half: 41-52, 55-53
Pts: Tyler Haws 25; Rebs: Eric Mika 8 Asts: Matt Carlino 6	Pts: Chaz Williams 32; Rebs: Maxie Esho 6 Asts: Chaz Williams 15

MassMutual Center
Springfield, MA
Attendance: 7,331
Referees: Tony Crisp, Damon Williams, Ty Meixsell

=== Prairie View A&M ===
Broadcasters: Dave McCann, David Nixon, and Spencer Linton
Series History: BYU leads 1-0
Starting Lineups:

- BYU- Tyler Haws, Matt Carlino, Kyle Collinsworth, Nate Austin, Eric Mika
- Prairie View A&M- John Brisco, Trey Hagood, Montrael Scott, Hershey Robinson, Reggis Onwukamuche

BYUtv

Dec 11
7:05 PM MST

Recap

Prairie View A&M Panthers 52, BYU Cougars 100
Scoring by half: 28-46, 24-54
Pts: Hershey Robinson 12; Rebs: Tre Hagood, Hershey Robinson, Patrick Agho, & Karim York 4 Asts: Tre Hagood, Hershey Robinson, & John Brisco 2	Pts: Tyler Haws & Kyle Collinsworth 19; Rebs: Nate Austin 11; Asts: Matt Carlino 7

Marriott Center
Provo, UT
Attendance: 15,194
Referees: Gregory Nixon, Deron White, Brett Nansel

=== Utah ===
Broadcasters: Rich Cellini and Dan Dickau
Series History: BYU leads 129-125
Starting Lineups:

- BYU: Matt Carlino, Kyle Collinsworth, Tyler Haws, Nate Austin, Eric Mika
- Utah: Jordan Loveridge, Renan Lenz, Dakarai Tucker, Brandon Taylor, Delon Wright

P12N

Dec 14
8:00 PM MST

Recap

BYU Cougars 64, Utah Utes 81
Scoring by half: 29-42, 35-39
Pts: Tyler Haws 14; Rebs: Eric Mika 10; Asts: Kyle Collinsworth 4	Pts: Jordan Loveridge 21; Rebs: Dallin Bachynski 8 Asts: Delon Wright 7

Huntsman Center
Salt Lake City, UT
Attendance: 13,733
Referees: Mike Greenstein, Kevin Brill, Deldre Carr

=== #13 Oregon ===
Broadcasters: JB Long and Ernie Kent
Series History: Oregon leads 12-9
Starting Lineups:

- BYU- Tyler Haws, Matt Carlino, Kyle Collinsworth, Nate Austin, Eric Mika
- Oregon- Joseph Young, Mike Moser, Johnathan Loyd, Damyean Dotson, Waverly Austin

P12N

Dec 21
7:30 PM PST

Recap

BYU Cougars 96, #13 Oregon Ducks 100 (OT)
Scoring by half: 47-41, 37-43 Overtime: 12-16
Pts: Tyler Haws 32; Rebs: Nate Austin 12; Asts: Kyle Collinsworth 8	Pts: Jason Calliste 31; Rebs: Mike Moser 9 Asts: Johnathan Loyd 6

Matthew Knight Arena
Eugene, OR
Attendance: 8,035
Referees: Michael Irving, Frank Harvey, Glenn Mayberry

=== Loyola Marymount ===
Broadcasters: Barry Tompkins and Jarron Collins
Series History: BYU leads 4-3
Starting Lineups:

- BYU: Matt Carlino, Kyle Collinsworth, Tyler Haws, Nate Austin, Eric Mika
- LMU: Evan Payne, Anthony Ireland, CJ Blackwell, Gabe Levin, Alex Osborne

ROOT

Dec 28
1:00 PM PST

BYU Cougars 76, Loyola Marymount Lions 87
Scoring by half: 33-48, 43-39
Pts: Kyle Collinsworth 18; Rebs: Kyle Collinsworth 8 Asts: Frank Bartley IV 4	Pts: Evan Payne 27; Rebs: Alex Osborne 8 Asts: Anthony Ireland 9

Gersten Pavilion
Los Angeles, CA
Attendance: 2,908
Referees: Michael Irving, Rob Rorke, Daryl Gelinas

=== Pepperdine ===
Broadcasters: Ari Wolfe, Jarron Collins, and Kelli Tennant
Series History: BYU leads 8-4
Starting Lineups:

- BYU: Tyler Haws, Matt Carlino, Kyle Collinsworth, Nate Austin, Eric Mika
- Pepperdine: Jeremy Major, Atif Russell, Malcolm Brooks, Stacy Davis, Brendan Lane

TheW.tv

Dec 30
7:04 PM PST

Recap

BYU Cougars 74, Pepperdine Waves 80
Scoring by half: 28-40, 46-40
Pts: Tyler Haws 20; Rebs: Kyle Collinsworth 13; Asts: Kyle Collinsworth 7	Pts: Malcolm Brooks 24; Rebs: Stacy Davis 14; Asts: Amadi Udenyi 5

Firestone Fieldhouse
Malibu, CA
Attendance: 2,317
Referees: Ken Ditty, Michael Schyphers, Deron White

=== San Diego ===
Broadcasters: Dave McCann, David Nixon, and Spencer Linton
Series History: BYU leads 6-2
Starting Lineups:

- BYU: Kyle Collinsworth, Tyler Haws, Skyler Halford, Nate Austin, Eric Mika
- San Diego: Christopher Anderson, Johnny Dee, Brett Bailey, Jito Kok, Dennis Kramer

BYUtv

Jan 4
7:05 PM MST

Recap

San Diego Toreros 53, BYU Cougars 87
Scoring by half: 23-41, 30-46
Pts: Chris Sarbaugh 10; Rebs: Simi Fajemisin 5 Asts: Christopher Anderson 4	Pts: Skyler Halford 28; Rebs: Kyle Collinsworth & Nate Austin 7 Asts: Kyle Collinsworth 8

Marriott Center
Provo, UT
Attendance: 15,760
Referees: Glen Mayberry, Ronald Brokenbrough, Kurt Walker

=== Pepperdine ===
Broadcasters: Dave McCann, Blaine Fowler, and Spencer Linton
Series History: BYU leads 8-5
Starting Lineups:

- BYU: Tyler Haws, Skyler Halford, Kyle Collinsworth, Nate Austin, Josh Sharp
- Pepperdine: Jeremy Major, Malcolm Brooks, Lamond Murray Jr., Stacy Davis, Jett Raines

BYUtv

Jan 9
7:05 PM MST

Recap

Pepperdine Wave 72, BYU Cougars 84
Scoring by half: 30-33, 42-51
Pts: Stacy Davis 17; Rebs: Lamond Murray Jr. 6 Asts: Jeremy Major 6	Pts: Tyler Haws 35; Rebs: Kyle Collinsworth 10; Asts: Kyle Collinsworth 9

Marriott Center
Provo, UT
Attendance: 14,012
Referees: Richard Batsell, Nate Harris, Casey McClellan

=== Loyola Marymount ===
Broadcasters: Dave McCann, David Nixon, and Spencer Linton
Series History: Series Even 4-4
Starting Lineups:

- BYU: Kyle Collinsworth, Tyler Haws, Skyler Halford, Nate Austin, Josh Sharp
- LMU: Evan Payne, Anthony Ireland, Nick Stover, Gabe Levin, Alex Osborne

BYUtv

Jan 11
7:05 PM MST

Recap

Loyola Marymount Lions 68, BYU Cougars 91
Scoring by half: 38-37, 30-54
Pts: Anthony Ireland 17; Rebs: Alex Osborne 8 Asts: Anthony Ireland 6	Pts: Tyler Haws 31; Rebs: Kyle Collinsworth & Nate Austin 9 Asts: Kyle Collinsworth 5

Marriott Center
Provo, UT
Attendance: 15,187
Referees: Glen Mayberry, Dennis Flannery, Jeff Ketchu

=== San Francisco ===
Broadcasters: Roxy Bernstein and Corey Williams
Series History: BYU leads 8-7
Starting Lineups:

- BYU: Tyler Haws, Skyler Halford, Kyle Collinsworth, Nate Austin, Eric Mika
- San Francisco: Matt Glover, Avry Holmes, Kruize Pinkins, Mark Tollefsen, Cole Dickerson

ESPNU

Jan 16
6:00 PM PST

Recap

BYU Cougars 83, San Francisco Dons 76
Scoring by half: 34-37, 49-39
Pts: Kyle Collinsworth 19; Rebs: Nate Austin 8 Asts: Tyler Haws, Skyler Halford, Matt Carlino, Josh Sharp, & Frank Bartley IV 1	Pts: Cole Dickerson 26; Rebs: Cole Dickerson 14; Asts: Avry Holmes 5

The Hilltop
San Francisco, CA
Attendance: 2,137
Referees: Greg Nixon, Kevin Brill, Tony Padilla

=== Santa Clara ===
Broadcasters: Glen Kuiper and Dan Belluomini
Series History: BYU leads 19-5
Starting Lineups:

- BYU: Kyle Collinsworth, Tyler Haws, Skyler Halford, Nate Austin, Eric Mika
- Santa Clara: Jerry Brown, Brandon Clark, Jalen Richard, Jared Brownridge, Yannick Atanga

ROOT

Jan 18
7:00 PM PST

Recap

BYU Cougars 91, Santa Clara Broncos 81
Scoring by half: 47-30, 44-51
Pts: Kyle Collinsworth 18; Rebs: Kyle Collinsworth & Nate Austin 7 Asts: Matt Carlino 9	Pts: Jared Brownridge 30; Rebs: Yannick Atanga 6 Asts: Brandon Clark 7

Leavey Center
Santa Clara, CA
Attendance: 2,560
Referees: Michael Greenstein, Horace Shields, Ronald Brokenbrough

=== Portland ===
Broadcasters: Tom Glasgow and Bill Krueger
Series History: BYU leads 9-0
Starting Lineups:

- BYU: Kyle Collinsworth, Tyler Haws, Skyler Halford, Nate Austin, Eric Mika
- Portland: Kevin Bailey, Bryce Pressley, Alec Wintering, Thomas Van Der Mars, Ryan Nicholas

ROOT

Jan 23
7:00 PM PST

Recap

BYU Cougars 110, Portland Pilots 114 (OT)
Scoring by half: 40-45, 40-35 Overtime: 11-11, 12-12, 7-11
Pts: Tyler Haws 48; Rebs: Nate Austin 15; Asts: Matt Carlino 9	Pts: Bobby Sharp & Thomas Van Der Mars 27; Rebs: Thomas Van Der Mars 18; Asts: Kevin Bailey 6

Chiles Center
Portland, OR
Attendance: 2,813
Referees: Greg Nixon, Rob Rorke, Scott Brown

=== Gonzaga ===
Broadcasters: Beth Mowins and Kara Lawson
Series History: Gonzaga leads 5-2
Starting Lineups:

- BYU: Kyle Collinsworth, Tyler Haws, Skyler Halford, Nate Austin, Eric Mika
- Gonzaga: Kyle Dranginis, Kevin Pangos, David Stockton, Przemek Karnowski, Sam Dower Jr.

ESPN2

Jan 25
7:00 PM PST

Recap

BYU Cougars 69, Gonzaga Bulldogs 84
Scoring by half: 33-35, 36-49
Pts: Tyler Haws 23; Rebs: Eric Mika 9 Asts: Kyle Collinsworth 4	Pts: Kevin Pangos 24; Rebs: Przemek Karnowski 5 Asts: Kevin Pangos & David Stockton 7

The Kennel
Spokane, WA
Attendance: 6,000
Referees: Michael Reed, Kevin Brill, Deldre Carr

=== Pacific ===
Broadcasters: Dave McCann, David Nixon, and Spencer Linton
Series History: Series tied 3-3
Starting Lineups:

- BYU: Kyle Collinsworth, Tyler Haws, Skyler Halford, Nate Austin, Eric Mika
- Pacific: Sama Taku, Andrew Bock, Trevin Harris, Ross Rivera, Khalil Kelley

BYUtv

Jan 30
7:05 PM MST

Recap

Pacific Tigers 78, BYU Cougars 88
Scoring by half: 34-45, 44-43
Pts: Tony Gill 15; Rebs: Tony Gill 5 Asts: Andrew Bock & Aaron Short 4	Pts: Tyler Haws 38; Rebs: Eric Mika & Nate Austin 8 Asts: Matt Carlino 6

Marriott Center
Provo, UT
Attendance: 14,262
Referees: Michael Greenstein, Frank Harvey, Casey McClellan

=== Saint Mary's ===
Broadcasters: Beth Mowins and Kara Lawson
Series History: BYU leads 8-6
Starting Lineups:

- BYU: Kyle Collinsworth, Tyler Haws, Skyler Halford, Nate Austin, Eric Mika
- Saint Mary's: Brad Waldow, Kerry Carter, Dane Pineau, Stephen Holt, James Walker III

ESPN2

Feb 1
8:05 PM MST

Recap

Saint Mary's Gaels 71, BYU Cougars 84
Scoring by half: 38-37, 33-47
Pts: Brad Waldow 25; Rebs: Stephen Holt 8 Asts: Stephen Holt 4	Pts: Tyler Haws 33; Rebs: Kyle Collinsworth 9 Asts: Kyle Collinsworth, Nate Austin, & Matt Carlino 2

Marriott Center
Provo, UT
Attendance: 17,982
Referees: Deldre Carr, Marc Beasley, Tom Spitznagel

=== Santa Clara ===
Broadcasters: Roxy Bernstein and Corey Williams
Series History: BYU leads 20-5
Starting Lineups:

- BYU: Kyle Collinsworth, Tyler Haws, Skyler Halford, Nate Austin, Eric Mika
- Santa Clara: John McArthur, Brandon Clark, Jalen Richard, Jared Brownridge, Yannick Atanga

ESPNU

Feb 6
9:05 PM MST

Recap

Santa Clara Broncos 76, BYU Cougars 89
Scoring by half: 40-53, 36-36
Pts: Brandon Clark & Jared Brownridge 16; Rebs: Jerry Brown 6 Asts: Jared Brownridge 4	Pts: Tyler Haws 27; Rebs: Eric Mika 10; Asts: Kyle Collinsworth & Skyler Halford 4

Marriott Center
Provo, UT
Attendance: 12,518
Referees: Michael Irving, Klaus Endrissat, James Giron

=== San Francisco ===
Broadcasters: Spencer Linton, Blaine Fowler, and Lauren Francom
Series History: BYU leads 9-7
Starting Lineups:

- BYU: Tyler Haws, Skyler Halford, Kyle Collinsworth, Nate Austin, Eric Mika
- San Francisco: Matt Glover, Avry Holmes, Kruize Pinkins, Mark Tollefsen, Cole Dickerson

BYUtv

Feb 8
7:05 PM MST

Recap

San Francisco Dons 63, BYU Cougars 68
Scoring by half: 29-32, 34-36
Pts: Tim Derksen 17; Rebs: Cole Dickerson 6 Asts: Matt Glover 4	Pts: Tyler Haws & Kyle Collinsworth 19; Rebs: Nate Austin 16; Asts: Matt Carlino 9

Marriott Center
Provo, UT
Attendance: 18,327
Referees: Tommy Nunez, Horace Shields, Donald McAllister

=== Pacific ===
Broadcasters: Barry Tompkins and Dan Belluomini
Series History: BYU leads 4-3
Starting Lineups:

- BYU: Kyle Collinsworth, Tyler Haws, Skyler Halford, Nate Austin, Eric Mika
- Pacific: Trevin Harris, Tony Gill, Khalil Kelley, T.J. Wallace, Andrew Bock

ROOT

Feb 13
8:00 PM PST

Recap

BYU Cougars 82, Pacific Tigers 89
Scoring by half: 38-35, 44-54
Pts: Matt Carlino 28; Rebs: Nate Austin & Kyle Collinsworth 7 Asts: Kyle Collinsworth 5	Pts: Tony Gill 18; Rebs: Khalil Kelley 9 Asts: Trevin Harris & Andrew Bock 4

Alex G. Spanos Center
Stockton, CA
Attendance: 4,058
Referees: Marc Beasley, Jimmy Casas, Tom Nally

=== Saint Mary's ===
Broadcasters: Beth Mowins and Kara Lawson
Series History: BYU leads 9-6
Starting Lineups:

- BYU: Tyler Haws, Skyler Halford, Kyle Collinsworth, Nate Austin, Eric Mika
- Saint Mary's: Brad Waldow, Kerry Carter, Stephen Holt, Beau Levesque, James Walker III

ESPN2

Feb 15
5:00 PM PST

Recap

BYU Cougars 60, Saint Mary's Gaels 57
Scoring by half: 25-35, 35-22
Pts: Tyler Haws 18; Rebs: Nate Austin 11; Asts: Tyler Haws & Matt Carlino 4	Pts: Brad Waldow 17; Rebs: Brad Waldow 13; Asts: Beau Levesque 4

McKeon Pavilion
Moraga, CA
Attendance: 3,500
Referees: Gregory Nixon, Klaus Endrissat, Brett Nansel

=== Gonzaga ===
Broadcasters: Dave Flemming and Miles Simon
Series History: Gonzaga leads 6-2
Starting Lineups:

- BYU: Kyle Collinsworth, Tyler Haws, Anson Winder, Nate Austin, Josh Sharp
- Gonzaga: Kyle Dranginis, Kevin Pangos, David Stockton, Przemek Karnowski, Sam Dower Jr.

ESPN2

Feb 20
9:05 PM MST

Recap

Gonzaga Bulldogs 65, BYU Cougars 73
Scoring by half: 39-39, 26-34
Pts: Sam Dower, Jr. 14; Rebs: Sam Dower, Jr. 8 Asts: Kyle Dranginis 4	Pts: Anson Winder 17; Rebs: Eric Mika 8 Asts: Matt Carlino 6 Winder 10-10 Free Throws

Marriott Center
Provo, UT
Attendance: 19,136
Referees: Michael Greenstein, Michael Irving, Tommy Nunez

=== Portland ===
Broadcasters: Spencer Linton, Blaine Fowler, and Lauren Francom
Series History: BYU leads 9-1
Starting Lineups:

- BYU: Kyle Collinsworth, Tyler Haws, Anson Winder, Nate Austin, Luke Worthington
- Portland: Bryce Pressley, Bobby Sharp, Thomas Van Der Mars, Ryan Nicholas, David Carr

BYUtv

Feb 22
7:05 PM MST

Recap

Portland Pilots 72, BYU Cougars 89
Scoring by half: 33-46, 39-43
Pts: Ryan Nicholas 17; Rebs: Riley Barker 8 Asts: David Carr 6	Pts: Matt Carlino 30; Rebs: Kyle Collinsworth 11; Asts: Kyle Collinsworth 7

Marriott Center
Provo, UT
Attendance: 17,842
Referees: James Giron, Dennis Flannery, Kurt Walker

=== San Diego ===
Broadcasters: Steve Quis and Jon Crispin
Series History: BYU leads 7-2
Starting Lineups:

- BYU: Kyle Collinsworth, Tyler Haws, Anson Winder, Nate Austin, Luke Worthington
- San Diego: Christopher Anderson, Johnny Dee, Brett Bailey, Jito Kok, Dennis Kramer

ROOT

Mar 1
1:03 PM PST

BYU Cougars 78, San Diego Toreros 70
Scoring by half: 41-33, 37-37
Pts: Tyler Haws 25; Rebs: Nate Austin 10; Asts: Matt Carlino 6	Pts: Christopher Anderson 22; Rebs: Jito Kok 10; Asts: Christopher Anderson 6

The Slim Gym
San Diego, CA
Attendance: 3,889
Referees: Michael Schyphers, Klaus Endrissat, Deldre Carr

=== Loyola Marymount ===
Broadcasters: Dave McCann and Blaine Fowler
Series History: BYU leads 5-4
Starting Lineups:

- BYU: Kyle Collinsworth, Tyler Haws, Anson Winder, Nate Austin, Luke Worthington
- LMU: Evan Payne, Anthony Ireland, Nick Stover, Alex Osborne, Gabe Levin

BYUtv

Mar 8
2:00 PM PST

Recap

Loyola Marymount Lions 74, BYU Cougars 85
Scoring by half: 36-43, 38-42
Pts: Anthony Ireland 19; Rebs: Gabe Levin 10; Asts: Anthony Ireland 4	Pts: Kyle Collinsworth 23; Rebs: Kyle Collinsworth 16; Asts: Anson Winder 3

Orleans Arena
Paradise, NV
Attendance: 7,688
Referees: Frank Harvey, Bruce Hicks, Horace Shields

=== San Francisco ===
Broadcasters: Dave Flemming and Sean Farnham
Series History: BYU leads 10-7
Starting Lineups:

- BYU: Kyle Collinsworth, Tyler Haws, Anson Winder, Nate Austin, Eric Mika
- USF: Matt Glover, Avry Holmes, Kruize Pinkins, Mark Tollefsen, Cole Dickerson

ESPN2

Mar 10
8:00 PM PST

Recap

San Francisco Dons 77, BYU Cougars 79 (OT)
Scoring by half: 37-35, 27-29 Overtime: 13-15
Pts: Cole Dickerson 20; Rebs: Cole Dickerson 10; Asts: Avry Holmes 7	Pts: Tyler Haws 24; Rebs: Kyle Collinsworth 12; Asts: Eric Mika, Tyler Haws, & Kyle Collinsworth 2

Orleans Arena
Paradise, NV
Attendance: 7,168
Referees: Tommy Nunez, Greg Nixon, Deldre Carr

=== WCC Championship: Gonzaga ===
Broadcasters: Dave Flemming and Sean Farnham (ESPN); Dave Ryan and Bill Frieder (Westwood One)
Series History: Gonzaga leads 6-3
Starting Lineups:

- BYU: Kyle Collinsworth, Tyler Haws, Anson Winder, Nate Austin, Eric Mika
- Gonzaga: Kyle Dranginis, Kevin Pangos, David Stockton, Przemek Karnowski, Sam Dower Jr.

ESPN

Mar 11
6:00 PM PDT

Recap

BYU Cougars 64, Gonzaga Bulldogs 75
Scoring by half: 27-44, 37-31
Pts: Tyler Haws 24; Rebs: Eric Mika 10; Asts: Matt Carlino 2	Pts: Sam Dower Jr. 20; Rebs: Sam Dower Jr. 13; Asts: David Stockton 7

Orleans Arena
Paradise, NV
Attendance: 7,898
Referees: Mike Greenstein, Mike Reed, Michael Irving

=== NCAA Tournament: Oregon ===
Broadcasters: Ian Eagle, Jim Spanarkel, and Lewis Johnson (TruTV); Wayne Larrivee and Kelly Tripucka (Westwood One)
Series History: Oregon leads 13-9
Starting Lineups:

- BYU- Tyler Haws, Matt Carlino, Anson Winder, Nate Austin, Eric Mika
- Oregon- Joseph Young, Mike Moser, Johnathan Loyd, Damyean Dotson, Waverly Austin

TruTV

Mar 20
2:11 PM CDT

Recap

BYU Cougars 68, Oregon Ducks 87
Scoring by half: 31-39, 37-48
Pts: Tyler Haws 19; Rebs: Eric Mika 7 Asts: Matt Carlino 5	Pts: Elgin Cook 23; Rebs: Richard Amardi & Elgin Cook 8 Asts: Johnathan Loyd 6

BMO Harris Bradley Center
Milwaukee, WI
Attendance: 17,749
Referees: Terry Wymer, Tommy Nunez, Rodrick Dixon

== Rankings ==
Regular season polls
Poll	Pre- Season	Week 1	Week 2	Week 3	Week 4	Week 5	Week 6	Week 7	Week 8	Week 9	Week 10	Week 11	Week 12	Week 13	Week 14	Week 15	Week 16	Week 17	Week 18 Postseason	Final
AP			RV																	
Coaches			RV																	

Legend
	Increase in ranking
	Decrease in ranking
	Not ranked previous week
(RV)	Received Votes
