= 2013–14 San Diego Toreros men's basketball team =

American college basketball season

2013–14 San Diego Toreros men's basketball

CIT Quarterfinals vs. Pacific, L 60–75
- Conference: West Coast Conference
- Record: 18–17 (7–11 WCC)
- Head coach: Bill Grier (7th season)
- Assistant coaches: Mike Burns; Rodney Tention; Kyle Bankhead
- Home arena: Jenny Craig Pavilion

2013–14 West Coast Conference men's basketball standings
	Conf.				Overall
Team	W		L	PCT	W		L	PCT
Gonzaga †	15	–	3	.833	29	–	7	.806
BYU	13	–	5	.722	23	–	12	.657
San Francisco	13	–	5	.722	21	–	12	.636
Saint Mary's	11	–	7	.611	23	–	12	.657
Pepperdine	8	–	10	.444	15	–	16	.484
San Diego	7	–	11	.389	18	–	17	.514
Portland	7	–	11	.389	15	–	16	.484
Pacific	6	–	12	.333	18	–	16	.529
Santa Clara	6	–	12	.333	14	–	19	.424
Loyola Marymount	4	–	14	.222	13	–	19	.406
† Conference tournament winner

The 2013–14 San Diego Toreros men's basketball team represented the University of San Diego during the 2013–14 NCAA Division I men's basketball season. This was head coach Bill Grier's seventh season at San Diego. The Toreros competed in the West Coast Conference and played their home games at the Jenny Craig Pavilion. They finished the season 18–17, 7–11 in WCC play to finish in a tie for sixth place. They lost in the quarterfinals of the WCC tournament to San Francisco. They were invited to the CollegeInsider.com Postseason Tournament where they defeated Portland State and Sam Houston State to advance to the quarterfinals where they lost to fellow WCC member Pacific.

== Before the season ==
=== Departures ===
Name	Number	Pos.	Height	Weight	Year	Hometown	Notes
Chris Manresa	5	G	6'9"	245	Senior	Rancho Santa Margarita, CA	Graduated
Cameron Miles	20	G	6'1"	175	Senior	Dallas, TX	Graduated
Ken Rancifer	32	G	6'5"	215	Senior	Oakland, CA	Graduated
John Sinis	31	G/F	6'9"	235	RS Sophomore	Patras, Greece	Went Pro, joined Greece's AGO Rethimno

=== Recruits ===
College recruiting information (2013)
Name	Hometown	School	Height	Weight	Commit date
Brett Bailey; F	Spokane, WA	University	6 ft 6 in (1.98 m)	210 lb (95 kg)	Jul 8, 2011
Brett Bailey; F	Recruit ratings: Scout: Rivals: (71)				
Chris Sarbaugh; G	Spokane, WA	Gonzaga Prep; North Idaho	6 ft 3 in (1.91 m)	200 lb (91 kg)	Apr 18, 2013
Chris Sarbaugh; G	Recruit ratings: Scout: Rivals: (JC)				
Overall recruit ranking: Scout: nr Rivals: nr ESPN: nr
Note: In many cases, Scout, Rivals, 247Sports, On3, and ESPN may conflict in their listings of height and weight.; In these cases, the average was taken. ESPN grades are on a 100-point scale.; Sources: "San Diego Toreros 2013 Basketball Commitments". Rivals.; "2013 San Diego Toreros Basketball Commits". Scout.; "ESPN 2013 San Diego Toreros Basketball recruits". ESPN.; "Scout.com Team Recruiting Rankings". Scout.; "2013 Team Ranking". Rivals.

== Roster ==
2013–14 San Diego Toreros men's basketball team
Players
Coaches

Pos.	#	Name	Height	Weight	Year	Previous school	Hometown
G	0	Christopher Anderson	5 ft 7 in (1.7 m)	150 lb (68 kg)	Jr	Canyon	Anaheim Hills, CA
G	1	Johnny Dee	6 ft 0 in (1.83 m)	175 lb (79 kg)	Jr	Rancho Buena Vista	Vista, CA
G	2	Mike Davis	6 ft 2 in (1.88 m)	200 lb (91 kg)	Sr	Phillis Wheatley; Texas Tech	Houston, TX
G	3	Therone Tillett	5 ft 11 in (1.8 m)	185 lb (84 kg)	RS So	John R. Rogers	Spokane, WA
G	4	Nick Kerr	6 ft 3 in (1.91 m)	175 lb (79 kg)	RS So	Torrey Pines	San Diego, CA
G	5	Chris Sarbaugh	6 ft 3 in (1.91 m)	200 lb (91 kg)	So	Gonzaga Prep; North Idaho	Spokane, WA
G	10	Duda Sanadze	6 ft 5 in (1.96 m)	209 lb (95 kg)	RS So	Tbilisi, Georgia
G	13	Keith Stackhouse	6 ft 2 in (1.88 m)	185 lb (84 kg)	RS So	Squalicum	Bellingham, WA
F	15	Thomas Jacobs	6 ft 6 in (1.98 m)	215 lb (98 kg)	RS Jr	Scripps Ranch; Cal State Northridge	San Diego, CA
G	21	Jordan Bickerstaff	5 ft 10 in (1.78 m)	150 lb (68 kg)	RS Fr	Smoky Hill	Denver, CO
F/C	22	Brandon Perry	6 ft 7 in (2.01 m)	265 lb (120 kg)	RS Fr	Taft; Cal State Northridge	Fresno, CA
F	23	Trey Guidry	6 ft 6 in (1.98 m)	215 lb (98 kg)	So	St. Puis X	Houston, TX
F/C	25	Simi Fajemisin	6 ft 10 in (2.08 m)	265 lb (120 kg)	RS Jr	Lynnwood	Lynnwood, WA
F	32	Brett Bailey	6 ft 6 in (1.98 m)	210 lb (95 kg)	Fr	University	Spokane, WA
F/C	33	Jito Kok	6 ft 9 in (2.06 m)	225 lb (102 kg)	So	Canarius Basketball Academy	Wageningen, Netherlands
F	40	Dennis Kramer	6 ft 11 in (2.11 m)	235 lb (107 kg)	Sr	La Costa Canyon	Encinitas, CA

Head coach

- Bill Grier (Oregon)

Assistant coach(es)

- Mike Burns (Central Washington)
- Rodney Tention (San Francisco)
- Kyle Bankhead (Gonzaga)

Legend

- (C) Team captain
- (S) Suspended
- (I) Ineligible
- (W) Walk-on
- Injured
- Current redshirt

== Schedule and results ==
Date time, TV	Opponent	Result	Record	Site city, state
Exhibition
10/26/2013*; 6:00 pm	Cal State Monterey Bay	W 90–81		Jenny Craig Pavilion; San Diego, CA
Non-conference regular season
11/08/2013*; 7:00 pm	South Dakota State; USD Tournament	W 74–70	1–0	Jenny Craig Pavilion; San Diego, CA
11/09/2013*; 7:00 pm, 4SD	Grand Canyon; USD Tournament	W 70–59	2–0	Jenny Craig Pavilion; San Diego, CA
11/14/2013*; 4:00 pm	at Morgan State	W 68–61	3–0	Talmadge L. Hill Field House; Baltimore, MD
11/16/2013*; 4:00 pm	at Northern Kentucky	W 75–44	4–0	The Bank of Kentucky Center; Highland Heights, KY
11/21/2013*; 7:00 pm, FSSD	San Diego Christian; Gulf Coast Showcase Opening Round	W 82–46	5–0	Jenny Craig Pavilion; San Diego, CA
11/25/2013*; 11:30 am	vs. UIC; Gulf Coast Showcase	L 70–74	5–1	Germain Arena; Estero, FL
11/26/2013*; 9:00 am	vs. UNC Greensboro; Gulf Coast Showcase	W 83–71	6–1	Germain Arena; Estero, FL
11/27/2013*; 11:30 am	vs. Southern Illinois; Gulf Coast Showcase	W 59–56	7–1	Germain Arena; Estero, FL
11/30/2013*; 12:00 pm, RTRM	at New Mexico	L 66–73	7–2	The Pit; Albuquerque, NM
12/05/2013*; 8:00 pm, FSSD	No. 24 San Diego State; City Championship	L 64–65	7–3	Jenny Craig Pavilion; San Diego, CA
12/10/2013*; 7:00 pm	Pacifica College	W 84–47	8–3	Jenny Craig Pavilion; San Diego, CA
12/15/2013*; 2:00 pm, FSSD	UC Santa Barbara	L 61–72	8–4	Jenny Craig Pavilion; San Diego, CA
12/21/2013*; 2:00 pm	Southern Utah	W 67–52	9–4	Jenny Craig Pavilion; San Diego, CA
WCC regular season
12/28/2013; 5:00 pm, TV-32	at Pepperdine	L 64–75	9–5 (0–1)	Firestone Fieldhouse; Malibu, CA
12/30/2013; 7:00 pm	at Loyola Marymount	L 62–65	9–6 (0–2)	Gersten Pavilion; Los Angeles, CA
01/04/2014; 6:00 pm, BYUtv	at BYU	L 53–87	9–7 (0–3)	Marriott Center; Provo, UT
01/09/2014; 7:00 pm, TWCSN	Loyola Marymount	W 74–67	10–7 (1–3)	Jenny Craig Pavilion; San Diego, CA
01/11/2014; 6:00 pm, FSSD	Pepperdine	L 65–69	10–8 (1–4)	Jenny Craig Pavilion; San Diego, CA
01/16/2014; 7:00 pm	at Santa Clara	W 69–66	11–8 (2–4)	Leavey Center; Santa Clara, CA
01/18/2014; 7:00 pm, TheW.tv	at San Francisco	L 62–64	11–9 (2–5)	War Memorial Gymnasium; San Francisco, CA
01/23/2014; 7:00 pm, ESPNU	at Gonzaga	L 56–59	11–10 (2–6)	McCarthey Athletic Center; Spokane, WA
01/25/2014; 1:00 pm, TWCSN	at Portland	W 65–63	12–10 (3–6)	Chiles Center; Portland, OR
01/30/2014; 7:00 pm, ESPNU	Saint Mary's	W 61–43	13–10 (4–6)	Jenny Craig Pavilion; San Diego, CA
02/01/2014; 1:00 pm, TWCSN	Pacific	L 67–84	13–11 (4–7)	Jenny Craig Pavilion; San Diego, CA
02/06/2014; 7:00 pm, FSSD	San Francisco	L 67–74	13–12 (4–8)	Jenny Craig Pavilion; San Diego, CA
02/08/2014; 8:00 pm, FSSD	Santa Clara	L 63–69	13–13 (4–9)	Jenny Craig Pavilion; San Diego, CA
02/13/2014; 8:00 pm, ESPNU	at Saint Mary's	L 57–69	13–14 (4–10)	McKeon Pavilion; Moraga, CA
02/15/2014; 7:00 pm, CSNCA	at Pacific	W 70–55	14–14 (5–10)	Alex G. Spanos Center; Stockton, CA
02/20/2014; 6:00 pm, FSSD	Portland	W 61–59	15–14 (6–10)	Jenny Craig Pavilion; San Diego, CA
02/22/2014; 9:00 pm, ESPN2	No. 25 Gonzaga	W 69–66	16–14 (7–10)	Jenny Craig Pavilion; San Diego, CA
03/01/2014; 1:00 pm, TWCSN	BYU	L 70–78	16–15 (7–11)	Jenny Craig Pavilion; San Diego, CA
WCC tournament
03/08/2014; 2:30 pm, BYUtv	vs. San Francisco; Quarterfinals	L 60–69	16–16	Orleans Arena; Paradise, NV
CIT
03/18/2014*; 7:00 pm	Portland State; First round	W 87–65	17–16	Jenny Craig Pavilion; San Diego, CA
03/22/2014*; 5:00 pm	at Sam Houston State; Second round	W 77–72	18–16	Bernard Johnson Coliseum; Huntsville, TX
03/26/2014*; 7:00 pm	at Pacific; Quarterfinals	L 60–75	18–17	Alex G. Spanos Center; Stockton, CA
*Non-conference game. ^{#}Rankings from AP Poll. (#) Tournament seedings in parentheses. All times are in Pacific Time.

== Game summaries ==
=== Exhibition: Cal State Monterey Bay ===
USD TV

Oct 26
6:05 pm PDT

Recap

Cal State Monterey Bay Otters 81, San Diego Toreros 90
Scoring by half: 51-36, 30-54
Pts: Ryan Nitz 14; Rebs: Tim Darkwa & Isaiah Smith 6 Asts: Devin Murphy 4	Pts: Johnny Dee 28; Rebs: Christopher Anderson 8 Asts: Christopher Anderson 7

Jenny Craig Pavilion
San Diego, CA
Attendance: 927
Referees: Tommy Nunez, Matthew Rukasin, Juan Corral

=== South Dakota State ===
Series History: First Meeting

USD TV

Nov 8
7:05 pm PST

Recap

South Dakota State Jackrabbits 70, San Diego Toreros 74
Scoring by half: 34-41, 36-33
Pts: Jake Bittle 18; Rebs: Cody Larson 8 Asts: Cody Larson & Jordan Dykstra 4	Pts: Johnny Dee 27; Rebs: Dennis Kramer 10; Asts: Christopher Anderson 8

Jenny Craig Pavilion
San Diego, CA
Attendance: 2,017
Referees: Dennis Flannery, LaDonte King, Tim Marion

=== Grand Canyon ===
Series History: Grand Canyon leads 10-8
Broadcasters: Matt Rosen, Rex Chapman & Barry Buetel

4SD

Nov 9
6:07 pm PDT

Recap

Grand Canyon Antelopes 59, San Diego Toreros 70
Scoring by half: 27-40, 32-30
Pts: Demetrius Walker 19; Rebs: Killian Larson 15; Asts: Blake Davis 3	Pts: Johnny Dee 17; Rebs: Jito Kok 7 Asts: Christopher Anderson 12

Jenny Craig Pavilion
San Diego, CA
Attendance: 2,122
Referees: Michael Greenstein, Tom Nally, Matthew Rukasin

=== Morgan State ===
Series History: San Diego leads series 1-0

Nov 14
7:00 pm EST

Recap

San Diego Toreros 68, Morgan State Bears 61
Scoring by half: 30-33, 38-28
Pts: Johnny Dee 19; Rebs: Dennis Kramer & Duda Sanadze 7 Asts: Christopher Anderson 4	Pts: Justin Black 22; Rebs: Ian Chiles & Justin Black 5 Asts: Donte Pretlow & Emmanuel Matey 3

Hill Field House
Baltimore, MD
Attendance: 1,145
Referees: Not listed

=== Northern Kentucky ===
Series History: First Meeting

Nov 16
6:07 pm EST

Recap

San Diego Toreros 75, Northern Kentucky Norse 44
Scoring by half: 32-21, 43-23
Pts: Dennis Kramer 15; Rebs: Jito Kok 12; Asts: Johnny Dee 2	Pts: Daniel Camps 11; Rebs: Daniel Camps 7 Asts: Todd Johnson 4

The Bank of Kentucky Center
Highland Heights, KY
Attendance: 1,617
Referees: J.B. Caldwell, James Barker, Alfred Smith

=== Gulf Coast Showcase: San Diego Christian ===
Series History: San Diego leads series 3-0
Broadcasters: Eddie Doucette, Kevin O'Neill & Laura McKeeman

FSSD

Nov 21
7:00 pm PST

Recap

San Diego Christian Hawks 46, San Diego Toreros 82
Scoring by half: 20-47, 26-35
Pts: Andy Saharan 14; Rebs: Jhoan Camacho 9 Asts: Kwaminique Brandon 2	Pts: Thomas Jacobs 14; Rebs: Thomas Jacobs 13; Asts: Christopher Anderson 7

Jenny Craig Pavilion
San Diego, CA
Attendance: 1,217
Referees: Rob Rorke, Scott Harris, Michael Rapp

=== Gulf Coast Showcase: UIC ===
Series History: First Meeting

Nov 25
2:30 pm EST

Recap

UIC Flames 74, San Diego Toreros 70
Scoring by half: 33-31, 41-39
Pts: Kelsey Barlow 17; Rebs: Jake Wiegand 10; Asts: Kelsey Barlow 4	Pts: Johnny Dee 19; Rebs: Dennis Kramer 8 Asts: Christopher Anderson 5

Germain Arena
Estero, FL
Attendance: 233
Referees: Steve Pyatt, Bret Smith, Byron Jarett

=== Gulf Coast Showcase: UNC Greensboro ===
Series History: First Meeting

Nov 26
12:00 pm EST

Recap

UNC Greensboro Spartans 71, San Diego Toreros 83
Scoring by half: 38-45, 33-38
Pts: Kyle Cain 21; Rebs: Kyle Cain 5 Asts: Kyle Cain & Jordan Potts 3	Pts: Duda Sanadze 20; Rebs: Dennis Kramer 7 Asts: Christopher Anderson 5

Germain Arena
Estero, FL
Attendance: N/A
Referees: Steve Skiles, Brent Hampton, Nathan Quick

=== Gulf Coast Showcase: Southern Illinois ===
Series History: San Diego leads series 1-0

Nov 27
2:30 pm EST

Recap

Southern Illinois Salukis 56, San Diego Toreros 59
Scoring by half: 23-20, 33-39
Pts: Desmar Jackson 23; Rebs: Davante Drinkard & Bola Olaniyan 5 Asts: Marcus Fillyaw 4	Pts: Johnny Dee 17; Rebs: Duda Sanadze & Thomas Jacobs 6 Asts: Christopher Anderson 4

Germain Arena
Estero, FL
Attendance: N/A
Referees: Steve Pyatt, Bret Smith, Andrew Walton

=== New Mexico ===
Series History: New Mexico leads 6-2
Broadcasters: Barry Tompkins & Dave Bollwinkel

ROOT NM

Nov 26
1:05 pm MST

Recap

San Diego Toreros 66, New Mexico Lobos 73
Scoring by half: 30-32, 36-41
Pts: Johnny Dee 25; Rebs: Dennis Kramer & Thomas Jacobs 4 Asts: Christopher Anderson 12	Pts: Kendall Williams 28; Rebs: Alex Kirk 11; Asts: Hugh Greenwood 5

The Pit
Albuquerque, NM
Attendance: 15,364
Referees: Kelly Self, Brett Nansel, Jon Stigliano

=== San Diego State ===
Series History: San Diego State leads 27-17
Broadcasters: Eddie Doucette, Kevin O'Neill & Cassie Gallo

FSSD

Dec 5
8:05 pm PST

San Diego State Aztecs 65, San Diego Toreros 64
Scoring by half: 32-32, 33-32
Pts: Xavier Thames 17; Rebs: Josh Davis 15; Asts: Xavier Thames & Winston Shepard 4	Pts: Christopher Anderson 22; Rebs: Thomas Jacobs 8 Asts: Christopher Anderson & Chris Sarbaugh 4

Jenny Craig Pavilion
San Diego, CA
Attendance: 5,100
Referees: Michael Greenstein, Michael Reed, Frank Harvey

=== Pacifica ===
Series History: First Meeting

USD TV

Dec 10
7:05 pm PST

Recap

Pacifica College Gladiators 47, San Diego Toreros 84
Scoring by half: 31-42, 16-42
Pts: Jon Garnica 15; Rebs: Jonathan Earl 7 Asts: Jonathan Earl 4	Pts: Dennis Kramer 21; Rebs: Dennis Kramer 13; Asts: Christopher Anderson 5

Jenny Craig Pavilion
San Diego, CA
Attendance: 1,155
Referees: Klaus Endrissat, Rob Rorke, Jeff Wooten

=== UC Santa Barbara ===
Series History: UC Santa Barbara leads 15-6
Broadcasters: Eddie Doucette, Kevin O'Neill & Stacey Sladen

FSSD

Dec 15
2:05 pm PST

Recap

UC Santa Barbara Gauchos 72, San Diego Toreros 61
Scoring by half: 34-30, 38-31
Pts: Michael Bryson 21; Rebs: Alan Williams 7 Asts: Zalmico Harmon 5	Pts: Duda Sanadze 19; Rebs: Dennis Kramer 11; Asts: Christopher Anderson 9

Jenny Craig Pavilion
San Diego, CA
Attendance: 1,609
Referees: Michael Greenstein, Michael Irving, Tommy Nunez

=== Southern Utah ===
Series History: San Diego leads series 10-0

USD TV

Dec 21
7:05 pm PST

Recap

Southern Utah Thunderbirds 52, San Diego Toreros 67
Scoring by half: 22-33, 30-34
Pts: Eric Rippetoe 14; Rebs: Casey Oliverson 9 Asts: John Marshall & Eric Rippetoe 3	Pts: Johnny Dee 16; Rebs: Dennis Kramer 8 Asts: Christopher Anderson 6

Jenny Craig Pavilion
San Diego, CA
Attendance: 1,101
Referees: Deldre Carr, Dennis Flannery, Marc Beasley

=== Pepperdine ===
Series History: Pepperdine leads 56-40
Broadcaster: Al Epstein

TV-32

Dec 28
5:05 pm PST

Recap

San Diego Toreros 64, Pepperdine Waves 75
Scoring by half: 26-34, 38-41
Pts: Johnny Dee 26; Rebs: Dennis Kramer 8 Asts: Christopher Anderson 5	Pts: Malcolm Brooks 20; Rebs: Stacy Davis 10; Asts: Amadi Udenyi & Stacy Davis 5

Firestone Fieldhouse
Malibu, CA
Attendance: 1,037
Referees: Michael Reed, Horace Shields, Tom Spitznagel

=== Loyola Marymount ===
Series History: Series tied 43-43

LMUSN

Dec 30
7:00 pm PST

Recap

San Diego Toreros 62, Loyola Marymount Lions 65
Scoring by half: 32-28, 30-37
Pts: Johnny Dee 28; Rebs: Duda Sanadze 9 Asts: Christopher Anderson 12	Pts: Evan Payne 16; Rebs: Gabe Levin 8 Asts: Anthony Ireland 8

Gersten Pavilion
Los Angeles, CA
Attendance: 1,810
Referees: Tommy Nunez, Frank Harvey, Brett Nansel

=== BYU ===
Series History: BYU leads 6-2
Broadcasters: Dave McCann, David Nixon & Spencer Linton

BYUtv

Jan 4
7:05 pm MST

San Diego Toreros 53, BYU Cougars 87
Scoring by half: 23-41, 30-46
Pts: Chris Sarbaugh 10; Rebs: Simi Fajemisin 5 Asts: Christopher Anderson 4	Pts: Skyler Halford 28; Rebs: Kyle Collinsworth & Nate Austin 7 Asts: Kyle Collinsworth 8

Marriott Center
Provo, UT
Attendance: 15,760
Referees: Glen Mayberry, Ronald Brokenbrough, Kurt Walker

=== Loyola Marymount ===
Series History: Loyola Marymount leads 34-33
Broadcasters: Ari Wolfe & Jon Crispin

TWCS

Jan 9
7:00 pm PST

Recap

Loyola Marymount Lions 67, San Diego Toreros 74
Scoring by half: 28-25, 39-49
Pts: Anthony Ireland 18; Rebs: Anthony Ireland 5 Asts: Anthony Ireland 3	Pts: Duda Sanadze 22; Rebs: Duda Sanadze, Thomas Jacobs, & Simi Fajemisin 5 Asts: Christopher Anderson & Thomas Jacobs 2

Jenny Craig Pavilion
San Diego, CA
Attendance: 2,605
Referees: Kevin Brille, Gregory Nixon, Scott Harris

=== Pepperdine ===
Series History: Pepperdine leads 57-40
Broadcasters: Eddie Doucette, Brad Holland & Laura McKeeman

FSSD

Jan 11
6:00 pm PST

Recap

Pepperdine Waves 69, San Diego Toreros 65
Scoring by half: 36-30, 33-35
Pts: Stacy Davis 28; Rebs: Stacy Davis 10; Asts: Jeremy Major 5	Pts: Dennis Kramer 17; Rebs: Duda Sanadze & Dennis Kramer 4 Asts: Christopher Anderson 5

Jenny Craig Pavilion
San Diego, CA
Attendance: 2,587
Referees: Bruce Hicks, Donald McAllister, LaDonte King

=== Santa Clara ===
Series History: Santa Clara leads 41-33

Jan 16
7:00 pm PST

Recap

San Diego Toreros 69, Santa Clara Broncos 66
Scoring by half: 28-32, 41-34
Pts: Duda Sanadze 25; Rebs: Brett Bailey & Dennis Kramer 5 Asts: Jito Kok 3	Pts: Brandon Clark 21; Rebs: Evan Roquemore 5 Asts: John McArthur 4

Leavey Center
Santa Clara, CA
Attendance: 1,564
Referees: Tommy Nunez, Dennis Flannery, Klaus Endrissat

== See also ==
- 2013–14 San Diego Toreros women's basketball team
