= 2013–14 Saint Mary's Gaels men's basketball team =

American college basketball season

2013–14 Saint Mary's Gaels men's basketball

NIT, Second Round
- Conference: West Coast Conference
- Record: 23–12 (11–7 WCC)
- Head coach: Randy Bennett (13th season)
- Assistant coaches: Jim Shaw; Marty Clarke; Eran Ganot
- Home arena: McKeon Pavilion

2013–14 West Coast Conference men's basketball standings
	Conf.				Overall
Team	W		L	PCT	W		L	PCT
Gonzaga †	15	–	3	.833	29	–	7	.806
BYU	13	–	5	.722	23	–	12	.657
San Francisco	13	–	5	.722	21	–	12	.636
Saint Mary's	11	–	7	.611	23	–	12	.657
Pepperdine	8	–	10	.444	15	–	16	.484
San Diego	7	–	11	.389	18	–	17	.514
Portland	7	–	11	.389	15	–	16	.484
Pacific	6	–	12	.333	18	–	16	.529
Santa Clara	6	–	12	.333	14	–	19	.424
Loyola Marymount	4	–	14	.222	13	–	19	.406
† Conference tournament winner

The 2013–14 Saint Mary's Gaels men's basketball team represented Saint Mary's College of California during the 2013–14 NCAA Division I men's basketball season. This was head coach Randy Bennett's thirteenth season at Saint Mary's. The Gaels competed in the West Coast Conference and played their home games at the McKeon Pavilion. They finished the season 23–12, 11–7 in WCC play to finish in fourth place. They advanced to the semifinals of the WCC tournament where they lost to Gonzaga. They were invited to the National Invitation Tournament where they defeated Utah in the first round before losing in the second round to Minnesota.

== Departures ==
Name	Number	Pos.	Height	Weight	Year	Hometown	Notes
Jorden Page	1	G	6'1"	180	RS Junior	Maroochydore, Queensland	Graduated
Mitchell Young	3	F	6'9"	235	RS Senior	Logan City, Queensland	Graduated; Signed to play professionally by Cairns Taipans of the NBL
Matthew Dellavedova	4	G	6'4"	190	Senior	Maryborough, Victoria	Graduated; Undrafted in 2013 NBA draft, signed free agent contract with Cleveland Cavaliers
Kyle Rowley	5	C	7'0"	280	Senior	Arima, Trinidad and Tobago	Graduated; Signed to play professionally with Zornotza ST of Spain's LEB Plata
Zach Sanchez	10	G	6'1"	175	RS Sophomore	Bonita, CA	Transferred
Chris Reyes	23	F	6'7"	205	RS Freshman	La Verne, CA	Transferred
Tim Williams	25	F	6'9"	235	RS Senior	Antioch, CA	Graduated

== Recruiting ==
5 newcomers will join the Gaels basketball team for the 2013-14 season. Of the 5 newcomers, 2 will redshirt the season. The newcomers are Kerry Carter, Dane Pineau, Calvin Hermanson, Emmett Naar, and transfer Joe Coleman. Naar and Coleman will redshirt the season.

The Gaels are also joined by two redshirts from 2012-13. Garrett Jackson and Treaven Duffy come off their redshirt seasons and are ready to help the Gaels try to reclaim the WCC title.

In addition to their new recruits, the Gaels enter the season with a new assistant head coach in Marty Clarke and a special assistant to the coach in Jim Shaw.

== Roster ==
2013–14 Saint Mary's Gaels men's basketball team
Players
Coaches

Pos.	#	Name	Height	Weight	Year	Previous school	Hometown
F	00	Brad Waldow	6 ft 9 in (2.06 m)	260 lb (118 kg)	RS Jr	Ponderosa	Shingle Springs, CA
G	2	Paul McCoy	5 ft 11 in (1.8 m)	175 lb (79 kg)	RS Sr	Grant; SMU	Portland, OR
G	3	Kerry Carter	6 ft 2 in (1.88 m)	205 lb (93 kg)	Jr	West Covina; Citrus College	West Covina, CA
F	11	Dane Pineau	6 ft 9 in (2.06 m)	225 lb (102 kg)	Fr	Melbourne Grammar	Melbourne, Australia
G	12	Jordan Giusti	6 ft 2 in (1.88 m)	185 lb (84 kg)	RS So	San Ramon Valley	San Ramon, CA
F	13	Eividas Petrulis	6 ft 7 in (2.01 m)	210 lb (95 kg)	RS So	Šarūnas Marčiulionis Academy	Vilnius, Lithuania
G	14	Stephen Holt	6 ft 4 in (1.93 m)	195 lb (88 kg)	Sr	Jesuit	Portland, OR
F	15	Beau Levesque	6 ft 6 in (1.98 m)	220 lb (100 kg)	RS Sr	De La Salle	Lafayette, CA
F	22	Garrett Jackson	6 ft 6 in (1.98 m)	225 lb (102 kg)	RS Jr	Westview	Portland, OR
F	24	Calvin Hermanson	6 ft 6 in (1.98 m)	200 lb (91 kg)	Fr	Lake Oswego	Lake Oswego, OR
G	25	Treaven Duffy	6 ft 2 in (1.88 m)	190 lb (86 kg)	RS Fr	Cushing Academy	Walnut Creek, CA
C	33	Matt Hodgson	6 ft 11 in (2.11 m)	255 lb (116 kg)	RS Sr	Ipswich Grammar; Southern Utah	Booval, Queensland, Australia
F	35	James Walker III	6 ft 3 in (1.91 m)	185 lb (84 kg)	Sr	Los Alamitos; Citrus	Glendora, CA
G	XX	Emmett Naar (redshirt)	6 ft 1 in (1.85 m)	195 lb (88 kg)	Fr	Sydney Boys	Sydney, Australia
G	XX	Joe Coleman (redshirt)	6 ft 4 in (1.93 m)	210 lb (95 kg)	Jr	Hopkins; Minnesota	Minneapolis, MN

Head coach

- Randy Bennett (UC San Diego)

Assistant coach(es)

- Adam Caporn (Saint Mary's)
- Marty Clarke (Victoria)
- Eran Ganot (Swarthmore)
- Jim Shaw (Western Oregon)

Legend

- (C) Team captain
- (S) Suspended
- (I) Ineligible
- (W) Walk-on
- Injured
- Current redshirt

== Schedule and results ==
Date time, TV	Rank^{#}	Opponent^{#}	Result	Record	Site city, state
Regular season
11/08/2013*; 8:30 pm, Gaels Live		Louisiana Tech	W 83–70	1–0	McKeon Pavilion; Moraga, CA
11/12/2013*; 12:00 am, ESPN2		Akron	W 85–63	2–0	McKeon Pavilion; Moraga, CA
11/14/2013*; 8:30 pm, Gaels Live		North Dakota State	W 78–65	3–0	McKeon Pavilion; Moraga, CA
11/16/2013*; 7:00 pm, Gaels Live		Drake	W 67–63	4–0	McKeon Pavilion; Moraga, CA
11/24/2013*; 5:30 pm, Gaels Live		Alcorn State	W 72–55	5–0	McKeon Pavilion; Moraga, CA
11/30/2013*; 7:00 pm, CSN BAY/ESPN3		Murray State	W 89–64	6–0	McKeon Pavilion; Moraga, CA
12/08/2013*; 5:30 pm, Gaels Live		Eastern Washington	W 93–65	7–0	McKeon Pavilion; Moraga, CA
12/14/2013*; 6:00 pm, RTNW/RTRM		at Boise State; Diamond Head Classic on the mainland	W 82–74	8–0	Taco Bell Arena; Boise, ID
12/19/2013*; 7:00 pm, Gaels Live		American	W 59–44	9–0	McKeon Pavilion; Moraga, CA
12/22/2013*; 8:00 pm, ESPNU		vs. South Carolina; Diamond Head Classic	L 71–78	9–1	Stan Sheriff Center; Honolulu, HI
12/23/2013*; 8:30 pm, ESPNU		vs. Hawaiʻi; Diamond Head Classic Consolation 2nd round	L 74–76	9–2	Stan Sheriff Center; Honolulu, HI
12/25/2013*; 10:30 am, ESPN3		vs. George Mason; Diamond Head Classic 7th place game	L 63–65	9–3	Stan Sheriff Center; Honolulu, HI
12/30/2013; 8:00 pm, CSN CA		at Pacific	W 88–80	10–3 (1–0)	Alex G. Spanos Center; Stockton, CA
01/02/2014; 6:00 pm, ESPN2		at Gonzaga	L 51–73	10–4 (1–1)	McCarthey Athletic Center; Spokane, WA
01/04/2014; 7:00 pm, CSN BAY		at Portland	W 72–63	11–4 (2–1)	Chiles Center; Portland, OR
01/06/2014*; 7:00 pm, Gaels Live		William Jessup	W 84–46	12–4	McKeon Pavilion; Moraga, CA
01/09/2014; 7:00 pm, CSN BAY		Santa Clara	L 55–57	12–5 (2–2)	McKeon Pavilion; Moraga, CA
01/11/2014; 3:00 pm, CSN CA		San Francisco	W 88–73	13–5 (3–2)	McKeon Pavilion; Moraga, CA
01/18/2014; 5:00 pm, TheW.tv		Pacific	W 79–73	14–5 (4–2)	McKeon Pavilion; Moraga, CA
01/23/2014; 7:00 pm, TheW.tv		Pepperdine	W 80–74	15–5 (5–2)	McKeon Pavilion; Moraga, CA
01/25/2014; 3:00 pm, CSN CA		Loyola Marymount	W 89–61	16–5 (6–2)	McKeon Pavilion; Moraga, CA
01/30/2014; 7:00 pm, ESPNU		at San Diego	L 43–61	16–6 (6–3)	Jenny Craig Pavilion; San Diego, CA
02/01/2014; 7:00 pm, ESPN2		at BYU	L 71–84	16–7 (6–4)	Marriott Center; Provo, UT
02/06/2014; 8:00 pm, CSN CA		at Loyola Marymount	W 77–58	17–7 (7–4)	Gersten Pavilion; Los Angeles, CA
02/08/2014; 1:00 pm, CSN CA		at Pepperdine	W 69-67 ^{OT}	18-7 (8-4)	Firestone Fieldhouse; Malibu, CA
02/13/2014; 8:00 pm, ESPNU		San Diego	W 69-57	19-7 (9-4)	McKeon Pavilion; Moraga, CA
02/15/2014; 5:00 pm, ESPN2		BYU	L 57–60	19–8 (9–5)	McKeon Pavilion; Moraga, CA
02/20/2014; 8:00 pm, CSN CA		at San Francisco	L 62–73	19–9 (9–6)	War Memorial Gymnasium; San Francisco, CA
02/22/2014; 1:00 pm, CSN CA		at Santa Clara	W 76–54	20–9 (10–6)	Leavey Center; Santa Clara, CA
02/27/2014; 6:00 pm, CSN BAY		Portland	W 70-61	21–9 (11–6)	McKeon Pavilion; Moraga, CA
03/01/2014; 7:00 pm, ESPN2		Gonzaga	L 47–75	21–10 (11–7)	McKeon Pavilion; Moraga, CA
WCC tournament
03/08/2014; 8:30 pm, ESPN2		vs. Pepperdine; Quarterfinals	W 80–69	22–10	Orleans Arena; Paradise, NV
03/10/2014; 6:00 pm, ESPN		vs. Gonzaga; Semifinals	L 54–70	22–11	Orleans Arena; Paradise, NV
NIT
03/18/2014*; 8:00 pm, ESPN2	No. (4)	(5) Utah; First round	W 70–58	23–11	McKeon Pavilion; Moraga, CA
03/23/2014*; 12:00 pm, ESPN2	No. (4)	(1) Minnesota; Second round	L 55–63	23–12	Williams Arena; Minneapolis, MN
*Non-conference game. ^{#}Rankings from AP Poll, (#) during NIT is seed within region. (#) Tournament seedings in parentheses. All times are in Pacific Time.

== Game summaries ==
=== Louisiana Tech ===
Series History: Louisiana Tech leads 1-0

Nov 8
8:30 PM PST

Recap

Louisiana Tech Bulldogs 70, Saint Mary's Gaels 83
Scoring by half: 34-38, 36-45
Pts: Raheem Appleby 18; Rebs: Micahle Kyser 8 Asts: Kenneth Smith 5	Pts: Brad Waldow 28; Rebs: Brad Waldow 8 Asts: Stephen Holt 6

McKeon Pavilion
Moraga, CA
Attendance: 2,825
Referees: Horace Shields, Marc Beasley, Matthew Rukasin, Aaron Locks

=== Akron ===
Series History: Akron leads 1-0
Broadcasters: Carter Blackburn and Bob Valvano

ESPN2

Nov 12
12:00 AM PST

Recap

Akron Zips 63, Saint Mary's Gaels 85
Scoring by half: 31-38, 32-47
Pts: Demetrius Treadwell 17; Rebs: Demetrius Treadwell 12; Asts: Quincy Diggs 3	Pts: Brad Waldow 16; Rebs: Garrett Jackson & Matt Hodgson 4 Asts: Stephen Holt 7

McKeon Pavilion
Moraga, CA
Attendance: 2,245
Referees: Glen Mayberry, Richard Batsell, Dennis Flannery Jr.

=== North Dakota State ===
Series History: First Meeting

Nov 14
8:30 PM PST

Recap

North Dakota State Bison 65, Saint Mary's Gaels 78
Scoring by half: 27-34, 38-44
Pts: Marshall Bjorklund 23; Rebs: Trayvonn Wright 6 Asts: Taylor Braun 5	Pts: Brad Waldow 18; Rebs: Brad Waldow 10; Asts: Stephen Holt 6

McKeon Pavilion
Moraga, CA
Attendance: 2,178
Referees: Ken Ditty, Rob Rorke, Nate Harris

=== Drake ===
Series History: Saint Mary's leads 2-0

Nov 16
7:00 PM PST

Recap

Drake Bulldogs 63, Saint Mary's Gaels 67
Scoring by half: 23-33, 40-34
Pts: Richard Carter 18; Rebs: Richard Carter, Seth Vandeest, Jacob Enevold, & Daddy Ugbede 6 Asts: Richard Carter 5	Pts: Beau Levesque 16; Rebs: Brad Waldow 13; Asts: Jordan Giusti & Beau Levesque 4

McKeon Pavilion
Moraga, CA
Attendance: 2,495
Referees: Michael Greenstein, Michael Irving, Kevin Brill

=== Alcorn State ===
Series History: First Meeting

Nov 24
5:30 PM PST

Recap

Alcorn State Braves 55, Saint Mary's Gaels 72
Scoring by half: 27-34, 38-44
Pts: Octavius Brown 16; Rebs: Octavius Brown & Josh Nicholas 5 Asts: Shaunessy Smith, Anthony Evans & Devontae Hampton 2	Pts: Kerry Carter 15; Rebs: Garrett Jackson 12; Asts: Stephen Holt 5

McKeon Pavilion
Moraga, CA
Attendance: 2,349
Referees: Scott Harris, Sam Haddad, Justin Van Duyne

=== Murray State ===
Series History: Saint Mary's leads 2-1
Broadcasters: Glen Kuiper and Dan Belluomini

CSN BAY

Nov 30
8:05 PM PST

Recap

Murray State Racers 63, Saint Mary's Gaels 85
Scoring by half: 31-38, 32-47
Pts: Demetrius Treadwell 17; Rebs: Demetrius Treadwell 12; Asts: Quincy Diggs 3	Pts: Brad Waldow 16; Rebs: Garrett Jackson & Matt Hodgson 4 Asts: Stephen Holt 7

McKeon Pavilion
Moraga, CA
Attendance: 2,245
Referees: Glen Mayberry, Richard Batsell, Dennis Flannery Jr.

=== Eastern Washington ===
Series History: First Meeting

Dec 8
5:30 PM PST

Eastern Washington Eagles 65, Saint Mary's Gaels 93
Scoring by half: 26-41, 39-52
Pts: Tyler Harvey 20; Rebs: Venky Jois 11; Asts: Parker Kelly, Drew Brandon, & Venky Jois 2	Pts: Brad Waldow 24; Rebs: Garrett Jackson 12; Asts: Stephen Holt 6

McKeon Pavilion
Moraga, CA
Attendance: 2,117
Referees: Michael Reed, Michael Irving, Horace Shields

=== Boise State ===
Series History: Boise State leads 7-4
Broadcasters: Jerry Schemmel and Joe Cravens

ROOT NW
ROOT RM

Dec 14
4:05 PM MST

Recap

Saint Mary's Gaels 82, Boise State Broncos 74
Scoring by half: 46-44, 36-30
Pts: Stephen Holt 24; Rebs: Brad Waldow 11; Asts: Stephen Holt 6	Pts: Derrick Marks 22; Rebs: Ryan Watkins & Derrick Marks 6 Asts: Derrick Marks 5

Taco Bell Arena
Boise, ID
Attendance: 8,234
Referees: Gregory Nixon, Brett Nansel, Marc Beasley

=== American University ===
Series History: Saint Mary's leads 2-0

Dec 19
7:00 PM PST

Recap

American Eagles 44, Saint Mary's Gaels 59
Scoring by half: 23-30, 21-29
Pts: Darius Gardner & Kyle Kager 13; Rebs: Yilret Yiljep 5 Asts: Tony Wroblicky 4	Pts: Brad Waldow 17; Rebs: Garrett Jackson 10; Asts: Brad Waldow & Beau Levesque 3

McKeon Pavilion
Moraga, CA
Attendance: 2,148
Referees: Bruce Hicks, Dennis Flannery, Matt Morales

=== Diamond Head Classic: South Carolina ===
Series History: First Meeting
Broadcasters: Roxy Bernstein and Miles Simon

ESPNU

Dec 22
6:00 PM HAST

Recap

South Carolina Gamecocks 78, Saint Mary's Gaels 71
Scoring by half: 33-27, 45-44
Pts: Tyrone Johnson 16; Rebs: Demetrius Henry 8 Asts: Sindariou Thornwell, Tyrone Johnson, Duane Notice, & Brenton Williams 3	Pts: Brad Waldow 20; Rebs: Beau Levesque 8 Asts: Stephen Holt 6

Stan Sheriff Center
Honolulu, HI
Attendance: N/A
Referees: Larry Spaudling, Jason Baker, Thomas Yoshida

=== Diamond Head Classic: Hawaii ===
Broadcasters: Roxy Bernstein and Miles Simon

ESPNU

Dec 23
6:30 PM HAST

Recap

Saint Mary's Gaels 74, Hawaii Rainbow Warriors 76
Scoring by half: 39-43, 35-33
Pts: Brad Waldow 17; Rebs: Brad Waldow 9 Asts: Stephen Holt 8	Pts: Christian Standhardinger 22; Rebs: Christian Standhardinger 9 Asts: Keith Shamburger 6

Stan Sheriff Center
Honolulu, HI
Attendance: 6,438
Referees: Ron Groover, Lee Cassell, Tommy Short

=== Diamond Head Classic: George Mason ===
Series History: First Meeting
Broadcasters: Kanoa Leahey and Dino Gaudio

ESPN3

Dec 25
8:30 AM HAST

Recap

George Mason Colonials 65, Saint Mary's Gaels 63
Scoring by half: 26-31, 39-32
Pts: Bryon Allen & Patrick Holloway 15; Rebs: Johnny Williams, Bryon Allen, & Erik Copes 4 Asts: Marko Gujanicic 2	Pts: Stephen Holt & James Walker III 14; Rebs: Matt Hodgson 7 Asts: Beau Levesque 4

Stan Sheriff Center
Honolulu, HI
Attendance: N/A
Referees: Don Daly, Thomas Yoshida, Todd Apo

=== Pacific ===
Series History: Saint Mary's leads 66-43
Broadcasters: Barry Tompkins and Dan Belluomini

CSNCA

Dec 30
8:00 PM PST

Recap

Saint Mary's Gaels 88, Pacific Tigers 80
Scoring by half: 45-39, 43-41
Pts: Beau Levesque 18; Rebs: Brad Waldow & Beau Levesque 8 Asts: Stephen Holt 8	Pts: Andrew Bock 23; Rebs: Tony Gill 12; Asts: Trevin Harris 2

Alex G. Spanos Center
Stockton, CA
Attendance: 4,015
Referees: Michael Irving, Glen Mayberry, Tony Padilla

=== Gonzaga ===
Series History: Gonzaga leads series 57-27
Broadcasters: Dave Flemming and Sean Farnham

ESPN2

Jan 2
6:00 pm PST

Recap

Saint Mary's Gaels 51, Gonzaga Bulldogs 73
Scoring by half: 22-36, 29-37
Pts: Beau Levesque 12; Rebs: Brad Waldow, Beau Levesque, James Walker III, & Dane Pineau 3 Asts: Jordan Giusti & Matt Hodgson 1	Pts: Kevin Pangos & Przemek Karnowski 15; Rebs: Przemek Karnowski 9 Asts: Kyle Dranginis & Kevin Pangos 4

McCarthey Athletic Center
Spokane, WA
Attendance: 6,000
Referees: Gregory Nixon, Tommy Nunez, Michael Scyphers

=== Portland ===
Series History: Saint Mary's leads 56-29
Broadcasters: Tom Glasgow and Bill Krueger

CSN BAY

Jan 4
8:00 PM PST

Saint Mary's Gaels 72, Portland Pilots 63
Scoring by half: 39-33, 33-30
Pts: Stephen Holt 19; Rebs: Brad Waldow 8 Asts: Stephen Holt & James Walker III 2	Pts: Ryan Nicholas 12; Rebs: Thomas Van Der Mars 8 Asts: Kevin Bailey, Bryce Pressley, & Alec Wnitering 3

Chiles Center
Portland, OR
Attendance: 2,304
Referees: Richard Batsell, Klaus Endrissat, Jeff Ketchu

=== William Jessup ===
Series History: First Meeting

Jan 6
7:00 pm PST

Recap

William Jessup Warriors 46, Saint Mary's Gaels 84
Scoring by half: 20-36, 26-38
Pts: Caleb Richey 11; Rebs: Caleb Richey 8 Asts: Caleb Richey 4	Pts: Kerry Carter 19; Rebs: Brad Waldow & Matt Hodgson 8 Asts: Jordan Gusti 5

McKeon Pavilion
Moraga, CA
Attendance: 1,884
Referees: Sam Haddad, Tim Marion, Juan Corral

=== Santa Clara ===
Series History: Santa Clara leads 136-82
Broadcasters: Barry Tompkins and Dan Belluomini

CSN BAY

Jan 9
7:00 PM PST

Recap

Santa Clara Broncos 57, Saint Mary's Gaels 55
Scoring by half: 20-29, 37-26
Pts: Jared Brownridge 23; Rebs: Jared Brownridge 6 Asts: Brandon Clark & Evan Roquemore 2	Pts: Brad Waldow 17; Rebs: Brad Waldow 14; Asts: Stephen Holt 5

McKeon Pavilion
Moraga, CA
Attendance: 3,500
Referees: Michael Reed, Ken Ditty, Mark Cook

=== San Francisco ===
Series History: San Francisco leads 103-72
Broadcasters: Glen Kuiper and Dan Belluomini

CSNCA

Jan 11
3:00 PM PST

Recap

San Francisco Dons 73, Saint Mary's Gaels 88
Scoring by half: 28-43, 45-45
Pts: Avry Holmes 17; Rebs: Kruize Pinkins 9 Asts: Mark Tollefsen 3	Pts: Stephen Holt 21; Rebs: Brad Waldow 7 Asts: Stephen Holt 5

McKeon Pavilion
Moraga, CA
Attendance: 3,500
Referees: Frank Harvey, Horace Shields, Marc Beasley
