= Brett Bailey (basketball) =

American professional basketball player

Personal information
- Born: June 28, 1994 (age 32) Spokane, Washington, U.S.
- Listed height: 6 ft 6 in (1.98 m)
- Listed weight: 205 lb (93 kg)

Career information
- High school: University (Spokane Valley, Washington)
- College: San Diego (2013–2017)
- NBA draft: 2017: undrafted
- Playing career: 2017–present
- Position: Small forward

Career history
- 2017: MZT Skopje

Brett Bailey (born June 28, 1994) is an American professional basketball player who last played for MZT Skopje of the Macedonian League. He played college basketball at San Diego Toreros (2013–2017)

== Professional career ==
After graduating from San Diego Toreros, in 2017, he signed with Macedonian basketball club MZT Skopje. On November 7, 2017, he left MZT.

== Career statistics ==
Legend
GP	Games played	GS	Games started	MPG	Minutes per game
FG%	Field goal percentage	3P%	3-point field goal percentage	FT%	Free throw percentage
RPG	Rebounds per game	APG	Assists per game	SPG	Steals per game
BPG	Blocks per game	PPG	Points per game	**Bold**	Career high

=== College ===
Year	Team	GP	GS	MPG	FG%	3P%	FT%	RPG	APG	SPG	BPG	PPG
2013–14	San Diego	**35**	10	13.2	.410	.333	.447	2.0	.3	.3	.1	3.3
2014–15	San Diego	30	12	11.9	.373	.316	.421	2.6	.4	.2	.1	2.3
2015–16	San Diego	30	26	24.1	.374	.181	.625	4.8	1.3	.5	**.4**	6.9
2016–17	San Diego	31	**31**	**33.9**	**.434**	**.347**	**.757**	**6.9**	**1.7**	**.7**	**.4**	**15.6**
Career		126	79	20.6	.407	.286	.664	4.0	.9	.4	.2	7.0
