= Blaine Fowler =

American sports analyst

No. 16
- Position: Quarterback

Personal information
- Born: Provo, Utah, U.S.
- Listed height: 5 ft 11 in (1.80 m)
- Listed weight: 175 lb (79 kg)

Career information
- High school: Elmira Free (Elmira, New York)
- College: BYU (1981-1985)
- NFL draft: 1986: undrafted

Awards and highlights
- National champion (1984)

Blaine Fowler is a college football and men's college basketball sports analyst in the Mountain West Conference for NBC Sports Network basketball broadcasts. He also provides analysis for the BYU Cougars football team and men's basketball West Coast Conference games for BYUtv Sports. He also does analyses on the BYUtv magazine program True Blue. He currently works alongside Dave McCann on BYUtv Sports. Until the network ceased in 2012, he worked alongside Ari Wolfe for football broadcasts on Mtn.

Fowler was born in Provo, Utah to Kirk and Barbara Fowler, who relocated to Elmira, New York where Blaine attended Elmira Free Academy. He became a multi-sport athlete participating in football, basketball, and track. In high school Fowler won multiple awards in the state of New York. He lettered all four years as a football player, three years in basketball, twice in track, was placed on the all-area and all-league teams in football for three years, was placed on the all-state team twice, and was once made the Upstate New York player of the Year. Elmira Free Academy won the state championship three of the four years Fowler played for them.

After high school Fowler returned to his birth town as a quarterback at Brigham Young University, where he would play from 1981-85. In 1984 Fowler helped lead the Cougars to a national championship. Robbie Bosco was knocked out of the game during the first quarter of the Holiday Bowl against Michigan, and Fowler was sent in to play until Bosco returned during the fourth quarter.

After graduating, Fowler went on to play in the CFL. Fowler left the CFL and return to Utah where he began calling college football for KSL-TV. Since then Fowler has gone on to call over 500 broadcasts as an analyst or sideline reporter for KSL, Video West Sports, the Blue and White Network (w/ Craig Bolerjack (1995-96), Randy Rosenbloom (1997), & McCann (1998)), SportsWest Productions (alongside McCann and Tom Kirkland), The Mtn., Versus, and BYUtv.
