= Dave McCann (sportscaster) =

American sportscaster

- Born: David Matthew McCann; Orem, Utah, U.S.
- Education: Brigham Young University (BA)
- Occupation: sportscaster
- Employer: BYUtv
- Spouse: Colleen Parsons (m. 1989)

David Matthew McCann is an American play-by-play commentator, sportscaster, and television anchor. McCann is currently the studio host for BYUtv's True Blue, co-host for the Countdown to Kickoff Pregame Show and the Postgame Show, and is the lead play-by-play announcer for BYUtv's college football and men's basketball. McCann occasionally calls women's college basketball with Kristen Kozlowski and college baseball games with Gary Sheide for BYUtv. Prior to that, McCann was the evening anchor for KSL-TV in Salt Lake City, Utah.

== Early life and education ==
McCann was born to Dale Reese McCann and Andrea Marie Schmidt and raised in Orem, Utah. McCann is the third of 10 children in his family and is a member of the Church of Jesus Christ of Latter-day Saints. McCann attended and graduated from Orem High School in 1985. McCann attended Ricks College, and then left to serve a two-year mission for the church in San Antonio, Texas. Upon his return he enrolled at Brigham Young University (BYU) where he graduated with a degree in broadcasting in 1991.

== Career ==
In 1991, McCann was hired by ABC's Good Morning America to be their first sports reporter. After a few years at ABC, McCann was hired by KLAS in Las Vegas, Nevada, where he was the sports anchor for 13 years.

While in Las Vegas, McCann was also granted additional duties, as the voice of UNLV's football radio play-by-play for 8 seasons (1996–1997 and 2004–2009). McCann also called men's basketball TV home games for the Rebels on KUPN and MWC broadcasts for football and the women's basketball tournament games for SportsWest Productions (1998–2005).

As KLAS rotated through anchors, McCann continued to remain a strong hold for the station. After 13 seasons as the sports anchor, McCann was offered the chance to be a co-anchor for "8 News Now This Morning." McCann co-hosted the show with Dayna Roselli until June 2012.

In 2007, BYUtv contacted McCann about being a broadcaster for upcoming BYU men's basketball games in the Las Vegas Invitational. McCann called 3 games during the tournament. In 2009, BYUtv again contacted McCann about doing college basketball games for the network during the upcoming Las Vegas Classic. McCann again accepted, but this time was hired to be the lead play-by-play man for all BYUtv men's basketball games. His contract with the network began December 5, 2009. For most men's college basketball broadcasts in 2009 and 2010 BYUtv used a tandem of McCann doing play-by-play, Andy Toolson as the analyst, and Jarom Jordan as the sideline reporter, though Dave Bollwinkel was the analyst with McCann for the 2009 Las Vegas Classic championship game. In 2011, Toolson left the BYUtv Sports team. BYUtv hired Blaine Fowler and Steve Cleveland to take over the role of analyst for the 2011-12 season's broadcasts. Robbie Bullough replaced Jarom Jordan as the sideline reporter for most home games, but BYUtv didn't use a sideline reporter for every broadcast.

In the fall of 2010, BYUtv began looking for a new studio host for the True Blue sports magazine program. McCann was eventually hired to be the host. He began running the show on August 25, 2010, replacing long time producer Toni Cook after she graduated from BYU. Despite becoming the leading sports man for BYUtv, McCann continued to operate on KLAS. McCann would fly into Salt Lake City and then drive from Salt Lake to Provo for BYUtv games and to record shows, but when he wasn't recording or broadcasting events for BYUtv he continued to be the co-host for "8 News Now This Morning."

In 2011, BYU's football team became an independent FBS team. BYUtv created a full-hour pre-game show and a half-hour post-game show to help get fans ready for the games. McCann was hired as one of the hosts, along with Alema Harrington. Kathy Aiken provided reports on the players. Sheide, Fowler, and David Nixon provided analysis and keys to the game. Bullough and Greg Wrubell provided reports from the stadium.

For home games, BYUtv was authorized to produce their own broadcast. McCann was the play-by-play man, with Fowler or Sheide providing the analysis.

On March 12, 2012, it was announced that McCann would leave KLAS. McCann moved from Las Vegas to the Salt Lake area to work for KSL-TV. McCann and Mike Headrick replaced the retiring Bruce Lindsay as co-anchors with Nadine Wimmer on KSL's evening newscasts. The job at KSL began in June 2012.

McCann continues doing football, basketball, and True Blue for BYUtv in addition to taking on the new responsibilities.

McCann also alternated for a time with Wimmer and Headrick in solo anchoring "Deseret News Sunday Edition". The program's predecessor, "Sunday Edition" was previously anchored by Lindsay (until his retirement) and then by Richard Piatt before McCann, Wimmer and Headrick took on the assignment.. In 2019, Doug Wright assumed hosting duties for the program, replacing McCann, Wimmer, and Headrick..

== Personal life ==
McCann married to fellow BYU classmate Colleen Parsons in 1989.
