= Ari Wolfe =

American sportscaster (born 1971)

Ari Michael Wolfe
- Born: Ari Michael Wolfe; January 7, 1971 (age 55); Philadelphia, Pennsylvania, U.S.
- Education: Emory University; University of Southern California
- Occupation: Sportscaster
- Years active: 1998–present

Ari Michael Wolfe (born January 7, 1971) is an American sportscaster. Wolfe currently announces games on ESPN, Stadium, Tennis Channel, Pac-12 Networks, and NBC Sports, and serves as an anchor and reporter for the NFL Network. Additionally, he also calls Kansas City Chiefs preseason games.

== Early life and career ==
Wolfe was born in Philadelphia, Pennsylvania, and raised in Madison, Wisconsin. He currently resides in Los Angeles, California. Wolfe graduated from Emory University in 1994 and later earned his master's degree at the University of Southern California. As a student, Wolfe did both play-by-play and color commentary for the Trojans' basketball, football, and baseball teams on KSCR (104.7 FM) in Los Angeles. He also hosted the sports talk show Blackjack and the Wolfe Attack.

Before moving into commentary, Wolfe worked out of Los Angeles as a Highlight Coordinator, creating highlight packages of NFL football games for Fox NFL Sunday.

== Broadcasting career ==
Since graduating from USC in 1997, Wolfe has called games in college and professional sports. He calls events for NFL Network, ESPN, the Kansas City Chiefs, CBS Sports Network, Tennis Channel, Pac-12 Networks, NBC Sports and Stadium Network. Since 2009, he has also worked as an anchor and reporter for NFL Network. Wolfe is a two-time Emmy Award winner.

Wolfe currently calls college football and college basketball for ESPN and Stadium Network with games airing on Facebook. He joined Stadium in 2014 and his primary role is commentating on Mountain West Conference games. In 2009, marked the beginning of Wolfe's work for MTN and BTN. Wolfe served as the play-by-play announcer for football, and men's basketball games. Wolfe left BTN following the 2010 season, while his work with the Mountain West Conference continued until the network ceased operations in 2012. Wolfe has since called Mountain West football games for Root Sports and the Mountain West Network. Wolfe won his 2nd Emmy for his work during the 2014 Mountain West college football season on Root Sports.

Wolfe began calling tennis for the Tennis Channel in 2017 and at the start of 2019, he agreed on a contract West Tennis lasting until 2022. For the 2019 Mountain West Tennis Championships, Wolfe served as the analyst on the Mountain West Digital Network.

In 1998, Wolfe began his play-by-play career as the voice of the Albany Firebirds, serving in that role for six seasons. When the Firebirds left the Arena Football League (AFL), Wolfe was hired to be the play-by-play voice for the Philadelphia Soul, where he remained until 2008. Leading up to the 2018 season, Wolfe called arena games for CBS Sports Network, OLN, ESPN, Versus, and the NFL Network.

From 2005 to 2009, Wolfe was the commentator for the Louisville Cardinals football and men's basketball games. In 2005, Wolfe won his first Sports Emmy. It was in the Outstanding Play-by-Play category. In addition to play-by-play at Louisville, Wolfe also hosted Courtside with Rick Pitino and Kickoff with Coach K.

ESPN hired him as the play-by-play man for the Madden Challenge in 2007, shown on Super Bowl Sunday on ESPN2 and for the Big East Conference.

In 2019, Wolfe began calling Kansas City Chiefs games for the team's preseason television network, alongside color analyst Trent Green.

In 2025, Wolfe returned to the arena football broadcast booth as main play-by-play voice of Arena Football One on Vice TV's Sunday Night at the Arena.
