= Barry Tompkins =

American sportscaster (born 1940)

Barry David Tompkins (born May 2, 1940) is an American sportscaster. He is better known for his work as a boxing commentator, but he has covered football and other sports.

== Early life ==
Tompkins was born and raised in San Francisco.

== Career ==
=== KCBS, KPIX, WNBC, NBC Sports and KRON ===
He began his broadcasting career at San Francisco radio station KCBS in 1965. Tompkins was hired as sports director at the San Francisco CBS television affiliate, KPIX-TV.

In 1974, he moved to New York to join WNBC-TV as a sports anchor and feature reporter, before moving to NBC Sports in 1975 to host weekly radio shows as well as television play-by-play for basketball and football. Tompkins spent five years at NBC.

Tompkins returned to San Francisco in 1978 and joined then-NBC affiliate KRON-TV as sports director, while continuing to cover Pac-10 basketball for NBC as well as feature stories for its NFL pre-game show. He left KRON in 1980 to join the then-fledgling cable channel HBO.

=== HBO (1980-1988) ===
At HBO, Tompkins joined HBO Boxing, with Larry Merchant and Sugar Ray Leonard. He called fights at HBO for many years and some of his commentaries became famous, such as his call when Alexis Argüello was hurt by Aaron Pryor in round fourteen of their Battle of the Champions (Arguello...oh! Arguello is hurt!!), when Héctor Camacho was buckled by Edwin Rosario in round five of their fight (Camacho had never been hurt before!) and when Mike Tyson won the WBC world Heavyweight title with a second-round knockout of Trevor Berbick (And we have a new era in boxing.). Tompkins also co-hosted HBO's baseball program, Race for the Pennant.

Even though Tompkins had two years remaining on his contract, HBO replaced him in 1988 with Jim Lampley. Tompkins spent ten years at HBO.

In 1992, he won the Sam Taub Award for excellence in boxing broadcasting journalism.

=== KIRO (1986-88) ===
From 1986-88, Tompkins called University of Washington Huskies football games alongside UW legend Don Heinrich on 710 KIRO (AM) radio.

=== Rocky IV and ESPN ===
Tompkins made his acting debut in 1985, when he portrayed a USA Network sportscaster during the Rocky Balboa-Ivan Drago fight in Rocky IV. Later he moved to the ESPN network, where he did play-by-play on Thursday Night Fights alongside Al Bernstein. He also did college basketball, The French Open and many other tennis tournaments, the Tour De France, World Track and Field and Swimming and Diving Championships as well as the World Gymnastics Championships. During that time he continued to be "The Voice" of Pac 10 (now 12) Conference football for various syndicators. Tompkins spent eight years at ESPN.

=== Fox Sports ===
In 1995 Tompkins left ESPN to join Fox Sports as the play-by-play announcer of Sunday Night Fights, and he began traveling through the United States alongside Sean O'Grady and Rich Marotta. Tompkins continued as the lead play-by—play commentator of FSN's coverage of Pac-12 football with Petros Papadakis and basketball with Dan Belluomini, Marques Johnson, Don MacLean and Ernie Kent through 2011. He also commentated much of FSN's poker coverage, including the Aussie Millions and Poker Dome Challenge. Tompkins spent fourteen years at Fox Sports.

=== Western Athletic Conference ===
In July 2011 it was announced that Tompkins would leave Pac-12 football broadcasts and instead be the new play-by-play man for the WAC Sports Network, going into its second season. Tompkins' fight duties and college basketball games with FSN continued. Tompkins called nine broadcasts with Joe Glenn during the 2011 season.

=== Mountain West Conference ===
The WAC Sports Network folded after 2011 allowing Tompkins to become a free agent in terms of college football sports broadcasting for 2012. He was hired by the Mountain West Conference to serve as their #1 play-by-play broadcaster for the new MWC regional package on Time Warner Cable SportsNet (started after Mtn folded after spring 2012). He was assigned Jay Leeuwenburg as his color analyst.

=== ShoBox and ShoExtreme ===
At age 72, Tompkins joined Showtime Sports on February 18, 2012, as blow-by-blow voice of the network's ShoBox series and ShoExtreme series with veteran analyst Steve Farhood.

=== Dominican University ===
In 2013, he joined the faculty at Dominican University of California as a professor for the university's Communications Department.

He continues to do college football and basketball for Time-Warner Network and Comcast.

== Personal life ==
Tompkins' wife is Joan Ryan, a sports writer, and son is Ryan Tompkins.
