= David Nixon (American football) =

American football player (born 1985)

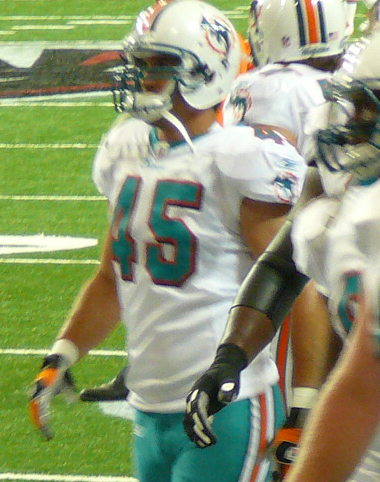
- Nixon with the Miami Dolphins in 2011

No. 56, 53, 51
- Position: Linebacker

Personal information
- Born: March 16, 1985 (age 41); College Station, Texas, U.S.
- Listed height: 6 ft 3 in (1.91 m)
- Listed weight: 240 lb (109 kg)

Career information
- High school: A&M Consolidated (College Station)
- College: BYU
- NFL draft: 2009: undrafted

Career history
- Oakland Raiders (2009); Houston Texans (2010); St. Louis Rams (2010); Miami Dolphins (2011)*; St. Louis Rams (2011); Carolina Panthers (2012)*
- * Offseason or practice squad member only

Awards and highlights
- Second-team All-MW (2008)

Career NFL statistics
- Total tackles: 16
- Forced fumbles: 1
- Stats at Pro Football Reference

David Nixon (born March 16, 1985) is an American former professional football player who was a linebacker in the National Football League (NFL). He signed with the Oakland Raiders as an undrafted free agent in 2009. He played college football for the BYU Cougars.

He also played for the Houston Texans and St. Louis Rams.

== College career ==
Nixon attended Brigham Young University and was an All-Mountain West Conference second-team selection his senior season. During his final season as a team captain Nixon set a new Mountain West Conference record with his 43 career tackles for loss and finished the season second on the team in tackles with 90. During his career with the Cougars Nixon tallied 275 tackles.

== Professional career ==
=== Oakland Raiders ===
Immediately following the draft Nixon signed as a rookie free agent with the Raiders. Following training camp Nixon was signed to the Raiders practice squad on September 6, 2009. On November 21, 2009, Nixon was promoted to the active roster and appeared in 3 regular season games. Nixon participated in the Raiders 2010 training camp but was placed on waivers on September 4, 2010.

=== Houston Texans ===
Nixon was claimed on waivers by the Texans and played 3 regular season games notching 10 tackles. The Texans waived Nixon on October 19, 2010.

=== St. Louis Rams ===
Nixon was signed to the Rams practice squad joining fellow BYU linebacker Bryan Kehl on the Rams roster. Nixon was signed to the Rams active roster on December 7, 2010. Nixon was waived on August 6, 2011.

=== Miami Dolphins ===
On August 9, 2011, Nixon signed with the Miami Dolphins. Nixon was cut during final cuts prior to the regular season.

=== St. Louis Rams ===
Nixon was re-signed by the Rams on November 9, 2011. He was released on March 12, 2012.

=== Carolina Panthers ===
Nixon signed with the Carolina Panthers on July 26, 2012, but was released during final cuts.

== Broadcasting ==
In October 2011, Nixon was signed by BYUtv Sports to serve as an analyst for pre-game and post-game shows on BYUtv. His first appearance doing such was the pre-game show for the game against Oregon State on October 15, 2011. Nixon also provided analysis during halftime for the BYUtv live broadcast of the Idaho State game on October 22, 2011. As BYUtv expanded its college football shows, Nixon was also added as a football analyst for After Further Review, and BYU Sports Nation.

== Personal life ==
Nixon is a member of the Church of Jesus Christ of Latter-day Saints. He served a mission for the Church in Ecuador and speaks fluent Spanish. Nixon's sister, Emily, married former BYU quarterback and New Orleans Saints tight end, Taysom Hill.
