= 2013–14 Pacific Tigers men's basketball team =

American college basketball season

2013–14 Pacific Tigers men's basketball

CIT Semifinals vs. Murray State, L 75–98
- Conference: West Coast Conference
- Record: 18–16 (6–12 WCC)
- Head coach: Ron Verlin (1st season)
- Assistant coaches: Adam Jacobsen; Calvin Byrd; Dwight Young
- Home arena: Alex G. Spanos Center

2013–14 West Coast Conference men's basketball standings
	Conf.				Overall
Team	W		L	PCT	W		L	PCT
Gonzaga †	15	–	3	.833	29	–	7	.806
BYU	13	–	5	.722	23	–	12	.657
San Francisco	13	–	5	.722	21	–	12	.636
Saint Mary's	11	–	7	.611	23	–	12	.657
Pepperdine	8	–	10	.444	15	–	16	.484
San Diego	7	–	11	.389	18	–	17	.514
Portland	7	–	11	.389	15	–	16	.484
Pacific	6	–	12	.333	18	–	16	.529
Santa Clara	6	–	12	.333	14	–	19	.424
Loyola Marymount	4	–	14	.222	13	–	19	.406
† Conference tournament winner

The 2013–14 Pacific Tigers men's basketball team represented the University of the Pacific during the 2013–14 NCAA Division I men's basketball season. They play their home games at the Alex G. Spanos Center. This was season of new beginnings for the Tigers. Gone after 25 seasons was long-time head coach Bob Thomason. The new head coach of the Tigers was former assistant Ron Verlin. Verlin arrived with much experience. Verlin had been the associate head coach for the Tigers for 19 seasons under Thomason. Verlin becomes the 20th head coach in the history of Tiger basketball.

In addition to the new coach, Pacific joined a new conference, the West Coast Conference. Pacific was one of the founders of what became the WCC. Now, after four decades, the Tigers returned allowing the WCC to return to a travel partner scenario. Pacific and Saint Mary's became travel partners. The other four sets of travel partners were San Francisco and Santa Clara, Loyola Marymount and Pepperdine, Gonzaga and Portland, and BYU and San Diego.

The Tigers finished the season 18–16, 6–12 in WCC play to finish in a tie for eighth place. They lost in the first round of the WCC tournament to Santa Clara. They were invited to the CollegeInsider.com Tournament where they defeated Grand Canyon, Texas A&M Corpus–Christi and fellow WCC member San Diego to advance to the semifinals where they lost to Murray State.

== Before the season ==
=== Departures ===
Name	Number	Pos.	Height	Weight	Year	Hometown	Notes
Colin Beatty	2	G	6'4"	205	Senior	Lanham, Maryland	Graduated
Reed Kamler	10	G	6'0"	185	Senior	San Rafael, California	Graduated
Lorenzo McCloud	11	G	6'0"	170	Senior	Los Angeles, California	Graduated
Rodrigo De Souza	21	G	6'2"	200	Senior	São Paulo, Brazil	Graduated
Markus Duran	22	G	6'0"	185	Senior	Murray, Utah	Graduated
Travis Fulton	24	F	6'6"	220	Senior	Corona, California	Graduated
Jordan Turner	25	F	6'5"	190	Senior	Oakland, California	Graduated

In addition to the 7 listed, Andrew Bock and Trevin Harris also graduated. However they both have one year of eligibility remaining and will return to the team for the 2013–14 season.

=== Recruiting ===
Currently two players have committed to join the Tigers for the 2013–14 season. More are expected to be announced, probably from the Junior College ranks.

College recruiting information
Name	Hometown	School	Height	Weight	Commit date
Raymond Boyles; G	Modesto, California	Modesto Christian	6 ft 5 in (1.96 m)	190 lb (86 kg)	Sep 15, 2012
Raymond Boyles; G	Recruit ratings: Scout: Rivals: (65)				
Thomas Wallace; G	Stockton, California	Ronald E. McNair	6 ft 3 in (1.91 m)	185 lb (84 kg)	Sep 10, 2012
Thomas Wallace; G	Recruit ratings: Scout: Rivals: (63)				
Overall recruit ranking: Scout: 98 Rivals: nr ESPN: nr
Note: In many cases, Scout, Rivals, 247Sports, On3, and ESPN may conflict in their listings of height and weight.; In these cases, the average was taken. ESPN grades are on a 100-point scale.; Sources: "Pacific 2013 Basketball Commitments". Rivals.; "2013 Pacific Basketball Commits". Scout.; "ESPN". ESPN.; "Scout.com Team Recruiting Rankings". Scout.; "2013 Team Ranking". Rivals.

== Roster ==
2013–14 Pacific Tigers men's basketball team
Players
Coaches

Pos.	#	Name	Height	Weight	Year	Previous school	Hometown
F	1	Trevin Harris	6 ft 5 in (1.96 m)	215 lb (98 kg)	Sr	Kingwood; Western Wyoming CC	Kingwood, TX
G	2	T.J. Wallace	6 ft 2 in (1.88 m)	205 lb (93 kg)	Fr	Modesto Christian	Stockton, CA
G	3	Sama Taku	6 ft 2 in (1.88 m)	185 lb (84 kg)	Sr	Tucson; Santa Rosa JC	Tucson, AZ
G	4	Aaron Hendricks	6 ft 0 in (1.83 m)	185 lb (84 kg)	Fr	New Hampton School	Loomis, CA
G	5	Spencer Llewellyn	6 ft 3 in (1.91 m)	200 lb (91 kg)	Jr	Sydney Boys	Sydney, Australia
F	11	Gabriel Aguirre	6 ft 9 in (2.06 m)	240 lb (109 kg)	Jr	City College of San Francisco	São Paulo, Brazil
G	12	Andrew Bock	6 ft 2 in (1.88 m)	175 lb (79 kg)	Sr	Eisenhower; Creighton	Rialto, CA
F	13	Khalil Kelley	6 ft 8 in (2.03 m)	225 lb (102 kg)	Sr	Los Osos	Rancho Cucamonga, CA
F	15	Aaron Short	6 ft 3 in (1.91 m)	215 lb (98 kg)	Jr	North Valley; Cabrillo College	Reno, NV
G	20	Ross Rivera	6 ft 7 in (2.01 m)	225 lb (102 kg)	Sr	El Diamante; College of the Sequoias	Visalia, CA
G	22	Ray Bowles	6 ft 5 in (1.96 m)	190 lb (86 kg)	Fr	Modesto Christian	Modesto, CA
F	24	David Taylor	6 ft 3 in (1.91 m)	180 lb (82 kg)	Fr	Graf-Münster-Gymnasium	Eckersdorf, Germany
F	30	Thomas Peters	6 ft 6 in (1.98 m)	200 lb (91 kg)	Fr	Archbishop Mitty	Campbell, CA
F	33	Tony Gill	6 ft 8 in (2.03 m)	220 lb (100 kg)	Sr	Oakmont; Cosumnes River College	Roseville, CA
C	42	Tim Thomas	6 ft 10 in (2.08 m)	255 lb (116 kg)	Sr	Sheridan; Las Positas College	Sheridan, WY

Head coach

- Ron Verlin (Sacramento State)

Assistant coach(es)

- Adam Jacobsen (Pacific)
- Calvin Byrd (Villanova)
- TBA

Legend

- (C) Team captain
- (S) Suspended
- (I) Ineligible
- (W) Walk-on
- Injured
- Current redshirt

== Schedule ==
Pacific basketball will see an increased amount of television exposure for the 2013–14 season. Every conference game is guaranteed to be on an ESPN Network, WCC TV, WCC Network, or a local TV station (Comcast, ROOT, Time Warner, FSSD, or BYUtv). Untelevised non-conference home games will likely be switch from Big West TV to Stretch Internet.

Date time, TV	Opponent	Result	Record	Site city, state
Exhibition
10/30/2013*; 7:00 pm, Tigers TV	Cal State Stanislaus	W 80–70		Alex G. Spanos Center; Stockton, CA
11/03/2013*; 4:00 pm, Tigers TV	Montana Tech	W 76–52		Alex G. Spanos Center; Stockton, CA
Regular season
11/08/2013*; 7:05 pm, MW Network	at Nevada	W 80–78	1–0	Lawlor Events Center; Reno, NV
11/12/2013*; 7:00 pm, Tigers TV	UC Irvine	W 84–79	2–0	Alex G. Spanos Center; Stockton, CA
11/17/2013*; 2:00 pm, Tigers TV	Western Illinois	W 66–52	3–0	Alex G. Spanos Center; Stockton, CA
11/23/2013*; 7:30 pm, Tigers TV	Fresno State	W 86–77	4–0	Alex G. Spanos Center; Stockton, CA
11/29/2013*; 12:00 pm, P12N	at No. 14 Oregon; Global Sports Hardwood Classic	L 62–85	4–1	Matthew Knight Arena; Eugene, OR
11/30/2013*; 1:00 pm	vs. Cal Poly; Global Sports Hardwood Classic	W 73–71	5–1	Matthew Knight Arena; Eugene, OR
12/01/2013*; 4:30 pm	vs. North Dakota; Global Sports Hardwood Classic	W 93–76	6–1	Matthew Knight Arena; Eugene, OR
12/07/2013*; 4:00 pm, MW Network	at Utah State	W 78–68	7–1	Smith Spectrum; Logan, UT
12/14/2013*; 7:00 pm, Tigers TV	Menlo College	W 84–73	8–1	Alex G. Spanos Center; Stockton, CA
12/20/2013*; 7:30 pm, Holiday Hoops TV	vs. Princeton; South Point Holiday Hoops Classic	L 58–83	8–2	South Point Arena; Enterprise, NV
12/21/2013*; 5:30 pm, Holiday Hoops TV	vs. Bradley; South Point Holiday Hoops Classic	W 71–55	9–2	South Point Arena; Enterprise, NV
12/30/2013; 8:00 pm, CSNCA	Saint Mary's	L 80–88	9–3 (0–1)	Alex G. Spanos Center; Stockton, CA
01/02/2014; 7:00 pm, TheW.tv	at Portland	L 64–72	9–4 (0–2)	Chiles Center; Portland, OR
01/04/2014; 5:00 pm, TheW.tv	at No. 24 Gonzaga	L 64–86	9–5 (0–3)	McCarthey Athletic Center; Spokane, WA
01/09/2014; 7:00 pm, TheW.tv	San Francisco	L 72–81 ^{OT}	9–6 (0–4)	Alex G. Spanos Center; Stockton, CA
01/11/2014; 1:00 pm, TWCSN/CSNCA	Santa Clara	W 80–68	10–6 (1–4)	Alex G. Spanos Center; Stockton, CA
01/18/2014; 5:00 pm, TheW.tv	at Saint Mary's	L 73–79	10–7 (1–5)	McKeon Pavilion; Moraga, CA
01/23/2014; 7:00 pm, TheW.tv	Loyola Marymount	L 81–92	10–8 (1–6)	Alex G. Spanos Center; Stockton, CA
01/25/2014; 7:00 pm, TheW.tv	Pepperdine	W 76–66	11–8 (2–6)	Alex G. Spanos Center; Stockton, CA
01/30/2014; 6:00 pm, BYUtv	at BYU	L 78–88	11–9 (2–7)	Marriott Center; Provo, UT
02/01/2014; 1:00 pm, TWCSN/CSNCA	at San Diego	W 84–67	12–9 (3–7)	Jenny Craig Pavilion; San Diego, CA
02/06/2014; 7:00 pm, TheW.tv	at Pepperdine	L 69–80	12–10 (3–8)	Firestone Fieldhouse; Malibu, CA
02/08/2014; 7:00 pm, TheW.tv	at Loyola Marymount	W 82–72	13–10 (4–8)	Gersten Pavilion; Los Angeles, CA
02/13/2014; 8:00 pm, TWCSN/CSNCA	BYU	W 89–82	14–10 (5–8)	Alex G. Spanos Center; Stockton, CA
02/15/2014; 7:00 pm, CSN CA	San Diego	L 55–70	14–11 (5–9)	Alex G. Spanos Center; Stockton, CA
02/20/2014; 7:00 pm, TheW.tv	at Santa Clara	L 50–70	14–12 (5–10)	Leavey Center; Santa Clara, CA
02/22/2014; 3:00 pm, TWCSN/CSNCA	at San Francisco	L 59-64	14–13 (5–11)	War Memorial Gymnasium; San Francisco, CA
02/27/2014; 7:00 pm, ESPNU	Gonzaga	L 53–70	14–14 (5–12)	Alex G. Spanos Center; Stockton, CA
03/01/2014; 3:00 pm, TheW.tv	Portland	W 68–65	15–14 (6–12)	Alex G. Spanos Center; Stockton, CA
WCC tournament
03/06/2014; 8:30 pm, BYUtv	vs. Santa Clara; First round	L 64–81	15–15	Orleans Arena; Paradise, NV
CIT
03/19/2014*; 8:00 pm, Cox7	at Grand Canyon; First round	W 69–67	16–15	Antelope Gymnasium; Phoenix, AZ
03/22/2014*; 6:00 pm	Texas A&M–Corpus Christi; Second round	W 89–60	17–15	Alex G. Spanos Center; Stockton, CA
03/26/2014*; 7:00 pm	San Diego; Quarterfinals	W 75–60	18–15	Alex G. Spanos Center; Stockton, CA
04/01/2014*; 6:00 pm, CBSSN	at Murray State; Semifinals	L 75–98	18–16	CFSB Center; Murray, KY
*Non-conference game. ^{#}Rankings from AP Poll. (#) Tournament seedings in parentheses. All times are in Pacific Time.

== Game summaries ==
=== Exhibition: Cal State Stanislaus ===
Broadcaster: Zach Bayrouty

Tigers TV

Oct 30
7:05 pm PDT

Recap

Cal State Stanislaus Warriors 70, Pacific Tigers 80
Scoring by half: 34-47, 36-33
Pts: Tyler Barber 15; Rebs: Rob Walters 10; Asts: Sam Marcus 10	Pts: Sama Taku 25; Rebs: Khalil Kelley & Ross Rivera 8 Asts: Andrew Bock 6

Alex G. Spanos Center
Stockton, CA
Attendance: 1,861
Referees: Tony Padilla, Coban Lopez, Sam haddad

=== Exhibition: Montana Tech ===
Broadcaster: Zach Bayrouty

Tigers TV

Nov 3
4:05 pm PST

Recap

Montana Tech Diggers 52, Pacific Tigers 76
Scoring by half: 21-39, 31-37
Pts: Travis Peevey 14; Rebs: Bryan Bock 7 Asts: Roman Pruenda-Garza 4	Pts: Tony Gill 19; Rebs: Tony Gill 8 Asts: Andrew Bock 6

Alex G. Spanos Center
Stockton, CA
Attendance: 1,653
Referees: Mike Reed, Ken Ditty, Dennis Flannery

=== Nevada ===
Series History: Pacific leads 53-44
Broadcaster: Ryan Radtke

MW Net

Nov 8
7:05 pm PST

Pacific Tigers 80, Nevada Wolf Pack 78
Scoring by half: 37-42, 43-36
Pts: Tony Gill 22; Rebs: Khalil Kelley 6 Asts: Andrew Bock 3	Pts: Deonte Burton 23; Rebs: Jerry Evans, Jr. 9 Asts: Deonte Burton 3

Lawlor Events Center
Reno, NV
Attendance: 5,936
Referees: Ruben Ramos, Glen Mayberry, Deldre Carr

=== UC Irvine ===
Series History: Pacific leads 42-37
Broadcaster: Zach Bayrouty

Tigers TV

Nov 12
7:05 pm PST

Recap

UC Irvine Anteaters 79, Pacific Tigers 84
Scoring by half: 39-43, 40-41
Pts: Alex Young 17; Rebs: Mamadou Ndiaye 6 Asts: Alex Young 4	Pts: Ross Rivera 21; Rebs: Sama Taku & Ross Rivera 8 Asts: Sama Taku 4

Alex G. Spanos Center
Stockton, CA
Attendance: 1,862
Referees: Horace Shields, Marc Beasley, Casey McClellan

=== Western Illinois ===
Series History: Pacific leads 1-0
Broadcaster: Zach Bayrouty

Tigers TV

Nov 17
2:05 pm PST

Recap

Western Illinois Leathernecks 52, Pacific Tigers 66
Scoring by half: 23-44, 29-22
Pts: Garret Covington 16; Rebs: Michael Ochereobia 8 Asts: Remy Roberts-Burnett 4	Pts: Tony Gill 19; Rebs: Sama Taku 6 Asts: Trevin Harris & Sama Taku 4

Alex G. Spanos Center
Stockton, CA
Attendance: 1,771
Referees: Deldre Carr, Kurt Walker, Sam Haddad

=== Fresno State ===
Series History: Pacific leads 78-77
Broadcaster: Zach Bayrouty

Tigers TV

Nov 23
7:05 pm PST

Recap

Fresno State Bulldogs 77, Pacific Tigers 86
Scoring by half: 26-27, 51-59
Pts: Tyler Johnson 25; Rebs: Tyler Johnson & Alex Davis 6 Asts: Tyler Johnson, Cezar Guerrero, & Allen Huddleston 3	Pts: Andrew Bock 19; Rebs: Khalil Kelley 12; Asts: Sama Taku 6

Alex G. Spanos Center
Stockton, CA
Attendance: 3,204
Referees: Michael Greenstein, Tommy Nunez, Donald McAllister

=== Global Sports Classic: Oregon ===
Series History: Oregon leads 6-2
Broadcasters: Aaron Goldsmith and Ernie Kent

P12N

Nov 29
12:06 pm PST

Recap

Pacific Tigers 62, Oregon Ducks 85
Scoring by half: 36-29, 26-56
Pts: Trevin Harris & T.J. Wallace 14; Rebs: Tim Thomas 6 Asts: Trevin Harris 3	Pts: Mike Moser 19; Rebs: Damyean Dotson 7 Asts: Johnathan Loyd 13

Matthew Knight Arena
Eugene, OR
Attendance: N/A
Referees: Bob Staffen, Michael Greenstein, Martin Cota

=== Global Sports Classic: Cal Poly ===
Series History: Pacific leads 34-14

Nov 30
12:30 pm PST

Recap

Cal Poly Mustangs 71, Pacific Tigers 73
Scoring by half: 28-36, 43-47
Pts: Chris Eversley 22; Rebs: Chris Eversley 10; Asts: Jamal Johnson 4	Pts: Tony Gill 14; Rebs: Sama Taku 7 Asts: Trevin Harris & Sama Taku 3

Matthew Knight Arena
Eugene, OR
Attendance: 5,937
Referees: Bob Staffen, Shawn Lehigh, Martin Cota

=== Global Sports Classic: North Dakota ===
Series History: Series tied 1-1

Dec 1
4:30 pm PST

Recap

Pacific Tigers 93, North Dakota 76
Scoring by half: 45-48, 48-28
Pts: Ross Rivera 19; Rebs: Tony Gill 8 Asts: Andrew Bock & T.J. Wallace 3	Pts: Troy Huff 21; Rebs: Troy Huff 8 Asts: Aaron Anderson & Troy Huff 3

Matthew Knight Arena
Eugene, OR
Attendance: N/A
Referees: Michael Greenstein, Shawn Lehigh, Martin Cota

=== Utah State ===
Series History: Utah State leads 44-23
Broadcasters: Evan Nyman and Rod Tueller

MW Net

Dec 7
5:00 pm MST

Recap

Pacific Tigers 78, Utah State Aggies 68
Scoring by half: 37-29, 41-39
Pts: Andrew Bock 18; Rebs: Tony Gill 7 Asts: T.J. Wallace 4	Pts: Jarred Shaw 17; Rebs: Spencer Butterfield 8 Asts: Marcel Davis & Preston Medlin 4

Dee Glen Smith Spectrum
Logan, UT
Attendance: 9,558
Referees: Dick Cartmell, Duane Allen, Kevin Brill

=== Menlo College ===
Tigers TV

Dec 14
7:05 pm PST

Recap

Menlo College Oaks 73, Pacific Tigers 84
Scoring by half: 37-44, 36-40
Pts: John Smith 24; Rebs: John Smith 5 Asts: Keith Bowman 3	Pts: Khalil Kelley 27; Rebs: Khalil Kelley 11; Asts: Trevin Harris & Andrew Bock 3

Alex G. Spanos Center
Stockton, CA
Attendance: 1,837
Referees: James Giron, Dennis Flannery, Mark Cook

=== South Point Holiday Classic: Princeton ===
Series History: First Meeting

Holiday Hoops TV

Dec 20
7:30 pm PST

Recap

Pacific Tigers 58, Princeton Tigers 83
Scoring by half: 30-45, 28-38
Pts: Sama Taku 12; Rebs: Khalil Kelley 8 Asts: Aaron Short 1	Pts: T.J. Bray 20; Rebs: Will Barrett 5 Asts: T.J. Bray 8

South Point Arena
Enterprise, NV
Attendance: N/A
Referees: Todd Austin, Daryl Smith, Marty Kerrigan

=== South Point Holiday Classic: Bradley ===
Series History: Bradley leads 1-0

Holiday Hoops TV

Dec 21
5:45 pm PST

Recap

Bradley Braves 55, Pacific Tigers 71
Scoring by half: 27-35, 28-36
Pts: Omari Grier 15; Rebs: Tyshon Pickett 9 Asts: Ka'Darryl Bell & Walt Lemon Jr. 3	Pts: T.J. Wallace 14; Rebs: Khalil Kelley & Gabriel Aguirre 6 Asts: Andrew Bock 7

South Point Arena
Enterprise, NV
Attendance: 312
Referees: Landon Brandes, Todd Austin, Marty Kerrigan

=== Saint Mary's ===
Series History: Saint Mary's leads 66-43
Broadcasters: Barry Tompkins and Dan Belluomini

CSNCA

Dec 30
8:00 pm PST

Recap

Saint Mary's Gaels 88, Pacific Tigers 80
Scoring by half: 45-39, 43-41
Pts: Beau Levesque 18; Rebs: Brad Waldow & Beau Levesque 8 Asts: Stephen Holt 8	Pts: Andrew Bock 23; Rebs: Tony Gill 12; Asts: Trevin Harris 2

Alex G. Spanos Center
Stockton, CA
Attendance: 4,015
Referees: Michael Irving, Glen Mayberry, Tony Padilla

=== Portland ===
Series History: Pacific leads 20-8
Broadcasters: Tom Glasgow & Bill Krueger

TheW.tv

Jan 2
7:00 pm PST

Recap

Pacific Tigers 64, Portland Pilots 72
Scoring by half: 28-35, 36-37
Pts: Sama Taku 19; Rebs: Trevin Harris & Tony Gill 9 Asts: T.J. Wallace 5	Pts: Thomas Van Der Mars 18; Rebs: Thomas Van Der Mars 13; Asts: Alec Wintering 5

Chiles Center
Portland, OR
Attendance: 1,173
Referees: Deron White, Daryl Gelinas, Brett Nansel

=== Gonzaga ===
Series History: Gonzaga leads series 3-1
Broadcasters: Greg Hesiter and Richard Fox

TheW.tv

Jan 4
5:00 pm PST

Pacific Tigers 64, Gonzaga Bulldogs 86
Scoring by half: 25-46, 39-40
Pts: David Taylor 11; Rebs: TJ Wallace 6 Asts: Trevin Harris, Sama Taku, TJ Wallace, & Aaron Short 2	Pts: Kevin Pangos & Drew Barham 16; Rebs: Przemek Karnowski 8 Asts: Kyle Dranginis 7

McCarthey Athletic Center
Spokane, WA
Attendance: 6,000
Referees: Kevin Brill, Marc Beasley, Bruce Hicks

=== San Francisco ===
Series History: San Francisco leads 60-34
Broadcasters: Rich Cellini & John Stege

TheW.tv

Jan 9
7:00 pm PST

Recap

San Francisco Dons 81, Pacific Tigers 72 (OT)
Scoring by half: 30-36, 33-27 Overtime: 18-9
Pts: Avry Holmes 18; Rebs: Matt Glover 9 Asts: Avry Holmes 8	Pts: Andrew Bock 17; Rebs: Sama Taku, Tony Gill, & Aaron Short 7 Asts: Andrew Bock 4

Alex G. Spanos Center
Stockton, CA
Attendance: 1,448
Referees: Tommy Nunez, Kurt Walker, Coban Lopez

=== Santa Clara ===
Series History: Santa Clara leads 89-41
Broadcasters: Barry Tompkins and Jarron Collins

CSNCA

Jan 11
1:05 pm PST

Recap

Santa Clara Broncos 68, Pacific Tigers 80
Scoring by half: 29-33, 39-47
Pts: Brandon Clark 20; Rebs: John McArthur 6 Asts: Brandon Clark 4	Pts: Sama Taku 19; Rebs: Tony Gill 7 Asts: Sama Taku 4

Alex G. Spanos Center
Stockton, CA
Attendance: 1,816
Referees: Scott Brown, Rob Rorke, Nate Harris
