= 2013–14 West Coast Conference men's basketball season =

- League: NCAA Division I
- Sport: Basketball
- Teams: 10
- TV partner(s): National: ESPN2, ESPNU, BYUtv, TheW.tv; Regional: FSSD, CSNNW, CSNBA, CSNCA, ROOT NW, ROOT RM, TWCSN

Regular season
- Season champions: Gonzaga
- Runners-up: BYU
- Season MVP: Tyler Haws, BYU
- Top scorer: Tyler Haws, BYU

Tournament
- Champions: Gonzaga
- Runners-up: BYU
- Finals MVP: Sam Dower, Jr., Gonzaga

Basketball seasons
- ← 12–13 14–15 →

2013–14 West Coast Conference men's basketball standings
	Conf.				Overall
Team	W		L	PCT	W		L	PCT
Gonzaga †	15	–	3	.833	29	–	7	.806
BYU	13	–	5	.722	23	–	12	.657
San Francisco	13	–	5	.722	21	–	12	.636
Saint Mary's	11	–	7	.611	23	–	12	.657
Pepperdine	8	–	10	.444	15	–	16	.484
San Diego	7	–	11	.389	18	–	17	.514
Portland	7	–	11	.389	15	–	16	.484
Pacific	6	–	12	.333	18	–	16	.529
Santa Clara	6	–	12	.333	14	–	19	.424
Loyola Marymount	4	–	14	.222	13	–	19	.406
† Conference tournament winner

The 2013–14 West Coast Conference men's basketball season began with practices in October 2013 and ended with the 2014 West Coast Conference men's basketball tournament at the Orleans Arena March 6–11, 2014 in Las Vegas. The regular season began in November, with the conference schedule starting at the end of December.

This was the 63rd season for the conference, and the 25th under its current name as "West Coast Conference". The conference began as the California Basketball Association in 1952, became the West Coast Athletic Conference in 1956, and dropped the word "Athletic" in 1989. The conference went through significant changes this season, adding a new member for the second time in three seasons and bringing the WCC to 10 members. Original conference founder, and a fellow faith-based, private school Pacific, rejoined the conference from the Big West.

== Pre-season ==
- Pre-season media day took place on Thursday, October 24 at the Time Warner Cable SportsNet and Time Warner Cable Deportes Studios. Video interviews were hosted on the WCC's streaming video outler, TheW.tv, beginning at 11:30 AM PDT. Jeff Lampe of WCC Live also interviewed each coach and get a preview of their respective season. The regional television schedule announcement, the Preseason All-Conference team, and the pre-season coaches' rankings were some of the additional events that took place.

=== 2013–14 West Coast Men's Basketball Media Poll ===
Rank, School (first-place votes), Points
1. Gonzaga (8), 80
2. BYU (1), 72
3. St. Mary's (1), 66
4. San Francisco, 51
5. San Diego, 50
6. Loyola Marymount, 44
7. Pacific, 28
8. Santa Clara, 25
9. Portland, 24
10. Pepperdine, 10

=== 2013–14 WCC Men's Preseason All-Conference Team ===
Player, School, Yr., Pos.
Gary Bell, Gonzaga, Jr., G
Stacy Davis, Pepperdine, So., F
Johnny Dee, San Diego, Jr., G
Cole Dickerson, San Francisco, Sr., F
Cody Doolin, San Francisco, Sr., G
Tyler Haws, BYU, Jr., G
Stephen Holt, Saint Mary's, Sr., G
Anthony Ireland, Loyola Marymount, Sr., G
Kevin Pangos, Gonzaga, Jr., G
Brad Waldow, Saint Mary's, Jr., F

== Rankings ==
Legend
	Improvement in ranking
	Drop in ranking
RV	Received votes but were not ranked in Top 25 of poll

		Pre/ Wk 1	Wk 2	Wk 3	Wk 4	Wk 5	Wk 6	Wk 7	Wk 8	Wk 9	Wk 10	Wk 11	Wk 12	Wk 13	Wk 14	Wk 15	Wk 16	Wk 17	Wk 18	Wk 19	Final
BYU	AP		RV	RV																	
BYU	C		RV	RV																	
Gonzaga	AP	15	15	13	11	19	20	21	24	24	22	RV	RV	RV	23	RV	25	RV			
Gonzaga	C	14	15	12	10	15	16	15	21	21	18	24	21	24	20	24	22	RV			
Loyola Marymount	AP																				
Loyola Marymount	C																				
Pacific	AP																				
Pacific	C																				
Pepperdine	AP																				
Pepperdine	C																				
Portland	AP																				
Portland	C																				
Saint Mary's	AP					RV	RV	RV	RV												
Saint Mary's	C		RV	RV	RV	RV	RV	RV	RV												
San Diego	AP																				
San Diego	C																				
San Francisco	AP																				
San Francisco	C																				
Santa Clara	AP																				
Santa Clara	C																				

== Non-Conference games ==
- BYU defeated Texas in the semifinals of the CBE Classic. In the month of January, Texas would go on to defeat 4 consecutive top-25 opponents, giving BYU a win over a Top 25 RPI school.
- BYU defeated Stanford as part of the ESPN College Tip-Off. Stanford would finish the year as a Top 50 RPI school, giving BYU a 2nd win over a power conference Top 50 RPI school.

== Conference games ==
=== Composite Matrix ===
This table summarizes the head-to-head results between teams in conference play. (x) indicates games remaining this season.

	BYU	Gonzaga	LMU	Pacific	Pepperdine	Portland	Saint Mary's	San Diego	San Francisco	Santa Clara
vs. Brigham Young	-	1-1	1–1	1–1	1–1	1–1	0–2	0–2	0-2	0-2
vs. Gonzaga	1–1	-	0–2	0–2	0–2	1–1	0–2	1–1	0–2	0-2
vs. Loyola Marymount	1–1	2–0	-	1–1	2–0	2–0	2–0	1–1	2–0	1-1
vs. Pacific	1–1	2–0	1–1	-	1–1	1–1	2–0	1–1	2–0	1-1
vs. Pepperdine	1–1	2–0	0–2	1–1	-	1–1	2–0	0–2	2–0	1-1
vs. Portland	1–1	1–1	0–2	1–1	1–1	-	2–0	2–0	2–0	1-1
vs. Saint Mary's	2–0	2–0	0–2	0–2	0–2	0–2	-	1–1	1–1	1-1
vs. San Diego	2–0	1–1	1–1	1–1	2–0	0–2	1–1	-	2–0	1-1
vs. San Francisco	2–0	2–0	0–2	0–2	0–2	0–2	1–1	0–2	-	0-2
vs. Santa Clara	2–0	2–0	1–1	1–1	1–1	1–1	1–1	1–1	2-0	-
Total	13–5	15–3	4–14	6–12	8–10	7–11	11–7	7–11	13–5	6-12

== Conference tournament ==
- March 6–11, 2014– West Coast Conference Basketball Tournament, Orleans Arena, Las Vegas, NV.

First round Thursday, March 6
8	Pacific	64
9	Santa Clara	81
7	Portland	64
10	Loyola Marymount	67

Quarterfinals; Saturday, March 8
1	Gonzaga	77
9	Santa Clara	75
4	Saint Mary's	80
5	Pepperdine	69
3	San Francisco	69
6	San Diego	60
2	BYU	85
10	Loyola Marymount	74

Semifinals; Monday, March 10
1	Gonzaga	70
4	Saint Mary's	54
2	BYU	79^{OT}
3	San Francisco	77

Championship; Tuesday, March 11
1	Gonzaga	75
2	BYU	64

== Head coaches ==
Dave Rose, BYU
Mark Few, Gonzaga
Max Good, Loyola Marymount
Ron Verlin, Pacific
Marty Wilson, Pepperdine
Eric Reveno, Portland
Randy Bennett, Saint Mary's
Bill Grier, San Diego
Rex Walters, San Francisco
Kerry Keating, Santa Clara

== Postseason ==
=== NCAA tournament ===
Seed	Bracket	School	First round	Second round	Third round	Sweet 16	Elite 8	Final Four	Championship

=== NIT ===
Seed	Bracket	School	First round	Second round	Quarterfinals	Semifinals	Finals

=== CBI ===
School	First round	Quarterfinals	Semifinals	Finals Game 1	Finals Game 2	Finals Game 3

== Highlights and notes ==
- The Highlights and notes will be posted as the season progresses.

== Awards and honors ==
=== WCC Player-of-the-Week ===
- Nov. 11- Tony Gill, F, Pacific
- Nov. 25 – Kevin Pangos, G, Gonzaga
- Dec. 9 – Thomas van der Mars, C, Portland
- Dec. 23 – Bryce Pressley, G, Portland
- Jan. 6 – Skyler Halford, G, BYU
- Jan. 20 – Sam Dower, Jr., C, Gonzaga
- Feb. 3 – Tyler Haws, G, BYU
- Feb. 17 – Kruize Pinkins, F, San Francisco
- Mar. 3 –
- Nov. 18 – Stacy Davis, F, Pepperdine
- Dec. 2 – Kevin Pangos, G, Gonzaga
- Dec. 16 – Stephen Holt, G, Saint Mary's
- Dec. 30 – Malcolm Brooks, G, Pepperdine
- Jan. 13 – Tyler Haws, G, BYU
- Jan. 27 – Johnny Dee, G, San Diego
- Feb. 10 – Stephen Holt, G, Saint Mary's
- Feb. 24 - Matt Carlino, G, BYU

=== College Madness West Coast Player of the Week ===
- Nov. 10 - Tony Gill, F, Pacific
- Nov. 24 – Kevin Pangos, G, Gonzaga
- Dec. 8 – T. J. Wallace, G, Pacific
- Dec. 22 – Bryce Pressley, G, Portland
- Jan. 5 – Brendan Lane, F, Pepperdine
- Jan. 19 – Sam Dower, Jr., C, Gonzaga
- Feb. 2 – Tyler Haws, G, BYU (also High-Major Madness Player of the Week)
- Feb. 16 – Kruize Pinkins, F, San Francisco
- Mar. 2 –
- Nov. 17 – Kyle Collinsworth, G, BYU
- Dec. 1 – Kevin Bailey, G, Portland
- Dec. 15 – Stephen Holt, G, Saint Mary's
- Dec. 29 – Evan Payne, G, Loyola Marymount
- Jan. 12 – Bryce Pressley, G, Portland
- Jan. 26 – Tyler Haws, G, BYU
- Feb. 9 – Beau Levesque, F, Saint Mary's
- Feb. 23 - Matt Carlino, G, BYU

=== All West Coast Conference teams ===
The voting body for all conference awards consisted of league coaches.

- Player of the Year: Tyler Haws, BYU
- Defensive Player of the Year: Brendan Lane, Pepperdine
- Newcomer of the Year: Jared Brownridge, Santa Clara
- Coach of the Year: Rex Walters, San Francisco

=== All-Conference ===
Player	School	Year	Position
Kyle Collinsworth	BYU	Sophomore	G
Stacy Davis	Pepperdine	Sophomore	F
Johnny Dee	San Diego	Junior	G
Cole Dickerson	San Francisco	Senior	F
Sam Dower	Gonzaga	Senior	F
Tyler Haws	BYU	Junior	G
Stephen Holt	Saint May's	Senior	G
Anthony Ireland	Loyola Marymount	Senior	G
Kevin Pangos	Gonzaga	Junior	G
Brad Waldow	Saint Mary's	Junior	C

=== Honorable Mention ===
Name	School

=== All-Freshman ===
Player	School	Position

=== All-Academic ===
Player	School	Year	GPA	Major

== See also ==
- 2013-14 NCAA Division I men's basketball season
- West Coast Conference men's basketball tournament
- 2013–14 West Coast Conference women's basketball season
- West Coast Conference women's basketball tournament
- 2014 West Coast Conference women's basketball tournament
