= 2013–14 San Francisco Dons men's basketball team =

American college basketball season

2013–14 San Francisco Dons men's basketball
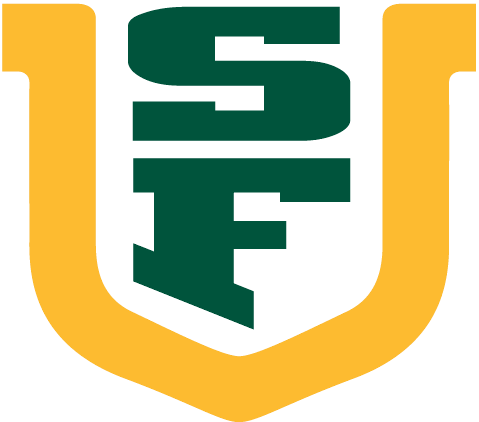

NIT First round vs. LSU, L 63–71
- Conference: West Coast Conference
- Record: 21–12 (13–5 WCC)
- Head coach: Rex Walters (6th season)
- Assistant coaches: Luke Wicks; Brent Crews; David Rebibo
- Home arena: War Memorial Gymnasium

2013–14 West Coast Conference men's basketball standings
	Conf.				Overall
Team	W		L	PCT	W		L	PCT
Gonzaga †	15	–	3	.833	29	–	7	.806
BYU	13	–	5	.722	23	–	12	.657
San Francisco	13	–	5	.722	21	–	12	.636
Saint Mary's	11	–	7	.611	23	–	12	.657
Pepperdine	8	–	10	.444	15	–	16	.484
San Diego	7	–	11	.389	18	–	17	.514
Portland	7	–	11	.389	15	–	16	.484
Pacific	6	–	12	.333	18	–	16	.529
Santa Clara	6	–	12	.333	14	–	19	.424
Loyola Marymount	4	–	14	.222	13	–	19	.406
† Conference tournament winner

The 2013–14 San Francisco Dons men's basketball team represented the University of San Francisco during the 2013–14 college basketball season. It was head coach Rex Walters sixth season at San Francisco. The Dons played their home games at the War Memorial Gymnasium and were members of the West Coast Conference. They finished the season 21–12, 13–5 in WCC play to finish in a tie for second place. They advanced to the semifinals of the WCC tournament where they lost to BYU. They were invited to the National Invitation Tournament where they lost in the first round to LSU.

== Before the season ==
=== Departures ===
Name	Number	Pos.	Height	Weight	Year	Hometown	Notes
Dominique O'Connor	0	G	5'10"	165	Senior	Los Angeles, CA	Retired from basketball due to multiple knee injuries
Joe Edmonds	13	G	6'5"	195	Freshman	Oklahoma City, OK	Transferred
De'End Parker	21	G	6'6"	215	Junior	San Francisco, CA	Dismissed for conduct detrimental to the program
Frank Rogers	31	F	6'9"	210	Sophomore	Salinas, CA	Transferred

=== Recruits ===
College recruiting (2013)
Name	Hometown	School	Height	Weight	Commit date
Kruize Pinkins; F	Marianna, FL	Marianna; Chipola JC	6 ft 6 in (1.98 m)	215 lb (98 kg)	Apr 7, 2013
Kruize Pinkins; F	Recruit ratings: Scout: Rivals: (JC)				
Corey Hilliard; G	Kansas City, MO	Raytown South; Nebraska; Midland	6 ft 3 in (1.91 m)	185 lb (84 kg)	Apr 22, 2013
Corey Hilliard; G	Recruit ratings: Scout: Rivals: (JC)				
Overall recruit ranking: Scout: nr Rivals: nr ESPN: nr
Note: In many cases, Scout, Rivals, 247Sports, On3, and ESPN may conflict in their listings of height and weight.; In these cases, the average was taken. ESPN grades are on a 100-point scale.; Sources: "San Francisco Dons 2013 Basketball Commitments". Rivals.; "2013 San Francisco Dons Basketball Commits". Scout.; "ESPN". ESPN.; "Scout.com Team Recruiting Rankings". Scout.; "2013 Team Ranking". Rivals.

== Roster ==
2013–14 San Francisco Dons men's basketball team
Players
Coaches

Pos.	#	Name	Height	Weight	Year	Previous school	Hometown
G	1	Corey Hilliard	6 ft 1 in (1.85 m)	185 lb (84 kg)	Jr	Raytown South; Nebraska; Midland College	Kansas City, MO
F	2	Uche Ofoegbu (redshirt)	6 ft 4 in (1.93 m)	214 lb (97 kg)	So	John Paul Stevens; SMU	San Antonio, TX
F	3	Matt Christiansen	6 ft 9 in (2.06 m)	235 lb (107 kg)	So	Bishop McGuiness	Oklahoma City, OK
G	5	Matt Glover	6 ft 5 in (1.96 m)	212 lb (96 kg)	RS Jr	Tustin	Orange, CA
G	10	Chris Adams	6 ft 4 in (1.93 m)	194 lb (88 kg)	Jr	Damien	Covina, CA
G	11	Gavin Hoffmann	6 ft 5 in (1.96 m)	204 lb (93 kg)	Jr	Lincoln	Portland, OR
G	12	Avry Holmes	6 ft 2 in (1.88 m)	196 lb (89 kg)	So	North Salem	Salem, OR
F	15	Kruize Pinkins	6 ft 7 in (2.01 m)	230 lb (104 kg)	Jr	Marianna; Chipola College	Marianna, FL
F	23	Mark Tollefsen	6 ft 9 in (2.06 m)	199 lb (90 kg)	RS So	San Ramon Valley	Danville, CA
F	25	Cole Dickerson	6 ft 7 in (2.01 m)	227 lb (103 kg)	Sr	Federal Way	Federal Way, WA
G	32	Tim Derksen	6 ft 3 in (1.91 m)	202 lb (92 kg)	So	Amphitheater	Tucson, AZ
C	33	Darrell Robertson (redshirt)	6 ft 10 in (2.08 m)	242 lb (110 kg)	Jr	Mendenhall; DePaul	Pinola, MS
C	35	Tao Xu	6 ft 11 in (2.11 m)	277 lb (126 kg)	So	The Haverford School	Qingdao, China
G	45	Cody Doolin (L)	6 ft 2 in (1.88 m)	183 lb (83 kg)	Sr	Westlake	Austin, TX

Head coach

- Rex Walters (Kansas)

Assistant coach(es)

- Luke Wicks (Northern State)
- Brent Crews (Florida Atlantic)
- David Rebibo (Cal State Northridge)
- Michael Pacini (Central Florida)

Legend

- (C) Team captain
- (S) Suspended
- (I) Ineligible
- (W) Walk-on
- (L) Left team due to personal reasons after Oregon game
- Injured
- Current redshirt

== Schedule and results ==
Date time, TV	Rank^{#}	Opponent^{#}	Result	Record	Site city, state
Non-conference regular season
11/08/2013*; 7:00 pm, Dons TV		Notre Dame de Namur	W 95–57	1–0	War Memorial Gymnasium; San Francisco, CA
11/13/2013*; 8:00 pm, Dons TV		Cleveland State	W 91–82	2–0	War Memorial Gymnasium; San Francisco, CA
11/15/2013*; 7:00 pm, Dons TV		Nevada	L 90–92	2–1	War Memorial Gymnasium; San Francisco, CA
11/18/2013*; 7:00 pm, Dons TV		Idaho State	L 90–93 ^{OT}	2–2	War Memorial Gymnasium; San Francisco, CA
11/22/2013*; 6:00 pm, Watch Big Sky		at Montana	W 75–74	3–2	Dahlberg Arena; Missoula, MT
11/24/2013*; 5:00 pm, P12N		at No. 17 Oregon	L 82–100	3–3	Matthew Knight Arena; Eugene, OR
11/27/2013*; 6:00 pm, Dons TV		Sonoma State; Golden Gate Invitational	W 96–73	4–3	War Memorial Gymnasium; San Francisco, CA
11/29/2013*; 6:00 pm, Dons TV		Vermont; Golden Gate Invitational	W 72–61	5–3	War Memorial Gymnasium; San Francisco, CA
11/30/2013*; 8:15 pm, Dons TV		Illinois State; Golden Gate Invitational	L 76–90	5–4	War Memorial Gymnasium; San Francisco, CA
12/14/2013*; 7:00 pm, Dons TV		Nicholls State	W 77–48	6–4	War Memorial Gymnasium; San Francisco, CA
12/18/2013*; 5:00 pm, FS1		at St. John's	L 57–81	6–5	Carnesecca Arena; Queens, NY
12/22/2013*; 2:00 pm, Dons TV		American	W 77–69	7–5	War Memorial Gymnasium; San Francisco, CA
WCC Regular Season
12/28/2013; 7:00 pm, CSNCA		at Portland	W 87–81 ^{OT}	8–5 (1–0)	Chiles Center; Portland, OR
12/30/2013; 6:00 pm, TheW.tv		at Gonzaga	L 41–69	8–6 (1–1)	McCarthey Athletic Center; Spokane, WA
01/02/2014; 7:00 pm, TheW.tv		Loyola Marymount	W 75–61	9–6 (2–1)	War Memorial Gymnasium; San Francisco, CA
01/04/2014; 1:00 pm, CSN BAY		Pepperdine	W 76–66	10–6 (3–1)	War Memorial Gymnasium; San Francisco, CA
01/09/2014; 7:00 pm, TheW.tv		at Pacific	W 81–72 ^{OT}	11–6 (4–1)	Alex G. Spanos Center; Stockton, CA
01/11/2014; 3:00 pm, CSNCA		at Saint Mary's	L 73–88	11–7 (4–2)	McKeon Pavilion; Moraga, CA
01/16/2014; 6:00 pm, ESPNU		BYU	L 76–83	11–8 (4–3)	War Memorial Gymnasium; San Francisco, CA
01/18/2014; 7:00 pm, TheW.tv		San Diego	W 64–62	12–8 (5–3)	War Memorial Gymnasium; San Francisco, CA
01/25/2014; 5:00 pm, CSN CA		Santa Clara	W 75–66	13–8 (6–3)	War Memorial Gymnasium; San Francisco, CA
01/30/2014; 7:00 pm, TheW.tv		Portland	W 84–71	14–8 (7–3)	War Memorial Gymnasium; San Francisco, CA
02/01/2014; 7:00 pm, CSN BAY		Gonzaga	L 65–75	14–9 (7–4)	War Memorial Gymnasium; San Francisco, CA
02/06/2014; 7:00 pm, CSN BAY		at San Diego	W 74–67	15–9 (8–4)	Jenny Craig Pavilion; San Diego, CA
02/08/2014; 6:00 pm, BYUtv		at BYU	L 63–68	15–10 (8–5)	Marriott Center; Provo, UT
02/15/2014; 8:00 pm, ESPNU		at Santa Clara	W 69–63	16–10 (9–5)	Leavey Center; Santa Clara, CA
02/20/2014; 8:00 pm, CSN CA		Saint Mary's	W 73–62	17–10 (10–5)	War Memorial Gymnasium; San Francisco, CA
02/22/2014; 3:00 pm, CSN CA		Pacific	W 64–59	18–10 (11–5)	War Memorial Gymnasium; San Francisco, CA
02/27/2014; 7:00 pm, TheW.tv		at Pepperdine	W 77-53	19–10 (12–5)	Firestone Fieldhouse; Malibu, CA
03/01/2014; 7:00 pm, TheW.tv		at Loyola Marymount	W 65–61	20–10 (13–5)	Gersten Pavilion; Los Angeles, CA
WCC tournament
03/09/2014*; 7:00 pm, BYUtv		San Diego; Quarterfinals	W 69–60	21–10	Orleans Arena; Paradise, NV
03/10/2014; 8:30 pm, ESPN2		vs. BYU; Semifinals	L 77–79 ^{OT}	21–11	Orleans Arena; Paradise, NV
NIT
03/19/2014*; 6:00 pm, ESPNU	No. (4)	at (5) LSU; First round	L 63–71	21–12	War Memorial Gymnasium; San Francisco, CA
*Non-conference game. ^{#}Rankings from AP Poll, (#) during NIT is seed within region. (#) Tournament seedings in parentheses. All times are in Pacific Time.

== Game summaries ==
=== Notre Dame de Namur ===
Series History: USF leads series 1-0
Broadcasters: Pat Olson & Jim Brovelli

USF TV

Nov 8
7:00 PM PST

Recap

Notre Dame de Namur Argonauts 57, San Francisco Dons 95
Scoring by half: 25-61, 32-34
Pts: Micah Dunhour 17; Rebs: Micah Dunhour 11; Asts: Simon Enciso 4	Pts: Kruize Pinkins 19; Rebs: Cole Dickerson 6 Asts: Cody Doolin 7

War Memorial Gymnasium
San Francisco, CA
Attendance: 1,890
Referees: Sam Haddad, Courtney Holmes, Brent Watts

=== Cleveland State ===
Series History: First Meeting
Broadcasters: Pat Olson & Jim Brovelli

USF TV

Nov 13
8:20 PM PST

Recap

Cleveland State Vikings 82, San Francisco Dons 91
Scoring by half: 38-35, 44-56
Pts: Sebastian Douglas & Charlie Lee 15; Rebs: Sebastian Douglas & Jon Harris 5 Asts: Sebastian Harris & Trey Lewis 5	Pts: Mark Tollefsen 18; Rebs: Cole Dickerson 12; Asts: Cody Doolin 11

War Memorial Gymnasium
San Francisco, CA
Attendance: 1,433
Referees: Marc Beasley, Casey McClellan, Tom Nally

=== Nevada ===
Series History: Nevada leads 59-51
Broadcasters: Pat Olson & Jim Brovelli

USF TV

Nov 15
7:00 PM PST

Recap

Nevada Wolfpack 92, San Francisco Dons 90
Scoring by half: 41-43, 51-47
Pts: Deonte Burton 31; Rebs: Cole Huff 7 Asts: DJ Fenner, Michael Perez & Deonte Burton 2	Pts: Cody Doolin 33; Rebs: Cole Dickeron 8 Asts: Avry Holmes & Cody Doolin 4

War Memorial Gymnasium
San Francisco, CA
Attendance: 2,391
Referees: Gregory Nixon, Deldre Carter, Brett Nansel

=== Idaho State ===
Series History: USF leads 4-0
Broadcasters: Pat Olson & Jim Brovelli

USF TV

Nov 18
7:00 PM PST

Recap

Idaho State Bengals 93, San Francisco Dons 90 (OT)
Scoring by half: 39-44, 43-38 Overtime: 11-8
Pts: Chris Hansen 33; Rebs: Andre Hatchett 12; Asts: Tomas Sanchez 5	Pts: Adams Chris 21; Rebs: Mark Tollefsen 11; Asts: Cody Doolin 6

War Memorial Gymnasium
San Francisco, CA
Attendance: 1,262
Referees: Michael Reed, Frank Harvey, Michael Scyphers

=== Montana ===
Series History: San Francisco leads 5-0
Broadcasters: Tom Schultz

Watch Big Sky

Nov 22
6:05 PM MST

Recap

San Francisco Dons 75, Montana Grizzlies 74
Scoring by half: 30-27, 45-47
Pts: Kruize Pinkins 22; Rebs: Cole Dickerson 12; Asts: Matt Glover 4	Pts: Kareem Jamar 25; Rebs: Kareem Jamar 6 Asts: Kareem Jamar 8

Dahlberg Arena
Missoula, MT
Attendance: 3,615
Referees: Deldre Carr, Gregory Nixon, Brent Watts

=== Oregon ===
Series History: Oregon leads 7-2
Broadcasters: Paul Sunderland & Ernie Kent

P12N

Nov 24
5:05 PM PST

Recap

San Francisco Dons 82, Oregon Ducks 100
Scoring by half: 35-40, 47-60
Pts: Kruize Pinkins 20; Rebs: Kruize Pinkins 11; Asts: Matt Glover 4	Pts: Elgin Cook 18; Rebs: Mike Moser 8 Asts: Johnathan Loyd 6

Matthew Knight Arena
Eugene, OR
Attendance: 6,084
Referees: Verne Harris, Daryl Gelinas, Deldre Carr

=== Golden Gate Challenge: Sonoma State ===
Series History: San Francisco leads 7-0
Broadcasters: Pat Olson & Jim Brovelli

USF TV

Nov 27
6:00 PM PST

Recap

Sonoma State Seawolves 73, San Francisco Dons 96
Scoring by half: 29-48, 44-48
Pts: Brandon Glanz 11; Rebs: Sterling Arterberry & James Davis 5 Asts: Isaiah Brown 3	Pts: Cole Dickerson 23; Rebs: Cole Dickerson 10; Asts: Cole Dickerson 3

War Memorial Gymnasium
San Francisco, CA
Attendance: 1,420
Referees: Sam Haddad, Michael Rapp, Courtney Holmes

=== Golden Gate Challenge: Vermont ===
Series History: San Francisco leads 1-0
Broadcasters: Pat Olson & Jim Brovelli

USF TV

Nov 29
6:00 PM PST

Recap

Vermont Catamounts 61, San Francisco Dons 72
Scoring by half: 26-30, 35-42
Pts: Clancy Rugg 13; Rebs: Brian Voelkel & Clancy Rugg 6 Asts: Brian Voelkel 6	Pts: Cole Dickeron 28; Rebs: Tim Derksen 6 Asts: Matt Glover 6

War Memorial Gymnasium
San Francisco, CA
Attendance: 1,178
Referees: Ronald Brokenbrough, Scott Harris, Coban Lopez

=== Golden Gate Challenge: Illinois State ===
Series History: Illinois State leads 1-0
Broadcasters: Pat Olson & Jim Brovelli

USF TV

Nov 30
8:15 PM PST

Recap

Illinois State Redbirds 90, San Francisco Dons 76
Scoring by half: 34-28, 56-48
Pts: Paris Lee & Bobby Hunter 15; Rebs: Daishon Knight 8 Asts: Daishon Knight 6	Pts: Tim Derksen 18; Rebs: Kruize Pinkins 10; Asts: Matt Glover 6

War Memorial Gymnasium
San Francisco, CA
Attendance: 1,414
Referees: Horace Shields, Nate Harris, Tom Nally

=== Nicholls State ===
Series History: First Meeting
Broadcasters: Pat Olson & Jim Brovelli

USF TV

Dec 14
7:00 PM PST

Recap

Nicholls State Colonels 48, San Francisco Dons 77
Scoring by half: 17-30, 31-47
Pts: Dantrell Thomas 13; Rebs: Sam McBeth 5 Asts: Jeremy Smith 3	Pts: Cole Dickeron 20; Rebs: Kruize Pinkins & Cole Dickerson 8 Asts: Avry Holmes 4

War Memorial Gymnasium
San Francisco, CA
Attendance: 1,398
Referees: Bruce Hicks, Tom Spitznagel, Jeff Ketchu

=== St. John's ===
Series History: St. John's leads 4-3
Broadcasters: Justin Kutcher & Jim Spanarkel

FS1

Dec 18
8:00 PM EST

Recap

San Francisco Dons 57, St. John's Red Storm 81
Scoring by half: 31-43, 26-38
Pts: Mark Tollefsen 14; Rebs: Kruize Pinkins 6 Asts: Tim Derksen & Matt Glover 4	Pts: D'Angelo Harrison 18; Rebs: Chris Obekpa 7 Asts: Rysheed Jordan 4

Carnesecca Arena
Queens, NY
Attendance: 4,282
Referees: John Gaffney, Jamie Luckie, Clarence Armstrong

=== American ===
Series History: San Francisco leads 1-0
Broadcasters: Pat Olson & Jim Brovelli

USF TV

Dec 22
2:00 PM PST

Recap

American Eagles 69, San Francisco Dons 77
Scoring by half: 30-33, 39-44
Pts: John Schoof 22; Rebs: Darius Gardner 8 Asts: Tony Wroblicky 7	Pts: Avry Holmes 15; Rebs: Cole Dickerson 6 Asts: Matt Glover 5

War Memorial Gymnasium
San Francisco, CA
Attendance: 1,357
Referees: Ken Ditty, Ron Brokenbrough, Coban Lopez

=== Portland ===
Series History: San Francisco leads 51-26
Broadcasters: Tom Glasgow & Joe Cravens

CSNCA

Dec 28
7:00 PM PST

Recap

San Francisco Dons 87, 'Portland Pilots 81 (OT)
Scoring by half: 27-35, 42-34 Overtime: 18-12
Pts: Mark Tollefsen 22; Rebs: Cole Dickerson 11; Asts: Matt Glover 5	Pts: Kevin Bailey 24; Rebs: Drew Nicholas 4 Asts: Alec Wintering 13

Chiles Center
Portland, OR
Attendance: 1,486
Referees: Frank Harvey, Tommy Nunez, Marc Beasley

=== Gonzaga ===
Series History: Gonzaga leads series 46-22
Broadcasters: Greg Hesiter & Richard Fox

TheW.tv

Dec 30
6:00 pm PST

Recap

San Francisco Dons 41, Gonzaga Bulldogs 69
Scoring by half: 23-41, 18-28
Pts: Avry Holmes 16; Rebs: Kruize Pinkins 10; Asts: Adams Chris & Kruize Pinkins 3	Pts: Drew Barham 15; Rebs: Drew Barham 9 Asts: David Stockton 7

McCarthey Athletic Center
Spokane, WA
Attendance: 6,000
Referees: Michael Greenstein, Michael Reed, Richard Batsell

=== Loyola Marymount ===
Series History: San Francisco leads 107-39
Broadcasters: Pat Olson & Jim Brovelli

TheW.tv

Jan 2
7:00 PM PST

Recap

Loyola Marymount Lions 61, San Francisco Dons 75
Scoring by half: 23-40, 38-35
Pts: Anthony Ireland 18; Rebs: Gabe Levin & Chase Flint 5 Asts: Anthony Ireland 2	Pts: Cole Dickerson 20; Rebs: Matt Glover 11; Asts: Avry Holmes, Kruize Pinkins, Mark Tollefsen, Matt Christiansen, & Adams Chris 2

War Memorial Gymnasium
San Francisco, CA
Attendance: 1,448
Referees: Ken Ditty, Deldre Carr, Glen Mayberry

=== Pepperdine ===
Series History: San Francisco leads 71-50
Broadcasters: Barry Tompkins & Jarron Collins

CSN BAY

Jan 4
1:00 PM PST

Recap

Pepperdine Waves 66, San Francisco Dons 76
Scoring by half: 27-19, 39-57
Pts: Brendan Lane 13; Rebs: Stacy Davis 13; Asts: Amadi Udenyi 2	Pts: Kruize Pinkins 19; Rebs: Kruize Pinkins 11; Asts: Matt Glover 6

War Memorial Gymnasium
San Francisco, CA
Attendance: 1,451
Referees: Brett Nansel, Daryl Gelinas, Bob Rorke

=== Pacific ===
Series History: San Francisco leads 60-34
Broadcasters: Rich Cellini & John Stege

TheW.tv

Jan 9
7:00 PM PST

Recap

San Francisco Dons 81, Pacific Tigers 72 (OT)
Scoring by half: 30-36, 33-27 Overtime: 18-9
Pts: Avry Holmes 18; Rebs: Matt Glover 9 Asts: Avry Holmes 8	Pts: Andrew Bock 17; Rebs: Sama Taku, Tony Gill, & Aaron Short 7 Asts: Andrew Bock 4

Alex G. Spanos Center
Stockton, CA
Attendance: 1,448
Referees: Tommy Nunez, Kurt Walker, Coban Lopez

=== Saint Mary's ===
Series History: San Francisco leads 103-72
Broadcasters: Glen Kuiper & Dan Belluomini

CSNCA

Jan 11
3:00 PM PST

Recap

San Francisco Dons 73, Saint Mary's Gaels 88
Scoring by half: 28-43, 45-45
Pts: Avry Holmes 17; Rebs: Kruize Pinkins 9 Asts: Mark Tollefsen 3	Pts: Stephen Holt 21; Rebs: Brad Waldow 7 Asts: Stephen Holt 5

McKeon Pavilion
Moraga, CA
Attendance: 3,500
Referees: Frank Harvey, Horace Shields, Marc Beasley

=== BYU ===
Broadcasters: Roxy Bernstein & Corey Williams
Series History: BYU leads 8-7

ESPNU

Jan 16
6:00 PM PST

Recap

BYU Cougars 83, San Francisco Dons 76
Scoring by half: 34-37, 49-39
Pts: Kyle Collinsworth 19; Rebs: Nate Austin 8 Asts: Tyler Haws, Skyler Halford, Matt Carlino, Josh Sharp, & Frank Bartley IV 1	Pts: Cole Dickerson 26; Rebs: Cole Dickerson 14; Asts: Avry Holmes 5

War Memorial Gymnasium
San Francisco, CA
Attendance: 2,137
Referees: Greg Nixon, Kevin Brill, Tony Padilla

=== San Diego ===
Series History: San Francisco leads 37-34
Broadcasters: Pat Olson & Jim Brovelli

TheW.tv

Jan 18
7:00 PM PST

Recap

San Diego Toreros 62, San Francisco Dons 64
Scoring by half: 36-36, 26-28
Pts: Johnny Dee 16; Rebs: Jito Kok 7 Asts: Christopher Anderson 5	Pts: Avry Holmes 15; Rebs: Kruize Pinkins 11; Asts: Matt Glover, Avry Holmes, & Kruize Pinkins 2

War Memorial Gymnasium
San Francisco, CA
Attendance: 1,658
Referees: Glen Mayberry, Daryl Gelinas, Courtney Holmes

=== Santa Clara ===
Series History: Santa Clara leads 111-101
Broadcasters: Glen Kuiper & Dan Belluomini

CSNCA

Jan 25
5:00 PM PST

Recap

Santa Clara Broncos 66, San Francisco Dons 75
Scoring by half: 22-34, 44-41
Pts: Jared Brownridge 30; Rebs: Yannick Atanga 6 Asts: Brandon Clark 4	Pts: Cole Dickerson 28; Rebs: Matt Glover 13; Asts: Tim Derksen 4

War Memorial Gymnasium
San Francisco, CA
Attendance: 2,683
Referees: Michael Scyphers, Ken Ditty, Klaus Endrissat

=== Portland ===
Series History: San Francisco leads 52-26
Broadcasters: Rich Cellini & John Stege

TheW.tv

Jan 29
7:00 PM PST

Recap

Portland Pilots 71, San Francisco Dons 84
Scoring by half: 37-47, 34-37
Pts: Bryce Pressley & Alec Wintering 15; Rebs: Thomas Van Der Mars & Riley Barker 4 Asts: Alec Wintering 5	Pts: Cole Dickeron 21; Rebs: Kruize Pinkins 7 Asts: Matt Glover 4

War Memorial Gymnasium
San Francisco, CA
Attendance: 2,199
Referees: Kevin Brill, Glen Mayberry, Deldre Carr

=== Gonzaga ===
Series History: Gonzaga leads 47-22
Broadcasters: Glen Kuiper & Stan Morrison

CSN BAY

Feb 1
7:00 PM PST

Recap

Gonzaga Bulldogs 75, San Francisco Dons 65
Scoring by half: 32-28, 43-37
Pts: Sam Dower 24; Rebs: Kyle Dranginis 12; Asts: Kevin Pangos & David Stockton 2	Pts: Avry Holmes 18; Rebs: Matt Glover 8 Asts: Matt Glover 5

War Memorial Gymnasium
San Francisco, CA
Attendance: 4,200
Referees: Klaus Endrissat, Ronald Brokenbrough, Jeff Ketchu
