= 2013–14 Portland Pilots men's basketball team =

American college basketball season

2013–14 Portland Pilots men's basketball
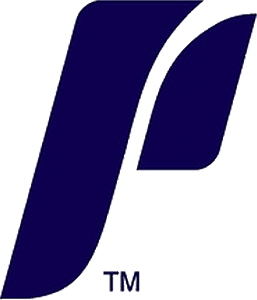

2013 South Point Holiday Hoops Classic Champions
- Conference: West Coast Conference
- Record: 15–16 (7–11 WCC)
- Head coach: Eric Reveno (8th season)
- Assistant coaches: Eric Jackson; Michael Wolf; Colin Pfaff
- Home arena: Chiles Center

2013–14 West Coast Conference men's basketball standings
| | Conf. | | | | Overall |
| Team | W | | L | PCT | W | | L | PCT |
|---|---|---|---|---|---|---|---|---|
| Gonzaga † | 15 | – | 3 | .833 | 29 | – | 7 | .806 |
| BYU | 13 | – | 5 | .722 | 23 | – | 12 | .657 |
| San Francisco | 13 | – | 5 | .722 | 21 | – | 12 | .636 |
| Saint Mary's | 11 | – | 7 | .611 | 23 | – | 12 | .657 |
| Pepperdine | 8 | – | 10 | .444 | 15 | – | 16 | .484 |
| San Diego | 7 | – | 11 | .389 | 18 | – | 17 | .514 |
| Portland | 7 | – | 11 | .389 | 15 | – | 16 | .484 |
| Pacific | 6 | – | 12 | .333 | 18 | – | 16 | .529 |
| Santa Clara | 6 | – | 12 | .333 | 14 | – | 19 | .424 |
| Loyola Marymount | 4 | – | 14 | .222 | 13 | – | 19 | .406 |
† Conference tournament winner

The 2013–14 Portland Pilots men's basketball team represented the University of Portland during the 2013–14 NCAA Division I men's basketball season. The Pilots, led by eighth-year head coach Eric Reveno, played their home games at the Chiles Center and were members of the West Coast Conference. They finished the season 15–16, 7–11 in WCC play to finish in a tie for sixth place. They lost in the first round of the West Coast Conference tournament to Loyola Marymount.

== Before the season ==
=== Departures ===
| Name | Number | Pos. | Height | Weight | Year | Hometown | Notes |
|---|---|---|---|---|---|---|---|
| Derek Rodgers | 15 | G | 6'1" | 210 | Senior | Rancho Cucamonga, CA | Graduated |

=== Recruitment ===
The Pilots had 3 men commit with Letters of Intent. A fourth man, Volodymyr Gerun, transferred to Portland and will be eligible immediately.

College recruiting
| Name | Hometown | School | Height | Weight | Commit date |
|---|---|---|---|---|---|
| Bobby Sharp; G | Santa Rosa, CA | Santa Rosa; Santa Rosa JC | 6 ft 0 in (1.83 m) | 175 lb (79 kg) | Mar 30, 2013 |
| Bobby Sharp; G | Recruit ratings: Scout: Rivals: (JC) | | | | |
| Alec Wintering; G | Concord, NC | United Faith | 5 ft 9 in (1.75 m) | 160 lb (73 kg) | Aug 1, 2012 |
| Alec Wintering; G | Recruit ratings: Scout: Rivals: (62) | | | | |
| Aitor Zubizarreta; G | Azpeitia | | 6 ft 3 in (1.91 m) | 170 lb (77 kg) | Apr 17, 2013 |
| Aitor Zubizarreta; G | Recruit ratings: Scout: Rivals: (NR) | | | | |
| Volodymyr Gerun; F/C | Dnipropetrovsk | Canarias Basketball Academy; West Virginia | 6 ft 10 in (2.08 m) | 240 lb (110 kg) | May 13, 2013 |
| Volodymyr Gerun; F/C | Recruit ratings: Scout: Rivals: (NR) | | | | |
Overall recruit ranking: Scout: nr Rivals: nr ESPN: nr
Note: In many cases, Scout, Rivals, 247Sports, On3, and ESPN may conflict in their listings of height and weight.; In these cases, the average was taken. ESPN grades are on a 100-point scale.; Sources: "Portland Pilots 2013 Basketball Commitments". Rivals.; "2013 Portland Pilots Basketball Commits". Scout.; "ESPN 2013 Portland Pilots Basketball recruits". ESPN.; "Scout.com Team Recruiting Rankings". Scout.; "2013 Team Ranking". Rivals.

== Roster ==
2013–14 Portland Pilots men's basketball team
Players
Coaches

| Pos. | # | Name | Height | Weight | Year | Previous school | Hometown |
|---|---|---|---|---|---|---|---|
| G | 0 | Kevin Bailey | 6 ft 5 in (1.96 m) | 205 lb (93 kg) | Jr | East Clovis | Clovis, CA |
| G | 1 | Bryce Pressley | 6 ft 4 in (1.93 m) | 200 lb (91 kg) | So | Jesuit | Sacramento, CA |
| G | 2 | Alec Wintering | 5 ft 11 in (1.8 m) | 160 lb (73 kg) | Fr | United Faith | Concord, NC |
| G | 3 | Tanner Riley | 6 ft 3 in (1.91 m) | 200 lb (91 kg) | Sr | Mount Si | North Bend, WA |
| F | 5 | John Bailey | 6 ft 8 in (2.03 m) | 215 lb (98 kg) | Sr | Dobson | Mesa, AZ |
| G | 11 | Bobby Sharp | 6 ft 2 in (1.88 m) | 165 lb (75 kg) | Jr | Cardinal Newman; Santa Rosa JC | Santa Rosa, CA |
| C | 12 | Thomas van der Mars | 6 ft 11 in (2.11 m) | 235 lb (107 kg) | Jr | Erasmus U Canarias Basketball Academy | Gouda, Netherlands |
| C | 14 | Riley Barker | 6 ft 10 in (2.08 m) | 240 lb (109 kg) | RS Jr | White Rock Christian Academy | Surrey, BC, Canada |
| G | 21 | Korey Thieleke | 6 ft 3 in (1.91 m) | 185 lb (84 kg) | Sr | West | Bakersfield, CA |
| F | 32 | Ryan Nicholas | 6 ft 7 in (2.01 m) | 245 lb (111 kg) | Sr | Gonzaga Prep | Spokane, WA |
| G | 35 | David Carr | 6 ft 3 in (1.91 m) | 180 lb (82 kg) | Jr | Central Catholic | Portland, OR |
| F/C | 52 | Volodymyr Gerun | 6 ft 10 in (2.08 m) | 250 lb (113 kg) | Jr | Canarias Basketball Academy; West Virginia | Dnipropetrovsk, Ukraine |
| G | 54 | Aitor Zubizarreta | 6 ft 3 in (1.91 m) | 175 lb (79 kg) | Fr | Basque Country of Spain | Azpeitia, Gipuzkoa |

Head coach

- Eric Reveno (Stanford)

Assistant coach(es)

- Eric Jackson (Green Bay)
- Michael Wolf (Stanford)
- Colin Pfaff (Cal State Monterey Bay)

Legend

- (C) Team captain
- (S) Suspended
- (I) Ineligible
- (W) Walk-on
- Injured
- Current redshirt

== Schedule and results ==
The five game European tour was broadcast on Stretch Internet with Associate Athletic Director Jason Brough acting as the broadcaster.

| Date time, TV | Rank^{#} | Opponent^{#} | Result | Record | Site city, state |
Exhibition
| 08/12/2013*; 10:40 am | | vs. No. 15 FIBA Angola | L 78–83 | – | Palacio de Deportes; Madrid, Community of Madrid |
| 08/13/2013*; 10:30 am | | vs. No. 24 FIBA Venezuela | L 72–75 | – | Palacio de Deportes; Madrid, Community of Madrid |
| 08/15/2013*; 11:30 am | | vs. Gran Canaria U20 | W 86–20 | – | Centro Insular; Las Palmas, Canary Islands |
| 08/17/2013*; 11:30 am | | vs. Canarias Academy All-Stars | W 111–70 | – | Centro Insular; Las Palmas, Canary Islands |
| 08/18/2013*; 11:30 am | | vs. Gran Canaria Select | W 111–48 | – | Centro Insular; Las Palmas, Canary Islands |
| 10/26/2013*; 3:30 pm, Pilots TV | | Concordia Irvine | W 92–77 | – | Chiles Center; Portland, OR |
Non-conference regular season
| 11/08/2013*; 7:30 pm, Pilots TV | | UC Davis | W 100–87 | 1–0 | Chiles Center; Portland, OR |
| 11/13/2013*; 6:00 pm, P12N | | at Oregon State | L 73–79 | 1–1 | Gill Coliseum; Corvallis, OR |
| 11/18/2013*; 4:00 pm, BTN | | at No. 1 Michigan State; Coaches Vs. Cancer Classic | L 67–82 | 1–2 | Breslin Student Events Center; E. Lansing, MI |
| 11/21/2013*; 2:00 pm, Pilots TV | | Idaho; Coaches Vs. Cancer Classic | W 88–74 | 2–2 | Chiles Center; Portland, OR |
| 11/22/2013*; 7:00 pm, Pilots TV | | Columbia; Coaches Vs. Cancer Classic | W 69–52 | 3–2 | Chiles Center; Portland, OR |
| 11/23/2013*; 7:00 pm, Pilots TV | | North Texas; Coaches Vs. Cancer Classic | L 72–77 ^{2OT} | 3–3 | Chiles Center; Portland, OR |
| 11/27/2013*; 7:00 pm, Pilots TV | | San Jose State | W 86–69 | 4–3 | Chiles Center; Portland, OR |
| 12/01/2013*; 1:00 pm, Pilots TV | | Southern Utah | W 86–57 | 5–3 | Chiles Center; Portland, OR |
| 12/07/2013*; 7:00 pm, Watch Big Sky | | at Portland State | W 92–76 | 6–3 | Stott Center; Portland, OR |
| 12/15/2013*; 2:00 pm, Pilots TV | | Montana State | L 69–72 | 6–4 | Chiles Center; Portland, OR |
| 12/20/2013*; 5:00 pm, Holiday Hoops TV | | vs. Bradley; South Point Holiday Hoops Classic | W 74–53 | 7–4 | South Point Arena; Enterprise, NV |
| 12/21/2013*; 8:00 pm, Holiday Hoops TV | | vs. Princeton; South Point Holiday Hoops Classic | W 93–79 | 8–4 | South Point Arena; Enterprise, NV |
WCC regular season
| 12/28/2013; 7:00 pm, ROOT NW | | San Francisco | L 81–87 ^{OT} | 8–5 (0–1) | Chiles Center; Portland, OR |
| 12/30/2013; 3:00 pm, TheW.tv | | Santa Clara | L 68–70 | 8–6 (0–2) | Chiles Center; Portland, OR |
| 01/02/2014; 7:00 pm, ROOT NW | | Pacific | W 72–64 | 9–6 (1–2) | Chiles Center; Portland, OR |
| 01/04/2014; 7:00 pm, ROOT NW | | Saint Mary's | L 63–72 | 9–7 (1–3) | Chiles Center; Portland, OR |
| 01/09/2014; 8:00 pm, ESPNU | | No. 22 Gonzaga | W 82–73 | 10–7 (2–3) | Chiles Center; Portland, OR |
| 01/16/2014; 7:00 pm, TheW.tv | | at Loyola Marymount | W 71–57 | 11–7 (3–3) | Gersten Pavilion; Los Angeles, CA |
| 01/18/2014; 5:00 pm, TV-32 | | at Pepperdine | L 65–76 | 11–8 (3–4) | Firestone Fieldhouse; Malibu, CA |
| 01/23/2014; 7:00 pm, ROOT NW | | BYU | W 114–110 ^{3OT} | 12–8 (4–4) | Chiles Center; Portland, OR |
| 01/25/2014; 1:00 pm, ROOT NW | | San Diego | L 63–65 | 12–9 (4–5) | Chiles Center; Portland, OR |
| 01/30/2014; 7:00 pm, TheW.tv | | at San Francisco | L 71–84 | 12–10 (4–6) | War Memorial Gymnasium; San Francisco, CA |
| 02/01/2014; 7:00 pm, TheW.tv | | at Santa Clara | W 76–64 | 13–10 (5–6) | Leavey Center; Santa Clara, CA |
| 02/05/2014; 8:00 pm, ROOT NW | | at No. 23 Gonzaga | L 66–71 | 13–11 (5–7) | McCarthey Athletic Center; Spokane, WA |
| 02/13/2014; 7:00 pm, TheW.tv | | Loyola Marymount | W 71–64 | 14–11 (6–7) | Chiles Center; Portland, OR |
| 02/15/2014; 1:00 pm, ROOT NW | | Pepperdine | W 74–62 | 15–11 (7–7) | Chiles Center; Portland, OR |
| 02/20/2014; 6:00 pm, ROOT NW | | at San Diego | L 59–61 | 15–12 (7–8) | Jenny Craig Pavilion; San Diego, CA |
| 02/22/2014; 6:00 pm, BYUtv | | at BYU | L 72–89 | 15–13 (7–9) | Marriott Center; Provo, UT |
| 02/27/2014; 6:00 pm, ROOT NW | | at Saint Mary's | L 61-70 | 15–14 (7–10) | McKeon Pavilion; Moraga, CA |
| 03/01/2014; 3:00 pm, TheW.tv | | at Pacific | L 65–68 | 15–15 (7–11) | Alex G. Spanos Center; Stockton, CA |
2014 WCC tournament
| 03/06/2014; 6:00 pm, BYUtv | (7) | vs. (10) Loyola Marymount; First round | L 64–67 | 15–16 | Orleans Arena; Paradise, NV |
*Non-conference game. ^{#}Rankings from AP Poll. (#) Tournament seedings in parentheses. All times are in Pacific Time.

Source: Schedule

== Game summaries ==
=== Exhibition: Concordia Irvine ===
Oct 26
3:30 PM PDT

Concordia Irvine Eagles 77, Portland Pilots 92
Scoring by half: 46-44, 31-48
| Pts: Tim Harris 23; Rebs: Josh Smith 10; Asts: Tim Harris & Nolan Abernathy 2 | Pts: Kevin Bailey 19; Rebs: Bryce Pressley 10; Asts: Bryce Pressley & Alec Wintering 3 |

Chiles Center
Portland, OR
Attendance: N/A
Referees: Kevin Brill, Tom Spitznagel, Toby Doolittle

=== UC Davis ===
Series History: Portland leads series 3–0

Nov 8
7:30 PM PST

Recap

UC Davis Aggies 83, Portland Pilots 100
Scoring by half: 39-52, 44-48
| Pts: Josh Ritchart 18; Rebs: Corey Hawkins 8 Asts: Corey Hawkins 7 | Pts: Kevin Bailey 29; Rebs: Riley Barker 7 Asts: Bryce Pressley 7 |

Chiles Center
Portland, OR
Attendance: 1,329
Referees: Klaus Endrissat, Jeff Ketchu, Coban Lopez

=== Oregon State ===
Series History: Oregon State leads series 51–16
Broadcasters: Brian Webber and Lamar Hurd

P12N

Nov 13
6:00 PM PST

Recap

Portland Pilots 73, Oregon State Beavers 79
Scoring by half: 33-41, 40-38
| Pts: Bobby Sharp 18; Rebs: Ryan Nicholas 13; Asts: Kevin Bailey 5 | Pts: Roberto Nelson 24; Rebs: Devon Collier 11; Asts: Roberto Nelson 7 |

Gill Coliseum
Beaverton, OR
Attendance: 3,179
Referees: Verne Harris, Chris Rastatter, Bruce Hicks

=== Coaches vs. Cancer: #1 Michigan State ===
Series History: Michigan State leads series 1–0
Broadcasters: Eric Collins and Jim Jackson

BTN

Nov 18
7:00 PM EST

Recap

Portland Pilots 67, #1 Michigan State Spartans 82
Scoring by half: 32-36, 35-46
| Pts: Kevin Bailey 12; Rebs: Volodymyr Gerun 7 Asts: Bryce Pressley 4 | Pts: Keith Appling 25; Rebs: Branden Dawson 10; Asts: Keith Appling 7 |

Breslin Center
East Lansing, MI
Attendance: 14,797
Referees: Jim Schipper, Jim Burr, Mike Kitts

=== Coaches vs. Cancer: Idaho ===
Series History: Idaho leads series 13–11

Nov 21
2:00 PM PST

Recap

Idaho Vandals 74, Portland Pilots 88
Scoring by half: 31-41, 43-47
| Pts: Stephen Madison 19; Rebs: Stephen Madison 6 Asts: Sekou Wiggs 4 | Pts: Thomas Van Der Mars 15; Rebs: Thomas Van Der Mars 12; Asts: David Carr 4 |

Chiles Center
Portland, OR
Attendance: 1,159
Referees: Bruce Hicks, Mark Cook, Jimmy Casas

=== Coaches vs. Cancer:Columbia ===
Series History: Columbia leads 1–0

Nov 22
7:00 PM PST

Recap

Columbia Lions 52, Portland Pilots 69
Scoring by half: 27-35, 25-34
| Pts: Jeff Coby & Luke Petrasek 10; Rebs: Jeff Coby 6 Asts: Jeff Coby, Grant Mullins, Maodo Lu, & Noah Springwater 1 | Pts: Thomas Van Der Mars 14; Rebs: Thomas Van Der Mars & Volodymyr Gerun 6 Asts: Kevin Bailey, Ryan Nicholas, & Volodymyr Gerun 3 |

Chiles Center
Portland, OR
Attendance: 1,444
Referees: Tim Spitznagel, Scott Brown, Toby Doolittle

=== Coaches vs. Cancer: North Texas ===
Series History: First Meeting

Nov 23
7:00 PM PST

Recap

North Texas Mean Green 77, Portland Pilots 72 (OT)
Scoring by half: 20-28, 33-25 Overtime: 10-10, 14-9
| Pts: TJ Taylor 21; Rebs: Chris Jones 10; Asts: Chris Jones 6 | Pts: Thomas Van Der Mars 21; Rebs: Ryan Nicholas 16; Asts: Bryce Pressley 7 |

Chiles Center
Portland, OR
Attendance: 1,668
Referees: Michael Irving, Gregory Nixon, Nate Harris

=== San Jose State ===
Series History: San Jose State leads 1-1

Nov 26
7:00 PM PST

Recap

San Jose State Spartans 69, Portland Pilots 86
Scoring by half: 33-37, 36-49
| Pts: Rashad Muhammad 23; Rebs: Jalen James 8 Asts: DJ Brown & Jalen James 2 | Pts: Kevin Bailey 22; Rebs: Ryan Nicholas 14; Asts: Bryce Pressley 6 |

Chiles Center
Portland, OR
Attendance: 1,036
Referees: Deron White, Kurt Walker, Corban Lopez

=== Southern Utah ===
Series History: Series even 1-1

Nov 23
1:00 PM PST

Recap

Southern Utah Thunderbirds 57, Portland Pilots 86
Scoring by half: 22-38, 35-48
| Pts: Trey Kennedy 12; Rebs: Cal Hanks & Jaren Jeffery 4 Asts: John Marshall 8 | Pts: Thomas Van Der Mars 17; Rebs: Ryan Nicholas 9 Asts: Alec Wintering 10 |

Chiles Center
Portland, OR
Attendance: 1,013
Referees: Kevin Brill, Tommy Nunez, Horace Shields

=== Portland State ===
Series History: Portland leads 33–17

Nov 26
7:05 PM PST

Recap

Portland Pilots 92, Portland State Vikings 76
Scoring by half: 47-40, 45-36
| Pts: Kevin Bailey 23; Rebs: Thomas Van Der Mars 18; Asts: Alec Wintering 4 | Pts: Tim Douglas 27; Rebs: Aaron Moore 7 Asts: Tim Douglas & Gary Winston 3 |

Stott Center
Portland, OR
Attendance: 1,199
Referees: Chris Rastatter, DG Nelson, Deldre Carr

=== Montana State ===
Series History: Portland leads series 13–10

Dec 15
2:00 PM PST

Recap

Montana State Bobcats 72, Portland Pilots 69
Scoring by half: 30-32, 42-37
| Pts: Flavien Davis 19; Rebs: Marcus Colbert 6 Asts: Marcus Colbert 7 | Pts: Kevin Bailey 26; Rebs: Ryan Nicholas 15; Asts: Alec Wintering 7 |

Chiles Center
Portland, OR
Attendance: 1,043
Referees: Michael Reed, Ken Ditty, Richard Batsell

=== South Point Holiday Hoops: Bradley ===
Series History: Portland leads 2–1

Dec 20
5:15 PM PST

Recap

Portland Pilots 74, Bradley Braves 53
Scoring by half: 28-23, 46-30
| Pts: Ryan Nicholas 18; Rebs: Thomas Van Der Mars 8 Asts: Alec Wintering & Bryce Pressley 3 | Pts: Omari Grier 17; Rebs: Xzavier Taylor 5 Asts: Walt Lemon Jr. 3 |

South Point Arena
Enterprise, NV
Attendance: N/A
Referees: JB Caldwell, Landon Brandes, Jim Wilkening

=== South Point Holiday Hoops: Princeton ===
Series History: First Meeting

Dec 21
2:00 PM PST

Recap

Princeton Tigers 79, Portland Pilots 93
Scoring by half: 36-41, 43-52
| Pts: T.J. Bray 25; Rebs: Will Barrett 6 Asts: T.J. Bray 5 | Pts: Bryce Pressley 25; Rebs: Ryan Nicholas 9 Asts: Kevin Bailey 4 |

South Point Arena
Enterprise, NV
Attendance: 316
Referees: Darryl Smith, Edwin Young, James Wilkening

=== San Francisco ===
Series History: San Francisco leads 51–26
Broadcasters: Tom Glasgow & Joe Cravens

ROOT NW

Dec 28
7:00 PM PST

Recap

San Francisco Dons 87, 'Portland Pilots 81 (OT)
Scoring by half: 27-35, 42-34 Overtime: 18-12
| Pts: Mark Tollefsen 22; Rebs: Cole Dickerson 11; Asts: Matt Glover 5 | Pts: Kevin Bailey 24; Rebs: Drew Nicholas 4 Asts: Alec Wintering 13 |

Chiles Center
Portland, OR
Attendance: 1,486
Referees: Frank Harvey, Tommy Nunez, Marc Beasley

=== Santa Clara ===
Series History: Santa Clara leads 57–30
Broadcasters: Roxy Bernstein & Kris Johnson

TheW.tv

Dec 30
3:00 PM PST

Recap

Santa Clara Broncos 76, Portland Pilots 68
Scoring by half: 37-31, 39-37
| Pts: Brandon Clark, Evan Roquemore, & Jared Brownridge 20; Rebs: Jerry Brown, Jared Brownridge, Evan Roquemore, & Yannick Atanga 4 Asts: Brandon Clark & Evan Roquemore 6 | Pts: Thomas Van Der Mars 23; Rebs: Ryan Nicholas 13; Asts: Bryce Pressley 6 |

Chiles Center
Portland, OR
Attendance: 1,479
Referees: Kevin Brill, Greg Nixon, Deldre Carr

=== Pacific ===
Series History: Pacific leads 20–8
Broadcasters: Tom Glasgow & Bill Krueger

ROOT NW

Jan 2
7:00 PM PST

Recap

Pacific Tigers 64, Portland Pilots 72
Scoring by half: 28-35, 36-37
| Pts: Sama Taku 19; Rebs: Trevin Harris & Tony Gill 9 Asts: T.J. Wallace 5 | Pts: Thomas Van Der Mars 18; Rebs: Thomas Van Der Mars 13; Asts: Alec Wintering 5 |

Chiles Center
Portland, OR
Attendance: 1,173
Referees: Deron White, Daryl Gelinas, Brett Nansel

=== Saint Mary's ===
Series History: Saint Mary's leads 56–29
Broadcasters: Tom Glasgow & Bill Krueger

ROOT NW

Jan 4
8:00 PM PST

Recap

Saint Mary's Gaels 72, Portland Pilots 63
Scoring by half: 39-33, 33-30
| Pts: Stephen Holt 19; Rebs: Brad Waldow 8 Asts: Stephen Holt & James Walker III 2 | Pts: Ryan Nicholas 12; Rebs: Thomas Van Der Mars 8 Asts: Kevin Bailey, Bryce Pressley, & Alec Wnitering 3 |

Chiles Center
Portland, OR
Attendance: 2,304
Referees: Richard Batsell, Klaus Endrissat, Jeff Ketchu

=== Gonzaga ===
Series History: Gonzaga leads series 91–65
Broadcasters: Roxy Bernstein & Jarron Collins

ESPNU

Jan 9
8:00 PM PST

Recap

Gonzaga Bulldogs 73, Portland Pilots 82
Scoring by half: 31-39, 42-43
| Pts: Sam Dower 14; Rebs: Angel Nunez & Kyle Dranginis 5 Asts: Kyle Dranginis & Kevin Pangos 6 | Pts: Bryce Pressley 16; Rebs: Ryan Nicholas 9 Asts: Bryce Pressley 4 |

Chiles Center
Portland, OR
Attendance: 4,714
Referees: Frank Harvey, Glen Mayberry, James Giron

=== Loyola Marymount ===
Series History: Loyola Marymount leads 47–42
Broadcasters: Justin Alderson & Kris Johnson

TheW.tv

Jan 16
8:00 PM PST

Recap

Portland Pilots 71, Loyola Marymount Lions 57
Scoring by half: 36-29, 35-28
| Pts: Bobby Sharp 14; Rebs: Ryan Nicholas 10; Asts: Korey Thieleke 3 | Pts: Evan Payne & Anthony Ireland 14; Rebs: Alex Osborne 10; Asts: Anthony Ireland 4 |

Gersten Pavilion
Los Angeles, CA
Attendance: 1,822
Referees: Frank Harvey, Daryl Gelinas, Kurt Walker

=== Pepperdine ===
Series History: Portland leads series 56–33
Broadcasters: Al Epstein

TV-32

Jan 18
5:05 PM PST

Recap

Portland Pilots 65, Pepperdine Waves 76
Scoring by half: 34-30, 31-46
| Pts: Kevin Bailey 27; Rebs: Ryan Nicholas 7 Asts: Alec Wintering 6 | Pts: Lamond Murray Jr. 16; Rebs: Stacy Davis 8 Asts: Amadi Udenyi 5 |

Firestone Fieldhouse
Malibu, CA
Attendance: 1,377
Referees: Klaus Endrissat, Tom Spitznagel, Michael Rapp

=== BYU ===
Series History: BYU leads 9–0
Broadcasters: Tom Glasgow & Bill Krueger

ROOT NW

Jan 23
7:00 PM PST

Recap

BYU Cougars 110, Portland Pilots 114 (OT)
Scoring by half: 40-45, 40-35 Overtime: 11-11, 12-12, 7-11
| Pts: Tyler Haws 48; Rebs: Nate Austin 15; Asts: Matt Carlino 9 | Pts: Bobby Sharp & Thomas Van Der Mars 27; Rebs: Thomas Van Der Mars 18; Asts: Kevin Bailey 6 |

Chiles Center
Portland, OR
Attendance: 2,813
Referees: Greg Nixon, Rob Rorke, Scott Brown
