= 2027 West Coast Conference men's basketball tournament =

American college basketball postseason tournament

- Classification: Division I
- Season: 2026–27
- Teams: 10
- Site: Orleans Arena; Paradise, Nevada
- Television: ESPN+, ESPN2, ESPN

2026–27 West Coast Conference men's basketball standings
	Conf.				Overall
Team	W		L	PCT	W		L	PCT
Denver	0	–	0	–	0	–	0	–
Loyola Marymount	0	–	0	–	0	–	0	–
Pacific	0	–	0	–	0	–	0	–
Pepperdine	0	–	0	–	0	–	0	–
Portland	0	–	0	–	0	–	0	–
Saint Mary's	0	–	0	–	0	–	0	–
San Diego	0	–	0	–	0	–	0	–
San Francisco	0	–	0	–	0	–	0	–
Santa Clara	0	–	0	–	0	–	0	–
Seattle	0	–	0	–	0	–	0	–
† 2027 WCC tournament winner Rankings from AP poll

The 2027 West Coast Conference men's basketball Tournament will be the postseason men's basketball tournament for the West Coast Conference for the 2026–27 season. All tournament games will be played at Orleans Arena in the Las Vegas-area community of Paradise, Nevada, from March 5–9, 2027. The winner will receive the conference's automatic bid to the 2027 NCAA tournament.

== Seeds ==
All ten WCC schools will participate in the tournament, seeded by conference record, with a tiebreaker system for identical conference records. The tournament will return to a format previously used from 2014 to 2018. Teams will be seeded by record within the conference, with a tiebreaker system to seed teams with identical conference records. The tiebreakers are to operate in the following order:

1. Head-to-head record
2. Record against the top-seeded team not involved in the tie, going down through the standings until the tie is broken
3. NET rating after the final regular-season conference games on February 27

Seed	School	Conference	Tiebreaker	Tiebreaker 2
1				
2				
3				
4				
5				
6				
7				
8				
9				
10				

== Schedule and results ==
Game	Time	Matchup	Score	Television
First Round – Friday, March 5
1	TBA			ESPN+
2	TBA			ESPN+
Quarterfinals – Sunday, March 7
3	TBA			ESPN/ESPN2/ESPNU/ESPN+
4	TBA			ESPN/ESPN2/ESPNU/ESPN+
5	TBA			ESPN/ESPN2/ESPNU/ESPN+
6	TBA			ESPN/ESPN2/ESPNU/ESPN+
Semifinals – Monday, March 7
7	TBA			ESPN/ESPN2/ESPNU
8	TBA			ESPN/ESPN2/ESPNU
Final – Tuesday, March 8
9	TBA			ESPN/ESPN2
*Game times in PST. Rankings denote tournament seed.

== Bracket ==
First round March 5 ESPN+
8
9
7

Quarterfinals; March 7 ESPN/ESPN2/ESPNU/ESPN+
1
4
5
2
3
6

Semifinals; March 8 ESPN/ESPN2/ESPNU

Championship; March 9 ESPN/ESPN2

* indicates overtime period.
