= 2013–14 Santa Clara Broncos men's basketball team =

American college basketball season

2013–14 Santa Clara Broncos men's basketball
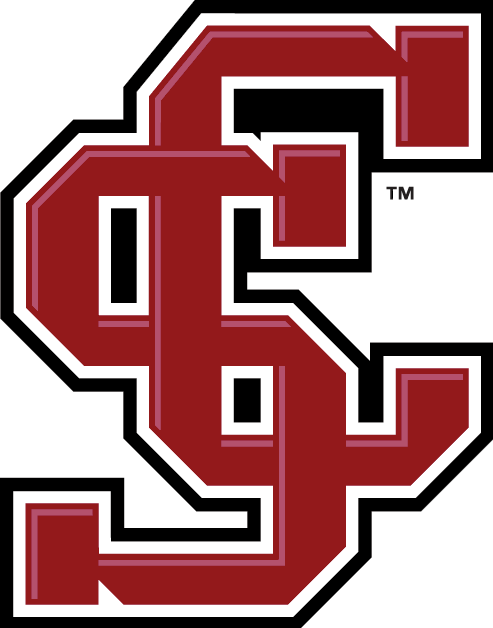
- Conference: West Coast Conference
- Record: 14–19 (6–12 WCC)
- Head coach: Kerry Keating (7th season)
- Assistant coaches: Jesse Pruitt; Sam Scholl; Kyle Schwan
- Home arena: Leavey Center

2013–14 West Coast Conference men's basketball standings
| | Conf. | | | | Overall |
| Team | W | | L | PCT | W | | L | PCT |
|---|---|---|---|---|---|---|---|---|
| Gonzaga † | 15 | – | 3 | .833 | 29 | – | 7 | .806 |
| BYU | 13 | – | 5 | .722 | 23 | – | 12 | .657 |
| San Francisco | 13 | – | 5 | .722 | 21 | – | 12 | .636 |
| Saint Mary's | 11 | – | 7 | .611 | 23 | – | 12 | .657 |
| Pepperdine | 8 | – | 10 | .444 | 15 | – | 16 | .484 |
| San Diego | 7 | – | 11 | .389 | 18 | – | 17 | .514 |
| Portland | 7 | – | 11 | .389 | 15 | – | 16 | .484 |
| Pacific | 6 | – | 12 | .333 | 18 | – | 16 | .529 |
| Santa Clara | 6 | – | 12 | .333 | 14 | – | 19 | .424 |
| Loyola Marymount | 4 | – | 14 | .222 | 13 | – | 19 | .406 |
† Conference tournament winner

The 2013–14 Santa Clara Broncos men's basketball team represented Santa Clara University during the 2013–14 NCAA Division I men's basketball season. It was head coach Kerry Keating's seventh season at Santa Clara. The Broncos played their home games at the Leavey Center and were members of the West Coast Conference. They finished the season 14–19, 6–12 in WCC play to finish in a tie for eighth place. They advanced to the quarterfinals of the WCC tournament where they lost to Gonzaga.

== Before the season ==
=== Departures ===
| Name | Number | Pos. | Height | Weight | Year | Hometown | Notes |
|---|---|---|---|---|---|---|---|
| Kyle Perricone | 4 | G | 6'3" | 195 | Senior | Palo Alto, CA | Graduated |
| Marc Trasolini | 15 | F | 6'9" | 215 | RS Senior | Vancouver, British Columbia, Canada | Graduated |
| Kevin Foster | 21 | G | 6'2" | 219 | Senior | Katy, TX | Graduated; Signed a Professional Contract w/ Beskitas |
| Niyi Harrison | 31 | G | 6'8" | 225 | Senior | Milpitas, CA | Graduated |
| Raymond Cowels III | 42 | G | 6'4" | 215 | Senior | Minneapolis, MN | Graduated |

=== Recruiting ===
Five players joined Santa Clara for the 2013-14 season. Of the five, four are freshman while one transferred from Fresno State. Three of the players joined in the winter while two joined after the spring season.

College recruiting information
| Name | Hometown | School | Height | Weight | Commit date |
|---|---|---|---|---|---|
| Jared Brownridge; G | Aurora, Illinois | Waubonsie Valley | 6 ft 2 in (1.88 m) | 195 lb (88 kg) | Sep 18, 2012 |
| Jared Brownridge; G | Recruit ratings: Scout: Rivals: (66) | | | | |
| Emmanuel Ndumanya; C | Anambra State | Junipero Serra | 6 ft 10 in (2.08 m) | 260 lb (120 kg) | May 22, 2013 |
| Emmanuel Ndumanya; C | Recruit ratings: Scout: Rivals: (NR) | | | | |
| Jarvis Pugh; G | Murphy, Texas | Plano East | 6 ft 6 in (1.98 m) | 190 lb (86 kg) | Oct 8, 2012 |
| Jarvis Pugh; G | Recruit ratings: Scout: Rivals: (NR) | | | | |
| Jalen Richard; G | San Tan Valley, Arizona | Poston Butte | 6 ft 3 in (1.91 m) | 180 lb (82 kg) | Sep 5, 2012 |
| Jalen Richard; G | Recruit ratings: Scout: Rivals: (63) | | | | |
| Jerry Brown; F | Richmond, California | Sacred Heart; Fresno State | 6 ft 7 in (2.01 m) | 220 lb (100 kg) | May 22, 2013 |
| Jerry Brown; F | Recruit ratings: Scout: Rivals: (70) | | | | |
Overall recruit ranking: Scout: nr Rivals: nr ESPN: nr
Note: In many cases, Scout, Rivals, 247Sports, On3, and ESPN may conflict in their listings of height and weight.; In these cases, the average was taken. ESPN grades are on a 100-point scale.; Sources: "Santa Clara 2013 Basketball Commitments". Rivals.; "2013 Santa Clara Basketball Commits". Scout.; "ESPN". ESPN.; "Scout.com Team Recruiting Rankings". Scout.; "2013 Team Ranking". Rivals.

== Roster ==
2013–14 Santa Clara Broncos men's basketball team
Players
Coaches

| Pos. | # | Name | Height | Weight | Year | Previous school | Hometown |
|---|---|---|---|---|---|---|---|
| F | 0 | Jerry Brown | 6 ft 7 in (2.01 m) | 220 lb (100 kg) | Sr | Sacred Heart; Fresno State | Richmond, CA |
| G | 3 | Brandon Clark | 6 ft 0 in (1.83 m) | 170 lb (77 kg) | Jr | Merrillville | East Chicago, IN |
| G | 4 | Jarvis Pugh | 6 ft 6 in (1.98 m) | 190 lb (86 kg) | Fr | Plano East | Murphy, TX |
| G | 5 | Jalen Richard | 6 ft 3 in (1.91 m) | 180 lb (82 kg) | Fr | Poston Butte | San Tan Valley, AZ |
| G | 20 | Denzel Johnson | 6 ft 3 in (1.91 m) | 189 lb (86 kg) | Jr | Clovis West | Fresno, CA |
| G | 22 | Julian Clarke | 6 ft 3 in (1.91 m) | 193 lb (88 kg) | Jr | Oakwood Collegiate | Toronto, Ontario, Canada |
| G | 23 | Jared Brownridge | 6 ft 2 in (1.88 m) | 195 lb (88 kg) | Fr | Waubonsie Valley | Aurora, IL |
| G | 24 | Evan Roquemore | 6 ft 3 in (1.91 m) | 175 lb (79 kg) | Sr | Foothill | Henderson, NV |
| F | 25 | John McArthur | 6 ft 9 in (2.06 m) | 228 lb (103 kg) | Sr | De La Salle | Danville, CA |
| C | 35 | Robert Garrett | 7 ft 0 in (2.13 m) | 270 lb (122 kg) | Jr | Sacramento | Vallejo, CA |
| F | 43 | Nate Kratch | 6 ft 6 in (1.98 m) | 213 lb (97 kg) | RS Fr | Watertown-Mayer | Watertown, MN |
| F | 44 | Yannick Atanga | 6 ft 8 in (2.03 m) | 220 lb (100 kg) | Jr | Besant Hill of Happy Valley (Ojai, CA) | Yaoundé, Cameroon |
| C | 50 | Emmanuel Ndumanya | 6 ft 10 in (2.08 m) | 260 lb (118 kg) | Fr | Junípero Serra | Anambra, Nigeria |

Head coach

- Kerry Keating (Seton Hall)

Assistant coach(es)

- Jesse Pruitt (UC Davis)
- Sam Scholl (San Diego)
- Kyle Schwan (Northern State)

Legend

- (C) Team captain
- (S) Suspended
- (I) Ineligible
- (W) Walk-on
- Injured
- Current redshirt

== Schedule and results ==
| Date time, TV | Opponent | Result | Record | Site city, state |
Exhibition
| 11/02/2013*; 7:00 pm, Bronco TV | San Diego Christian | W 89–60 | - | Leavey Center; Santa Clara, CA |
Regular season
| 11/08/2013*; 7:00 pm, Bronco TV | Bethesda | W 84–39 | 1–0 | Leavey Center; Santa Clara, CA |
| 11/12/2013*; 8:00 pm, Bronco TV | San Jose State | W 89–77 | 2–0 | Leavey Center; Santa Clara, CA |
| 11/16/2013*; 3:00 pm, BigWest.tv | at Cal State Fullerton | L 73–86 | 2–1 | Titan Gym; Fullerton, CA |
| 11/22/2013*; 3:00 pm, ESPN3 | at Notre Dame | L 69–84 | 2–2 | Purcell Pavilion; Notre Dame, IN |
| 11/29/2013*; 8:15 pm, Bronco TV | North Dakota State; Cable Car Classic | L 85–91 | 2–3 | Leavey Center; Santa Clara, CA |
| 11/30/2013*; 6:00 pm, Bronco TV | Rice; Cable Car Classic Consolation | L 66–67 | 2–4 | Leavey Center; Santa Clara, CA |
| 12/05/2013*; 7:00 pm | at Cal State Bakersfield | W 60–42 | 3–4 | Rabobank Arena; Bakersfield, CA |
| 12/07/2013*; 7:00 pm, Watch Big Sky | at Cal Poly | L 53–64 | 3–5 | Mott Gym; San Luis Obispo, CA |
| 12/14/2013*; 7:00 pm, Bronco TV | La Sierra | W 97–61 | 4–5 | Leavey Center; Santa Clara, CA |
| 12/16/2013*; 7:00 pm, Bronco TV | Radford; Las Vegas Classic | W 75–62 | 5–5 | Leavey Center; Santa Clara, CA |
| 12/18/2013*; 5:00 pm, Bronco TV | Sacred Heart; Las Vegas Classic | W 70–61 | 6–5 | Leavey Center; Santa Clara, CA |
| 12/22/2013*; 7:30 pm | vs. UNLV; Las Vegas Classic Semifinals | L 71–92 | 6–6 | Orleans Arena; Paradise, NV |
| 12/23/2013*; 5:00 pm, CBSSN | vs. South Florida; Las Vegas Classic | W 66–65 | 7–6 | Orleans Arena; Paradise, NV |
| 12/28/2013; 5:00 pm, ESPNU | at No. 24 Gonzaga | L 60–74 | 7–7 (0–1) | McCarthey Athletic Center; Spokane, WA |
| 12/30/2013; 3:00 pm, TheW.tv | at Portland | W 76–68 | 8–7 (1–1) | Chiles Center; Portland, OR |
| 01/02/2014; 7;00 PM, TheW.tv | Pepperdine | L 61–70 | 8–8 (1–2) | Leavey Center; Santa Clara, CA |
| 01/04/2014; 3:00 pm, CSN BAY | Loyola Marymount | W 86–81 ^{OT} | 9–8 (2–2) | Leavey Center; Santa Clara, CA |
| 01/09/2014; 7:00 pm, CSN BAY | at Saint Mary's | W 57–55 | 10–8 (3–2) | McKeon Pavilion; Moraga, CA |
| 01/11/2014; 1:00 pm, CSN CA | at Pacific | L 68–80 | 10–9 (3–3) | Alex G. Spanos Center; Stockton, CA |
| 01/16/2014; 7:00 pm, Bronco TV | San Diego | L 66–69 | 10–10 (3–4) | Leavey Center; Santa Clara, CA |
| 01/18/2014; 7:00 pm, CSN CA | BYU | L 81–91 | 10–11 (3–5) | Leavey Center; Santa Clara, CA |
| 01/25/2014; 5:00 pm, CSN BAY | at San Francisco | L 66–75 | 10–12 (3–6) | War Memorial Gymnasium; San Francisco, CA |
| 01/29/2014; 8:00 pm, CSN BAY | Gonzaga | L 52–54 | 10–13 (3–7) | Leavey Center; Santa Clara, CA |
| 02/01/2014; 7:00 pm, TheW.tv | Portland | L 64–76 | 10–14 (3–8) | Leavey Center; Santa Clara, CA |
| 02/06/2014; 8:00 pm, ESPNU | at BYU | L 76–89 | 10–15 (3–9) | Marriott Center; Provo, UT |
| 02/08/2014; 8:00 pm, CSNCA | at San Diego | W 69–63 | 11–15 (4–9) | Jenny Craig Pavilion; San Diego, CA |
| 02/15/2014; 8:00 pm, ESPNU | San Francisco | L 63–69 | 11–16 (4–10) | Leavey Center; Santa Clara, CA |
| 02/20/2014; 7:00 pm, TheW.tv | Pacific | W 70–50 | 12–16 (5–10) | Leavey Center; Santa Clara, CA |
| 02/22/2014; 1:00 pm, CSN CA | Saint Mary's | L 54–76 | 12–17 (5–11) | Leavey Center; Santa Clara, CA |
| 02/27/2014; 8:00 pm, CSN BAY | at Loyola Marymount | L 71–75 | 12–18 (5–12) | Gersten Pavilion; Los Angeles, CA |
| 03/01/2014; 5:00 pm, TheW.tv or TV-32 | at Pepperdine | W 86–78 | 13–18 (6–12) | Firestone Fieldhouse; Malibu, CA |
2014 West Coast tournament
| 03/06/2014; 8:30 pm, BYUtv | vs. Pacific; First round | W 81–64 | 14–18 | Orleans Arena; Paradise, NV |
| 03/08/2014; 6:00 pm, ESPN2 | vs. Gonzaga; Quarterfinals | L 75–77 | 14–19 | Orleans Arena; Paradise, NV |
*Non-conference game. ^{#}Rankings from AP Poll. (#) Tournament seedings in parentheses. All times are in Pacific Time.

== Game summaries ==
=== Exhibition: San Diego Christian ===
Nov 2
7:00 PM PDT

Recap

San Diego Christian Hawks 60, Santa Clara Broncos 89
Scoring by half: 28-49, 32-40
| Pts: Andy Saharan 18; Rebs: Brian Simmons 9 Asts: Josh Richardson, Brian Simmons & Trevor English 2 | Pts: Brandon Clark 17; Rebs: Yannick Atanga 17; Asts: Brandon Clark 7 |

Leavey Center
Santa Clara, CA
Attendance: 1,060
Referees: Horace Shields, Dennis Flannery, Rob Rorke

=== Bethesda ===
Series History: First Meeting

Nov 8
4:37 PM PST

Recap

Bethesda Flames 39, Santa Clara Broncos 84
Scoring by half: 19-42, 20-42
| Pts: Alan Marsh 10; Rebs: Alan Marsh 5 Asts: Blake Harris 3 | Pts: Jared Brownridge 25; Rebs: Yannick Atanga 9 Asts: Jared Brownridge 6 |

Leavey Center
Santa Clara, CA
Attendance: 1,087
Referees: Jeffery Kent, Justin Shamion, Toby Doolittle

=== San Jose State ===
Series History: Santa Clara leads 74-29

Nov 12
8:15 PM PST

Recap

San Jose State Spartans 77, Santa Clara Broncos 89
Scoring by half: 28-42, 49-47
| Pts: Jaleel Williams 20; Rebs: Chris Cunningham 7 Asts: DJ Brown 6 | Pts: Brandon Clark 23; Rebs: Jerry Brown & Yannick Atanga 10; Asts: Brandon Clark 5 |

Leavey Center
Santa Clara, CA
Attendance: 1,456
Referees: Frank Harvey, Ronald Brokenbrough, James Giron

=== Cal State Fullerton ===
Series History: Santa Clara leads 1-0

Nov 16
3:05 PM PST

Recap

Santa Clara Broncos 73, Cal State Fullerton Titans 86
Scoring by half: 34-40, 39-46
| Pts: Brandon Clark 23; Rebs: Jerry Brown 7 Asts: Brandon Clark & Jalen Richard 3 | Pts: Alex Harris 19; Rebs: Steve McClellan 8 Asts: Michael Williams 5 |

Titan Gym
Fullerton, CA
Attendance: 1,154
Referees: Brett Nansel, Klaus Endrissat, Kurt Walker

=== Notre Dame ===
Series History: Notre Dame leads 1-0
Announcers: Mike Couzens and Darrin Horn

ESPN3

Nov 22
9:00 PM EST

Recap

Santa Clara Broncos 69, Notre Dame Fighting Irish 84
Scoring by half: 35-41, 34-43
| Pts: Brandon Clark 21; Rebs: Yannick Atanga 5 Asts: Brandon Clark 6 | Pts: Jerian Grant 20; Rebs: Austin Burgett 10; Asts: Eric Atkins & Jerian Grant 5 |

Purcell Pavilion
Notre Dame, IN
Attendance: 9,149
Referees: Gary Maxwell, Alan Spalnhour, Raymond E Jr Styons

=== Cable Car Classic: North Dakota State ===
Series History: First Meeting

Nov 29
8:15 PM PST

Recap

North Dakota State Bison 91, Santa Clara Broncos 85
Scoring by half: 50-39, 41-46
| Pts: Taylor Braun 21; Rebs: Lawrence Alexander & Taylor Braun 8 Asts: Taylor Braun 4 | Pts: Brandon Clark 32; Rebs: Jerry Brown & Nate Kratch 5 Asts: Evan Roquemore 7 |

Leavey Center
Santa Clara, CA
Attendance: 850
Referees: Horace Shields, Kurt Walker, Tom Nally

=== Cable Car Classic: Rice ===
Series History: Series even 1-1

Nov 22
6:00 PM PST

Recap

Rice Owls 67, Santa Clara Broncos 66
Scoring by half: 39-29, 28-37
| Pts: Sean Obi 17; Rebs: Sean Obi 9 Asts: Marcus Jackson 7 | Pts: Evan Roquemore 17; Rebs: Jerry Brown 9 Asts: Evan Roquemore 4 |

Leavey Center
Santa Clara, CA
Attendance: 1,024
Referees: Ronald Brokenbrough, Coban Lopez, Michael Rapp

=== Cal State Bakersfield ===
Series History: Santa Clara leads 3-0

Dec 5
7:05 PM PST

Recap

Santa Clara Broncos 60, Cal State Bakersfield Roadrunners 42
Scoring by half: 23-24, 37-18
| Pts: Evan Roquemore 12; Rebs: Jerry Brown & Robert Garrett 8 Asts: Jared Brownridge 5 | Pts: Brandon Barnes 9 Rebs: Erik Kinney 7 Asts: Stefon Johnson & Tyrell Corbin 3 |

Rabobank Arena
Bakersfield, CA
Attendance: 820
Referees: Michael Irving, Verne Harris, Justin Van Duyne

=== Cal Poly ===
Series History: Santa Clara leads 4-1

Dec 7
7:30 PM PST

Recap

Santa Clara Broncos 53, Cal Poly Mustangs 64
Scoring by half: 23-29, 30-35
| Pts: Brandon Clark & Evan Roquemore 12; Rebs: Jerry Brown 9 Asts: Brandon Clark 5 | Pts: Dave Nwaba 21; Rebs: Chris Eversley 15; Asts: Maliik Love 4 |

Mott Gym
San Luis Obispo, CA
Attendance: 2,016
Referees: Justin Van Duyne, Mark Fulton, Rob Rorke

=== La Sierra ===
Series History: First Meeting

Dec 14
7:00 PM PST

Recap

La Sierra Golden Eagles 61, Santa Clara Broncos 97
Scoring by half: 24-39, 37-58
| Pts: Daveon Woods 22; Rebs: Lance Jones 8 Asts: Wolfgang Wood 5 | Pts: Jared Brownridge 24; Rebs: Jerry Brown, Evan Roquemore, & Denzel Johnson 6 Asts: Jared Brownridge 7 |

Leavey Center
Santa Clara, CA
Attendance: 532
Referees: Ronald Brokenbrough, Coban Lopez, Courtney Holmes

=== Las Vegas Classic: Radford ===
Series History: First Meeting

Dec 16
7:00 PM PST

Recap

Radford Highlanders 62, Santa Clara Broncos 75
Scoring by half: 27-33, 35-42
| Pts: RJ Price 16; Rebs: Jalen Carethers 7 Asts: Rashun Davis 4 | Pts: Jared Brownridge 21; Rebs: Nate Kratch 10; Asts: Evan Roquemore 5 |

Leavey Center
Santa Clara, CA
Attendance: 919
Referees: Ken Ditty, Tony Padilla, Scott Harris

=== Las Vegas Classic: Sacred Heart ===
Series History: First Meeting

Dec 18
8:15 PM PST

Recap

Sacred Heart Pioneers 61, Santa Clara Broncos 70
Scoring by half: 31-27, 30-43
| Pts: Evan Kelley 20; Rebs: Phil Gaetano & Louis Montes 6 Asts: Evan Kelley & Phil Gaetano 5 | Pts: Brandon Clark 30; Rebs: John McArthur 12; Asts: Brandon Clark 5 |

Leavey Center
Santa Clara, CA
Attendance: 992
Referees: Glen Mayberry, Nate Harris, Casey McClellan

=== Las Vegas Classic: UNLV ===
Series History: UNLV leads 9-7

Dec 22
7:30 PM PST

Recap

Santa Clara Broncos 71, UNLV Runnin' Rebels 92
Scoring by half: 38-47, 33-45
| Pts: Jared Brownridge 22; Rebs: Jerry Brown & John McArthur 5 Asts: Evan Roquemore 3 | Pts: Roscoe Smith 15; Rebs: Khem Birch 8 Asts: Kevin Olekaibe & Deville Smith 5 |

Orleans Arena
Paradise, NV
Attendance: 4,376
Referees: Jeff Malham, Jon Stigliano, Toby Martinez

=== Las Vegas Classic: South Florida ===
Broadcasters: Brent Stover, Steve Lappas, and Doug Gottlieb

CBSSN

Dec 23
5:00 PM PST

Recap

South Florida Bulls 65, Santa Clara Broncos 66
Scoring by half: 25-28, 40-38
| Pts: Victor Rudd 19; Rebs: John Egbunu 11; Asts: Corey Allen Jr. 4 | Pts: Brandon Clark 12; Rebs: Jerry Brown 11; Asts: Evan Roquemore 5 |

Orleans Arena
Paradise, NV
Attendance: 1,347
Referees: Rod Dixon, Pat Boeh, Toby Martinez

=== Gonzaga ===
Series History: Gonzaga leads series 49-30
Broadcasters: Roxy Bernstein and Miles Simon

ESPNU

Dec 28
5:00 pm PST

Recap

Santa Clara Broncos 60, Gonzaga Bulldogs 74
Scoring by half: 26-31, 34-43
| Pts: Brandon Clark 22; Rebs: Yannick Atanga 9 Asts: Evan Roquemore 3 | Pts: David Stockton 21; Rebs: Przemek Karnowski 8 Asts: Kyle Dranginis 4 |

McCarthey Athletic Center
Spokane, WA
Attendance: 6,000
Referees: Glen Mayberry, Klaus Andrissat, Dennis Flannery

=== Portland ===
Series History: Santa Clara leads 57-30
Broadcasters: Roxy Bernstein and Kris Johnson

TheW.tv

Dec 30
3:00 PM PST

Recap

Santa Clara Broncos 76, Portland Pilots 68
Scoring by half: 37-31, 39-37
| Pts: Brandon Clark, Evan Roquemore, & Jared Brownridge 20; Rebs: Jerry Brown, Jared Brownridge, Evan Roquemore, & Yannick Atanga 4 Asts: Brandon Clark & Evan Roquemore 6 | Pts: Thomas Van Der Mars 23; Rebs: Ryan Nicholas 13; Asts: Bryce Pressley 6 |

Chiles Center
Portland, OR
Attendance: 1,479
Referees: Kevin Brill, Greg Nixon, Deldre Carr

=== Pepperdine ===
Series History: Santa Clara leads 76-50
Broadcasters: Rich Cellini, John Stege, and Amanda Blackwell

TheW.tv

Jan 2
5:05 PM PST

Recap

Pepperdine Waves 70, Santa Clara Broncos 61
Scoring by half: 38-33, 32-28
| Pts: Brendan Lane 26; Rebs: Brendan Lane 17; Asts: Jeremy Major 7 | Pts: Jared Brownridge 18; Rebs: Jerry Brown 8 Asts: Jared Brownridge 6 |

Leavey Center
Santa Clara, CA
Attendance: 1,431
Referees: Tony Padilla, James Giron, Kurt Walker

=== Loyola Marymount ===
Series History: Santa Clara leads 83-57
Broadcasters: Glen Kuiper and Dan Belluomini

CSN BAY

Jan 4
3:00 PM PST

Recap

Loyola Marymount Lions 81, Santa Clara Broncos 86 (OT)
Scoring by half: 35-35, 35-35 Overtime: 11-16
| Pts: Anthony Ireland 34; Rebs: Alex Osborne 10; Asts: Anthony Ireland 7 | Pts: Jared Brownridge 29; Rebs: John McArthur 8 Asts: Evan Roquemore 5 |

Leavey Center
Santa Clara, CA
Attendance: 1,746
Referees: Michael Schyphers, Deron White, Horace Shields

=== Saint Mary's ===
Series History: Santa Clara leads 136-82
Broadcasters: Barry Tompkins and Dan Belluomini

CSN BAY

Jan 9
7:00 PM PST

Recap

Santa Clara Broncos 57, Saint Mary's Gaels 55
Scoring by half: 20-29, 37-26
| Pts: Jared Brownridge 23; Rebs: Jared Brownridge 6 Asts: Brandon Clark & Evan Roquemore 2 | Pts: Brad Waldow 17; Rebs: Brad Waldow 14; Asts: Stephen Holt 5 |

McKeon Pavilion
Moraga, CA
Attendance: 3,500
Referees: Michael Reed, Ken Ditty, Mark Cook

=== Pacific ===
Series History: Santa Clara leads 89-41
Broadcasters: Barry Tompkins and Jarron Collins

CSNCA

Jan 11
1:05 PM PST

Recap

Santa Clara Broncos 68, Pacific Tigers 80
Scoring by half: 29-33, 39-47
| Pts: Brandon Clark 20; Rebs: John McArthur 6 Asts: Brandon Clark 4 | Pts: Sama Taku 19; Rebs: Tony Gill 7 Asts: Sama Taku 4 |

Alex G. Spanos Center
Stockton, CA
Attendance: 1,816
Referees: Scott Brown, Rob Rorke, Nate Harris

=== San Diego ===
Series History: Santa Clara leads 41-33

Jan 16
7:00 PM PST

Recap

San Diego Toreros 69, Santa Clara Broncos 66
Scoring by half: 28-32, 41-34
| Pts: Duda Sanadze 25; Rebs: Brett Bailey & Dennis Kramer 5 Asts: Jito Kok 3 | Pts: Brandon Clark 21; Rebs: Evan Roquemore 5 Asts: John McArthur 4 |

Leavey Center
Santa Clara, CA
Attendance: 1,564
Referees: Tommy Nunez, Dennis Flannery, Klaus Endrissat

=== BYU ===
Broadcasters: Glen Kuiper and Dan Belluomini
Series History: BYU leads 19-5

CSNCA

Jan 18
PST

Recap

BYU Cougars 91, Santa Clara Broncos 81
Scoring by half: 47-30, 44-51
| Pts: Kyle Collinsworth 18; Rebs: Kyle Collinsworth & Nate Austin 7 Asts: Matt Carlino 9 | Pts: Jared Brownridge 30; Rebs: Yannick Atanga 6 Asts: Brandon Clark 7 |

Leavey Center
Santa Clara, CA
Attendance: 2,560
Referees: Michael Greenstein, Horace Shields, Ronald Brokenbrough
