= 2014 West Coast Conference men's basketball tournament =

- 2014 WCC Tournament from Las Vegas
- Classification: Division I
- Season: 2013–14
- Teams: 10
- Site: Orleans Arena; Paradise, NV
- Finals site: Orleans Arena; Paradise, NV
- Champions: Gonzaga (13th title)
- Winning coach: Mark Few (11th title)
- MVP: Sam Dower (Gonzaga)
- Television: ESPN/ESPN2/BYUtv

2013–14 West Coast Conference men's basketball standings
	Conf.				Overall
Team	W		L	PCT	W		L	PCT
Gonzaga †	15	–	3	.833	29	–	7	.806
BYU	13	–	5	.722	23	–	12	.657
San Francisco	13	–	5	.722	21	–	12	.636
Saint Mary's	11	–	7	.611	23	–	12	.657
Pepperdine	8	–	10	.444	15	–	16	.484
San Diego	7	–	11	.389	18	–	17	.514
Portland	7	–	11	.389	15	–	16	.484
Pacific	6	–	12	.333	18	–	16	.529
Santa Clara	6	–	12	.333	14	–	19	.424
Loyola Marymount	4	–	14	.222	13	–	19	.406
† Conference tournament winner

The 2014 West Coast Conference men's basketball tournament was held March 6–11, 2014 at the Orleans Arena in Paradise, Nevada. This was the sixth consecutive year the WCC Tournament took place in Vegas after the WCC and the Orleans reached a 3-year extension to keep the tournament in Vegas through 2016.

== Format ==
With the addition of the University of the Pacific, the WCC went to a more traditional tournament format. Under the new format, the top 6 seeds earned a bye out of the first round while the 7 seed plays the 10 seed and the 8 seed plays the 9 seed. The first round, which began on a Thursday, aired on BYUtv.

The 8 teams that advanced to the second round had a bye on Friday while the women's second round was completed. The men's second round became the quarterfinal round. It took place on Saturday and had the 1 seed playing the winner of the 8/9 game and the 2 seed playing the winner of the 7/10 game. The quarterfinals also featured the 3 seed playing the 6 seed, and the 4 seed playing the 5 seed. The two evening quarterfinal games aired on ESPN2 while the afternoon games aired on BYUtv.

Continuing a normal procedure for WCC men's and women's tournaments, no games were played on Sunday. All conference members were founded as faith-based schools, and all but Pacific are financially supported by churches. Most significantly, BYU has a strict policy against Sunday play. Instead, the four remaining teams had an off day and prepared for the semifinals on Monday.

The semifinals took place on Monday with the winner of 1/8/9 playing the winner of 4/5 and the winner of 2/7/10 playing the winner of 3/6. One of the semifinals aired on ESPN2, and the other aired on ESPN.

The championship took place on Tuesday and featured the semifinal winners. As in recent years, the championship game was broadcast on ESPN and nationally on the radio by Westwood One.

== Seeds ==
WCC Tiebreaker procedures are as follows:

1. Head-to-head
2. Better record against a higher seed
3. Higher RPI

Seed	School	Conference	Overall*	Tiebreaker
1	Gonzaga	15–3	25–6	
2	BYU	13–5	21–10	2–0 vs. USF
3	San Francisco	13–5	20–10	0–2 vs. BYU
4	Saint Mary's	11–7	21–10	
5	Pepperdine	8–10	15–15	
6	San Diego	7–11	16–15	2–0 vs. Portland
7	Portland	7–11	15–15	0–2 vs. San Diego
8	Pacific	6–12	15–14	1–1 vs. BYU
9	Santa Clara	6–12	13–18	0–2 vs. BYU
10	Loyola Marymount	4–14	12–18	

* Overall record at end of regular season

== Schedule ==
Session	Game	Time*	Matchup^{#}
First round – Thursday, March 6
1	1	6:00 pm	#7 Portland vs. #10 Loyola Marymount
1	2	8:00 pm	#8 Pacific vs. #9 Santa Clara
Quarterfinals – Saturday, March 8
2	3	12:00 pm	#3 San Francisco vs. #6 San Diego
2	4	2:00 pm	#2 BYU vs. #10 Loyola Marymount
3	5	6:00 pm	#1 Gonzaga vs. #9 Santa Clara
3	6	8:00 pm	#4 Saint Mary's vs. #5 Pepperdine
Semifinals – Monday, March 10
4	7	6:00 pm	#1 Gonzaga vs. #4 Saint Mary's
4	8	8:00 pm	#2 BYU vs. #3 San Francisco
Championship – Tuesday, March 11
5	9	6:00 pm	#1 Gonzaga vs. #2 BYU
*Game times in PT. #-Rankings denote tournament seeding.

== Bracket ==
First round Thursday, March 6 BYUtv
8	Pacific	64
9	Santa Clara	81
7	Portland	64
10	Loyola Marymount	67

Quarterfinals; Saturday, March 8 BYUtv (afternoon); ESPN2 (evening)
1	Gonzaga	77
9	Santa Clara	75
4	Saint Mary's	80
5	Pepperdine	69
2	BYU	85
10	Loyola Marymount	74
3	San Francisco	69
6	San Diego	60

Semifinals; Monday, March 10; ESPN (early); ESPN2 (late)
1	Gonzaga	70
4	Saint Mary's	54
2	BYU	79
3	San Francisco	77^{OT}

Championship; Tuesday, March 11; ESPN
1	Gonzaga	75
2	BYU	64

== Game summaries ==
=== Portland vs. Loyola Marymount ===
Series History: Loyola Marymount leads 47-44
Broadcasters: Dave McCann and Blaine Fowler

BYUtv

Mar 6
6:00 pm PST

Recap

Loyola Marymount Lions 67, Portland Pilots 64
Scoring by half: 31-30, 36-34
Pts: Evan Payne 19; Rebs: Nick Stover & Gabe Levin 7 Asts: Anthony Ireland 6	Pts: Bobby Sharp & Thomas Van Der Mars 18; Rebs: Ryan Nicholas 11; Asts: David Carr 4

Orleans Arena
Paradise, NV
Attendance: 7,688
Referees: Mike Greenstein, Kevin Brill, Ken Ditty

=== Pacific vs. Santa Clara ===
Series History: Santa Clara leads 90-42
Broadcasters: Dave McCann and Blaine Fowler

BYUtv

Mar 6
8:00 pm PST

Recap

Santa Clara Broncos 81, Pacific Tigers 64
Scoring by half: 34-29, 47-35
Pts: Jared Brownridge 20; Rebs: Jerry Brown 8 Asts: Brandon Clark 3	Pts: Sama Taku 16; Rebs: T. J. Wallace 7 Asts: Andrew Bock & David Taylor 2

Orleans Arena
Paradise, NV
Attendance: 7,688
Referees: Tommy Nunez, Greg Nixon, Deldre Carr

=== San Francisco vs. San Diego ===
Series History: San Francisco leads 39-34
Broadcasters: Dave McCann and Blaine Fowler

BYUtv

Mar 8
12:00 pm PST

Recap

San Diego Toreros 60, San Francisco Dons 69
Scoring by half: 23-33, 37-36
Pts: Dennis Kramer 19; Rebs: Christopher Anderson 9 Asts: Christopher Anderson 6	Pts: Avry Holmes 19; Rebs: Cole Dickerson 8 Asts: Matt Glover & Cole Dickerson 3

Orleans Arena
Paradise, NV
Attendance: 7,688
Referees: Tom Spitznagel, Dennis Flannery, Ron Brokenbrough

=== BYU vs. Loyola Marymount ===
Series History: BYU leads 5-4
Broadcasters: Dave McCann and Blaine Fowler

BYUtv

Mar 8
2:00 pm PST

Recap

Loyola Marymount Lions 74, BYU Cougars 85
Scoring by half: 36-43, 38-42
Pts: Anthony Ireland 19; Rebs: Gabe Levin 10; Asts: Anthony Ireland 4	Pts: Kyle Collinsworth 23; Rebs: Kyle Collinsworth 16; Asts: Anson Winder 3

Orleans Arena
Paradise, NV
Attendance: 7,688
Referees: Frank Harvey, Bruce Hicks, Horace Shields

=== Gonzaga vs. Santa Clara ===
Series History: Gonzaga leads 50-32
Broadcasters: Dave Flemming and Sean Farnham

ESPN2

Mar 8
6:00 pm PST

Recap

Santa Clara Broncos 75, Gonzaga Bulldogs 77
Scoring by half: 37-31, 38-46
Pts: Jared Brownridge 24; Rebs: Jerry Brown 7 Asts: Brandon Clark, Jared Brownridge, & Nate Kratch 3	Pts: Sam Dower 23; Rebs: Przemek Karnowski 12; Asts: David Stockton 4

Orleans Arena
Paradise, NV
Attendance: N/A
Referees: Daryl Gelinas, Marc Beasley, Rob Rorke

=== Saint Mary's vs. Pepperdine ===
Series History: Pepperdine leads 68-62
Broadcasters: Dave Flemming and Sean Farnham

ESPN2

Mar 8
8:00 pm PST

Recap

Pepperdine Waves 69, Saint Mary's Gaels 80
Scoring by half: 28-41, 41-39
Pts: Amadi Udenyi 13; Rebs: Stacy Davis 5 Asts: Brendan Lane 4	Pts: Brad Waldow 21; Rebs: Brad Waldow 8 Asts: Beau Levesque 4

Orleans Arena
Paradise, NV
Attendance: 7,898
Referees: Klaus Endrissat, James Giron, Mark Cook

=== Gonzaga vs. Saint Mary's ===
Series History: Gonzaga leads 59-27
Broadcasters: Dave Flemming and Sean Farnham

ESPN

Mar 10
6:00 pm PST

Saint Mary's Gaels 54, Gonzaga Bulldogs 70
Scoring by half: 20-31, 34-39
Pts: Brad Waldow 14; Rebs: Stephen Holt & Kerry Carter 6 Asts: James Walker III & Eividas Petrulis 2	Pts: David Stockton 21; Rebs: Sam Dower. 9 Asts: David Stockton 4

Orleans Arena
Paradise, NV
Attendance: 7,168
Referees: Kevin Brill, Frank Harvey, Ken Ditty

=== BYU vs. San Francisco ===
Series History: BYU leads 10-7
Broadcasters: Dave Flemming and Sean Farnham

ESPN2

Mar 10
8:00 pm PST

San Francisco Dons 77, BYU Cougars 79 (OT)
Scoring by half: 37-35, 27-29 Overtime: 13-15
Pts: Cole Dickerson 20; Rebs: Cole Dickerson 10; Asts: Avry Holmes 7	Pts: Tyler Haws 24; Rebs: Kyle Collinsworth 12; Asts: Eric Mika, Tyler Haws, & Kyle Collinsworth 2

Orleans Arena
Paradise, NV
Attendance: 7,168
Referees: Tommy Nunez, Greg Nixon, Deldre Carr

=== WCC Championship: BYU vs. Gonzaga ===
Series History: Gonzaga leads 6-3
Broadcasters: Dave Flemming and Sean Farnham

ESPN

Mar 11
6:00 pm PST

BYU Cougars 64, Gonzaga Bulldogs 75
Scoring by half: 27-44, 37-31
Pts: Tyler Haws 24; Rebs: Eric Mika 10; Asts: Matt Carlino 2	Pts: Sam Dower 20; Rebs: Sam Dower 13; Asts: David Stockton 7

Orleans Arena
Paradise, NV
Attendance: 7,898
Referees: Mike Greenstein, Mike Reed, Michael Irving

== All-tournament team ==
Tournament MVP in bold.

Name	School	Pos.	Year	Ht.	Hometown
**Sam Dower**	Gonzaga	C	Senior	6-9	Minneapolis, Minnesota
Kyle Collinsworth	BYU	G	Sophomore	6-6	Provo, Utah
Cole Dickerson	San Francisco	F	Senior	6-7	Federal Way, Washington
Tyler Haws	BYU	G	Junior	6-5	Alpine, Utah
David Stockton	Gonzaga	G	Senior	5-11	Spokane, Washington

== See also ==
- 2013-14 NCAA Division I men's basketball season
- West Coast Conference men's basketball tournament
- 2013–14 West Coast Conference men's basketball season
- 2014 West Coast Conference women's basketball tournament
