= Sam Dower =

American basketball player

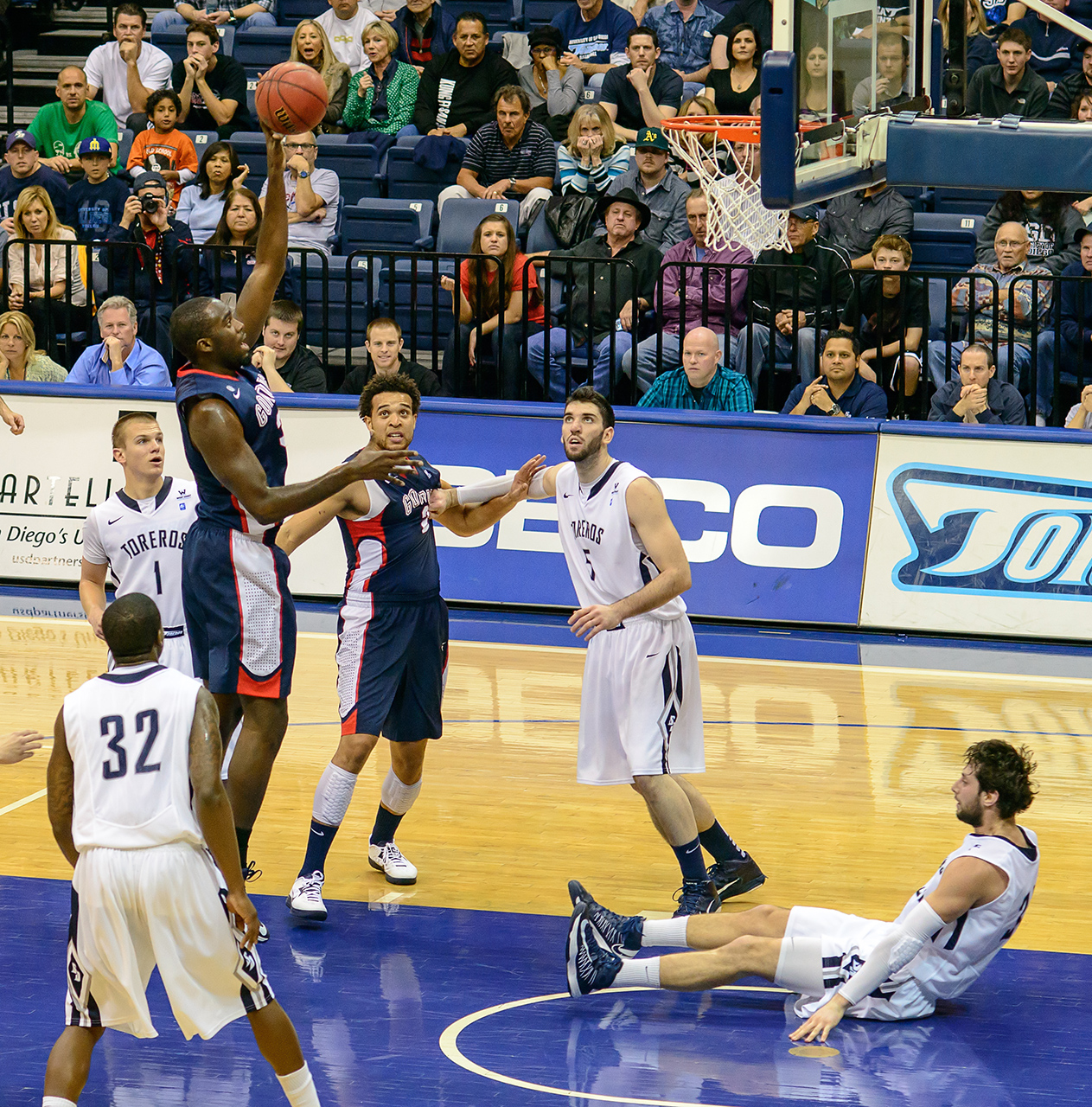
- Sam Dower hook shot

MKS Dąbrowa Górnicza
- Position: Power forward / center
- League: Polish Basketball League

Personal information
- Born: November 6, 1990 (age 36) Brooklyn Park, Minnesota
- Listed height: 6 ft 9 in (2.06 m)
- Listed weight: 255 lb (116 kg)

Career information
- High school: Osseo (Minneapolis, Minnesota)
- College: Gonzaga (2009–2014)
- NBA draft: 2014: undrafted
- Playing career: 2014–present

Career history
- 2014: SO Maritime Boulogne
- 2014–2015: BK Valmiera
- 2015–2016: MKS Dąbrowa Górnicza
- 2018–present: MKS Dąbrowa Górnicza

Career highlights
- First-team All-WCC (2014); WCC All-Freshman Team (2012)

Sam Dower Jr. (born November 6, 1990) is an American basketball player. Standing 6'9, he mainly plays the power forward position. He played college basketball for Gonzaga and currently plays for Polish pro basketball team MKS Dąbrowa Górnicza.

== College career ==
Dower committed to Gonzaga over scholarship offers from Marquette, Minnesota, California and George Mason. He redshirted his first year. In his first collegiate game, he scored 19 points in 17 minutes against Southern. He was later named to the WCC All-Freshman Team. As a sophomore, he recorded his first double-double with 20 points and 10 rebounds in a win against Xavier. As a junior, he started seven of the first nine games until Kelly Olynyk took his place at the power forward position. After three successful seasons, in which he was Gonzaga's top scorer off the bench, Dower shouldered the responsibilities as a senior and shared a role with Kevin Pangos as Gonzaga's top scoring option. He sustained an injury as a senior against Kansas State on December 21, 2013, and missed three games. Nonetheless, Dower led the Bulldogs in scoring with roughly 15 points per game. He admitted to being a reluctant rebounder at times, since he focused on scoring. Dower's dominant senior campaign earned him All-WCC First team honors. Dower then led Gonzaga to a berth into the NCAA Tournament, earning MVP honors in the WCC tournament.

== Professional career ==
On July 21, 2014, Dower signed with Boulogne-sur-Mer, in France, in the first division. In November 2014, he announced that he quit the team, citing personal reasons.

On December 9, 2014, Dower signed with BK Valmiera, a team based in Valmiera, Latvia, in the LBL and Baltic League.

On August 17, 2018, Dower signed with MKS Dąbrowa Górnicza of the Polish side. He returned to action after missing two seasons with a knee injury.

== Statistics ==
=== College ===
Legend
GP	Games played	GS	Games started	MPG	Minutes per game
FG%	Field goal percentage	3P%	3-point field goal percentage	FT%	Free throw percentage
RPG	Rebounds per game	APG	Assists per game	SPG	Steals per game
BPG	Blocks per game	PPG	Points per game	**Bold**	Career high

Year	Team	GP	GS	MPG	FG%	3P%	FT%	RPG	APG	SPG	BPG	PPG
2010–11	Gonzaga Bulldogs	35	0	14.1	57.5	25.0	81.2	3.26	0.34	0.40	0.74	7.60
2011–12	Gonzaga Bulldogs	33	0	18.1	53.8	40.0	76.7	3.73	0.58	0.52	0.30	8.30
2012–13	Gonzaga Bulldogs	35	8	16.0	55.8	28.6	75.4	2.69	0.31	0.46	0.43	6.91
2013–14	Gonzaga Bulldogs	34	31	27.0	57.1	31.6	82.5	7.21	1.09	0.44	0.71	14.38
Total		137	39	18.8	56.2	32.8	79.7	4.2	0.58	0.45	0.55	9.28
