= Bill Krueger =

American baseball player (born 1957)

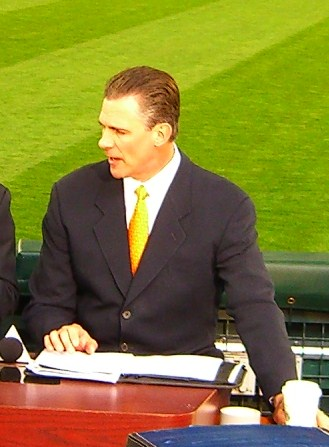
- Pitcher
- Born: April 24, 1957 (age 69); Waukegan, Illinois, U.S.
- Batted: Left Threw: Left

MLB debut
- April 10, 1983, for the Oakland Athletics

Last MLB appearance
- August 13, 1995, for the Seattle Mariners

MLB statistics
- Win–loss record: 68–66
- Earned run average: 4.35
- Strikeouts: 639
- Stats at Baseball Reference

Teams
- Oakland Athletics (1983–1987); Los Angeles Dodgers (1987–1988); Milwaukee Brewers (1989–1990); Seattle Mariners (1991); Minnesota Twins (1992); Montreal Expos (1992); Detroit Tigers (1993–1994); San Diego Padres (1994–1995); Seattle Mariners (1995)

William Culp Krueger (born April 24, 1958) is an American former Major League Baseball pitcher, who played from 1983 to 1995 for eight teams. He pitched for the Oakland A's, Los Angeles Dodgers, Milwaukee Brewers, Seattle Mariners (twice), Minnesota Twins, Montreal Expos, Detroit Tigers, and San Diego Padres.

== Early career ==
After graduating from McMinnville High School in 1975, McMinnville, Oregon, Krueger began classes at the University of Portland on a basketball scholarship, where he was a four year starter and shared the backcourt with future NBA player Darwin Cook. Teaming with All-Americans Darwin Cook, Rick Raivio and Jose Slaughter, the Pilots averaged 18 wins a season his last 3 years there and beat two teams that ranked #1 in the country (San Francisco in 1978 and Oregon State in 1979). Krueger, a three year captain, received the Thomas A. Fagan Award after his senior year.

He began playing 1st base for the Pilots' baseball team in his sophomore year in 1977. A three-year starter for the Pilots, Krueger was the team's most valuable player in 1977–78. In 1979–80, the Pilots set a school record for wins in a season. Six Pilots players from that team were drafted into MLB.

In 1980, Krueger was signed by the Oakland Athletics on July 12 as an undrafted amateur free agent and assigned to the Medford A's of the short-season single-A Northwest League despite only pitching 4 innings in college. Although he went winless for Medford in seven starts that year, he struck out 48 batters, recorded a complete game, and a save. He continued to make his way through the A's minor league system for the next two years, being called up to Double-A West Haven in 1981. In 1982, Krueger had a breakout season in West Haven, going 15–9 with a 2.83 earned run average with 167 strikeouts in 181 innings pitched. The West Haven club won the Eastern League Championship and Krueger made the AA All-Star Team.

== Professional career ==
Krueger made his major league debut on April 10, 1983, as the A's starter for the sixth game of the season. Facing the California Angels, Krueger pitched 7 innings and gave up 4 runs in the Oakland Coliseum. Although Angels Brian Downing singled against him to lead off the game, Krueger got veteran right fielder Juan Beníquez to hit into a 4–6–3 double play. Krueger went 7–6 in 16 starts for the A's in 1983, before an elbow injury ended his season. Before being traded to the Dodgers midway through the 1987 season, Krueger posted a 27–31 record with a 4.69 earned run average.

Krueger saw action in only 3 games in two seasons for the Dodgers, and spent the majority of the 1987 and 1988 seasons with the Albuquerque Dukes, the Dodgers Triple A affiliate. Krueger pitched a no-hitter for the Dukes in 1987 versus the Phoenix Firebirds and helped the Dukes win the Pacific Coast League Championship. In 1988, he had his best season as a pro, going 15–5 and leading the Pacific Coast League in wins, earned run average, and shutouts. He also had success at the plate, hitting .285 with 2 HR's and 6 RBI's in limited at bats. Krueger was traded again to the Pittsburgh Pirates in late 1988. The Pirates released him during spring training of 1989, and Krueger then signed with the Milwaukee Brewers 10 days later. He played in Milwaukee for only two seasons, performing well as both a starter and a reliever. He strung together 19 2/3 straight scoreless innings during the 1989 season. Krueger signed as a free agent by the Seattle Mariners after the end of the 1990 season.

Krueger enjoyed what was arguably one of the best statistical years of his professional career in the Mariners rotation that year by reaching new personal bests in wins (11), strikeouts (91), and earned run average (3.60). Krueger also pitched in a June 7 showdown with his former Brewers ballclub, pitching over six innings while allowing only one run and striking out 6. Krueger was named the American League Pitcher of the Month in July 1991.

Over the last 4 seasons of his career, Krueger played for five different teams in the National and American leagues. Krueger won 10 games for the Minnesota Twins during the 1992 season, setting career high of innings pitched (200). He also was named American League Pitcher of the Month in April of that season. Krueger was traded to Montreal, where he spent 60 days before free agency whisked him to Detroit to play for the Tigers. He again set a new season-low in earned run average (3.40) while appearing in 32 games. After being released from the Tigers mid-season in 1994, Krueger tried to revive his career in San Diego, where he pitched for the Padres until the strike in 1994. Krueger started the '95 season with the Padres but was released in May of that season and was then signed with the Mariners again in July 1995. An interesting footnote, Krueger finished with a .400 career batting average.

Krueger won his last game as a major leaguer on August 6 in the same place he started his career; the Oakland Coliseum. Against the A's that day, the 37-year-old pitched over 5 innings and allowed only one run. He was kept off Seattle's '95 postseason roster. Krueger retired from pro baseball in the spring of 1996 after failing to make the Chicago Cubs roster.

== Post-retirement ==
After his retirement in 1996, Krueger went into broadcasting. He covered both college basketball and professional baseball and is presently the senior baseball analyst for Root Sports Northwest, covering the Seattle Mariners. He was joined at the network in 2007 by former M's teammate Mike Blowers. Krueger later worked as Director of Individual Philanthropy for NW Center. After 13 years as a financial advisor, Krueger returned to wealth management running business development for Coldstream in 2016.

With his wife Jo, Krueger is a past co-president of the Cure Autism Now Northwest chapter, now merged with Autism Speaks. They were successful in making the NW Chapter the country's first chapter to raise $1 million. They have publicly told the story of raising their daughter Chanel, who has autism.

In 2012, Krueger experienced a sudden cardiac arrest at the Redmond Pro Sports Club, where four employees worked together to assist in saving his life. Krueger actively speaks out about the importance of heart health.
