= Rich Cellini =

Sports announcer

- Born: Richard Cellini; October 25, 1970 (age 55); San Francisco, California, U.S.
- Education: California State University, Fresno (BA, MA); University of New Mexico (PhD)
- Occupation: sportscaster

Richard Cellini (born October 25, 1970) is a play-by-play announcer and a professor at the University of San Francisco. He began broadcasting in 1998 and has covered a wide range of sports including football, baseball, basketball, softball and water polo.

== Biography ==
A seasoned sportscaster, Cellini currently does play-by-play for the Pac-12 Networks. He previously covered college sports for several networks, including Fox Sports, ESPN, ESPN 2, ESPNU and the Mountain West Sports Network. He has also been the voice of NFL football, notably the Arizona Cardinals, San Diego Chargers and San Francisco 49ers in the preseason and NFL Europe. He has worked alongside a wide range of analysts — Glenn Parker, Keno Davis, Mark Rypien, Craig Ehlo and Jason Garrett, among many others.

Cellini also serves as a professor at the University of San Francisco. He teaches Leadership and Critical Thinking and the Internship in Sport Management for the university's Sport Management Master's Program.

== Education ==
Cellini received a Doctor of Philosophy degree in Sports Administration from the University of New Mexico in 1997. His dissertation was titled “Television’s Coverage of Professional Football: Information vs. Entertainment”. Prior to earning his Ph.D., Cellini attended California State University, Fresno, where he obtained both a Bachelor of Arts and a Master of Arts in Communication.

== Personal life ==
Born at Kaiser on Geary Street in San Francisco, Cellini grew up in nearby Pine Grove, California. His father, Harvey, was raised in San Francisco's North Beach neighborhood, where he worked as a longshoreman. His mother Jeannette, who is a twin, also grew up in the city. Cellini serves as a professor in the Master's Program in Sport Management at the University of San Francisco.

Cellini graduated from Amador High School in Sutter Creek, California in 1988
