= Cole Dickerson =

American basketball player (born 1991)

No. 25 – Egis Körmend
- Position: Small forward
- League: NB I/A

Personal information
- Born: October 19, 1991 (age 35) Federal Way, Washington
- Listed height: 6 ft 7 in (2.01 m)
- Listed weight: 230 lb (104 kg)

Career information
- High school: Federal Way (Federal Way, Washington)
- College: San Francisco (2010–2014)
- NBA draft: 2014: undrafted
- Playing career: 2014–present

Career history
- 2014–2015: Den Helder Kings
- 2015: Kobrat
- 2015–2016: Egis Körmend
- 2016: Mornar Bar
- 2017–present: Egis Körmend

Career highlights
- Hungarian Cup champion (2016); 2× First-team All-WCC (2013, 2014)

Cole Dickerson (born October 19, 1991) is an American professional basketball player for Egis Körmend of the Hungarian League.

== Professional career ==
On August 2, 2016, Dickerson signed with Montenegrin club KK Mornar Bar. On December 9, 2016, he left Mornar after averaging 9.6 points and 3.6 rebounds per game in ten ABA League games.

On February 22, 2017, Dickerson returned to Körmend.

== Honors ==
Egis Körmend

- Magyar Kupa: 2016
