= 2013–14 Montana State Bobcats men's basketball team =

American college basketball season

2013–14 Montana State Bobcats men's basketball
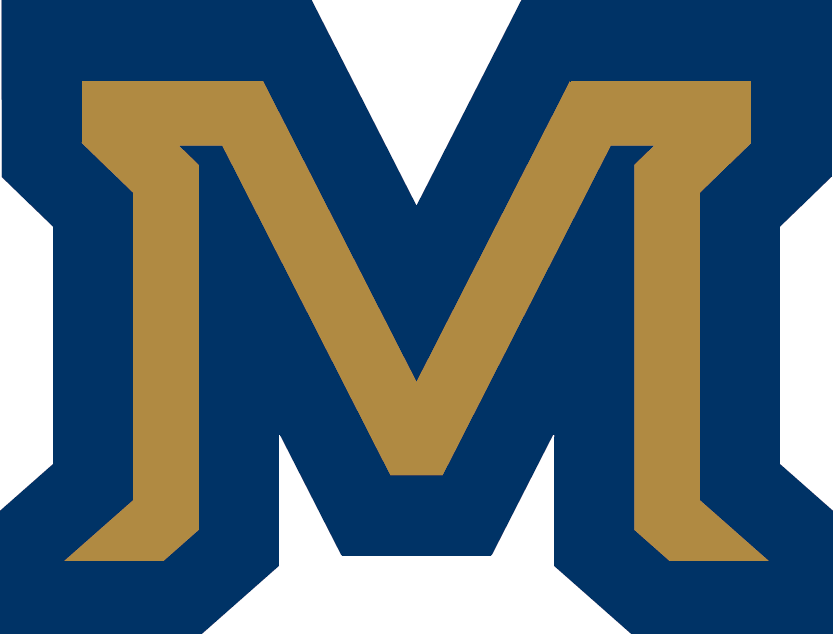
- Conference: Big Sky Conference
- Record: 14–17 (9–11 Big Sky)
- Head coach: Brad Huse (8th season)
- Assistant coaches: Shawn Dirden; Justin Wetzel; Chris Haslam
- Home arena: Worthington Arena

2013–14 Big Sky men's basketball standings
	Conf.				Overall
Team	W		L	PCT	W		L	PCT
Weber State †	14	–	6	.700	19	–	12	.613
Montana	12	–	8	.600	17	–	13	.567
North Dakota	12	–	8	.600	17	–	17	.500
Northern Arizona	12	–	8	.600	15	–	17	.469
Northern Colorado	11	–	9	.550	18	–	14	.563
Portland State	11	–	9	.550	17	–	15	.531
Eastern Washington	10	–	10	.500	15	–	16	.484
Sacramento State	10	–	10	.500	14	–	16	.467
Montana State	9	–	11	.450	14	–	17	.452
Idaho State	8	–	12	.400	11	–	18	.379
Southern Utah	1	–	19	.050	2	–	27	.069
† Conference tournament winner

The 2013–14 Montana State Bobcats men's basketball team represented Montana State University during the 2013–14 NCAA Division I men's basketball season. The Bobcats, led by eighth year head coach Brad Huse, played their home games at Worthington Arena and were members of the Big Sky Conference. They finished the season 14–17, 9–11 in Big Sky play to finish in ninth place. They failed to qualify for the Big Sky Conference tournament.

On March 18, head coach Brad Huse resigned after posting a record of 107–133 in eight seasons.

== Roster ==
Number	Name	Position	Height	Weight	Year	Hometown
0	Flavien Davis	Forward	6–5	225	Senior	Milwaukee, Wisconsin
1	Stephan Holm	Guard	6–3	175	Freshman	Riverton, Utah
2	Blake Brumwell	Center	6–7	250	Junior	Big Sandy, Montana
3	Michael Dison	Guard	5–9	160	Junior	Houston, Texas
5	Antonio Biglow	Guard	6–0	165	Senior	Los Angeles, California
11	Paul Egwuonwu	Center	6–9	235	Senior	Boise, Idaho
13	Terrell Brown	Forward	6–4	200	Sophomore	Colorado Springs, Colorado
20	Ryan Shannon	Forward	6–8	225	Freshman	Marysville, Washington
22	Marcus Colbert	Guard	5–11	180	Sophomore	Post Falls, Idaho
23	Vance Wentz	Guard	6–4	175	Freshman	Leawood, Kansas
24	Eric Norman	Forward	6–9	220	Junior	San Diego, California
30	Eric Norman	Forward	6–9	220	Junior	San Diego, California
32	Calen Coleman	Forward	6–4	200	Senior	Bakersfield, California
34	Danny Robison	Forward	6–8	225	Sophomore	Billings, Montana

== Schedule ==
Date time, TV	Opponent	Result	Record	Site (attendance) city, state
Exhibition
11/03/2013*; 2:00 pm	Dickinson State	W 88–63		Worthington Arena (1,192); Bozeman, MT
Regular Season
11/09/2013*; 4:30 pm	Cal State Fullerton	L 55–84	0–1	Worthington Arena (2,046); Bozeman, MT
11/16/2013*; 4:15 pm	at UC Riverside	L 67–72	0–2	UC Riverside Student Recreation Center (2,355); Riverside, CA
11/21/2013*; 3:30 pm	vs. Cal State Northridge; Central Michigan Tournament	L 73–74	0–3	McGuirk Arena (1,252); Mount Pleasant, MI
11/22/2013*; 6:00 pm	at Central Michigan; Central Michigan Tournament	W 59–54	1–3	McGuirk Arena (1,539); Mount Pleasant, MI
11/23/2013*; 3:30 pm	vs. Austin Peay; Central Michigan Tournament	L 72–78	1–4	McGuirk Arena (1,575); Mount Pleasant, MI
11/26/2013*; 7:00 pm	Cal State Northridge	W 77–62	2–4	Worthington Arena (1,945); Bozeman, MT
11/30/2013*; 7:00 pm	at Wyoming	L 54–79	2–5	Arena-Auditorium (4,631); Laramie, WY
12/07/2013*; 7:00 pm	Walla Walla	W 109–54	3–5	Worthington Arena (1,938); Bozeman, MT
12/15/2013*; 2:00 pm	at Portland	W 72–69	4–5	Chiles Center (1,043); Portland, OR
12/19/2013*; 7:00 pm	Southwestern Christian	W 109–79	5–5	Worthington Arena (1,523); Bozeman, MT
12/23/2013*; 7:00 pm	at UTEP	L 55–70	5–6	Don Haskins Center (6,875); El Paso, TX
01/02/2014; 7:00 pm	Sacramento State	W 70–55	6–6 (1–0)	Worthington Arena (2,159); Bozeman, MT
01/04/2014; 7:00 pm	Northern Arizona	W 68–66	7–6 (2–0)	Worthington Arena (2,476); Bozeman, MT
01/09/2014; 8:00 pm	at Portland State	W 79–76	8–6 (3–0)	Stott Center (761); Portland, OR
01/11/2014; 3:00 pm	at Eastern Washington	L 72–77	8–7 (3–1)	Reese Court (1,004); Cheney, Washington
01/16/2014; 7:00 pm	Northern Colorado	W 70–55	9–7 (4–1)	Worthington Arena (2,609); Bozeman, MT
01/18/2014; 7:00 pm	North Dakota	L 69–72	9–8 (4–2)	Worthington Arena (2,685); Bozeman, MT
01/23/2014; 7:00 pm	at Weber State	L 57–86	9–9 (4–3)	Dee Events Center (7,358); Ogden, UT
01/25/2014; 7:00 pm	at Idaho State	L 64–69	9–10 (4–4)	Reed Gym (2,118); Pocatello, ID
02/01/2014; 7:00 pm	at Southern Utah	W 54–52	10–10 (5–4)	Centrum Arena (1,543); Cedar City, UT
02/03/2014; 7:00 pm	Montana	L 66–70	10–11 (5–5)	Worthington Arena (3,424); Bozeman, MT
02/06/2014; 7:00 pm	Eastern Washington	L 50–79	10–12 (5–6)	Worthington Arena (1,949); Bozeman, MT
02/08/2014; 7:00 pm	Portland State	W 69–64	11–12 (6–6)	Worthington Arena (2,206); Bozeman, MT
02/13/2014; 7:00 pm	at North Dakota	W 78–70	12–12 (7–6)	Betty Engelstad Sioux Center (1,669); Grand Forks, ND
02/15/2014; 7:00 pm, ALT	at Northern Colorado	L 73–83	12–13 (7–7)	Butler–Hancock Sports Pavilion; Greenley, CO
02/20/2014; 7:00 pm	Idaho State	W 66–60	13–13 (8–7)	Worthington Arena (2,046); Bozeman, MT
02/22/2014; 7:00 pm	Weber State	L 68–86	13–14 (8–8)	Worthington Arena (2,437); Bozeman, MT
02/27/2014; 7:00 pm	Southern Utah	W 77–72 ^{OT}	14–14 (9–8)	Worthington Arena (2,184); Bozeman, MT
03/03/2014; 7:00 pm	at Montana	L 50–53	14–15 (9–9)	Dahlberg Arena (4,606); Missoula, MT
03/06/2014; 7:00 pm	at Northern Arizona	L 48–61	14–16 (9–10)	Walkup Skydome (1,441); Fkagstaff
03/08/2014; 8:00 pm	at Sacramento State	L 59–84	14–17 (9–11)	Colberg Court (1,001); Sacramento, CA
*Non-conference game. ^{#}Rankings from AP Poll. (#) Tournament seedings in parentheses. All times are in Mountain Time.
