= 2013–14 Northern Colorado Bears men's basketball team =

American college basketball season

2013–14 Northern Colorado Bears men's basketball
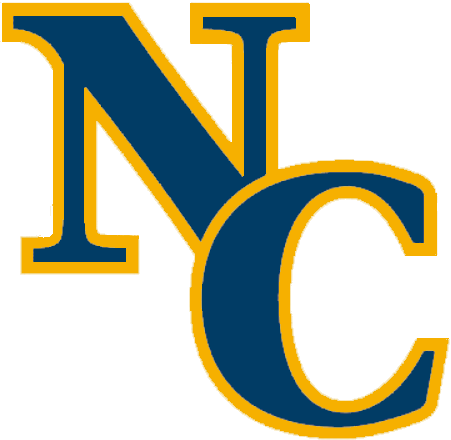

CIT, First round (vacated)
- Conference: Big Sky Conference
- Record: 0-0 (18 wins, 14 losses vacated) (0-0 (11 wins, 9 losses vacated) Big Sky)
- Head coach: B. J. Hill (4th season)
- Assistant coaches: Will Hensley; Joel Davidson; Austin Hansen
- Home arena: Butler–Hancock Sports Pavilion

2013–14 Big Sky men's basketball standings
| | Conf. | | | | Overall |
| Team | W | | L | PCT | W | | L | PCT |
|---|---|---|---|---|---|---|---|---|
| Weber State † | 14 | – | 6 | .700 | 19 | – | 12 | .613 |
| Montana | 12 | – | 8 | .600 | 17 | – | 13 | .567 |
| North Dakota | 12 | – | 8 | .600 | 17 | – | 17 | .500 |
| Northern Arizona | 12 | – | 8 | .600 | 15 | – | 17 | .469 |
| Northern Colorado | 11 | – | 9 | .550 | 18 | – | 14 | .563 |
| Portland State | 11 | – | 9 | .550 | 17 | – | 15 | .531 |
| Eastern Washington | 10 | – | 10 | .500 | 15 | – | 16 | .484 |
| Sacramento State | 10 | – | 10 | .500 | 14 | – | 16 | .467 |
| Montana State | 9 | – | 11 | .450 | 14 | – | 17 | .452 |
| Idaho State | 8 | – | 12 | .400 | 11 | – | 18 | .379 |
| Southern Utah | 1 | – | 19 | .050 | 2 | – | 27 | .069 |
† Conference tournament winner

The 2013–14 Northern Colorado Bears men's basketball team represented the University of Northern Colorado during the 2013–14 NCAA Division I men's basketball season. The Bears were led by fourth year head coach B. J. Hill and played their home games at the Butler–Hancock Sports Pavilion. They were a member of the Big Sky Conference. They finished the season 18–14, 11–9 in Big Sky play to finish in a tie for fifth place. They advanced to the semifinals of the Big Sky Conference tournament where they lost to Weber State. They were invited to the CollegeInsdier.com Tournament where they lost in the first round to Texas A&M–Corpus Christi.

== Roster ==
| Number | Name | Position | Height | Weight | Year | Hometown |
|---|---|---|---|---|---|---|
| 0 | Corey Spence | Guard | 5–9 | 175 | Junior | Baltimore, Maryland |
| 1 | Derrick Barden | Forward | 6–5 | 225 | Senior | Detroit, Michigan |
| 2 | Xzaivier James | Guard | 5–11 | 175 | Senior | Greeley, Colorado |
| 3 | Jordan Wilson | Guard | 5–7 | 155 | Freshman | Los Angeles, California |
| 4 | Cameron Michael | Guard | 6–5 | 185 | Sophomore | Loveland, Colorado |
| 5 | Tevin Svihovec | Guard | 6–2 | 190 | Junior | Kingwood, Texas |
| 10 | Cody McDavis | Forward | 6–8 | 230 | Sophomore | Phoenix, Arizona |
| 13 | Dominique Lee | Forward | 6–5 | 215 | Junior | Oakland, California |
| 15 | Tate Unruh | Guard | 6–4 | 180 | Senior | Branson, Missouri |
| 21 | Brendan Keane | Center | 6–9 | 245 | Junior | Oakland, California |
| 22 | Tim Huskisson | Forward | 6–5 | 210 | Junior | Willard, Missouri |
| 23 | Collin Sanger | Forward | 6–5 | 200 | Freshman | Sterling, Colorado |
| 24 | Anthony Johnson | Guard | 6–2 | 190 | Freshman | Indianapolis, Indiana |
| 30 | Jon'te Dotson | Guard | 6–3 | 185 | Freshman | Denver, Colorado |
| 33 | Jeremy Verhagen | Forward | 6–10 | 195 | Freshman | Florence, Arizona |
| 34 | Connor Osborne | Center | 6–9 | 260 | Senior | Littleton, Colorado |

== Schedule ==
| Date time, TV | Opponent | Result | Record | Site (attendance) city, state |
Regular season
| 11/08/2013*; 7:00 pm, FSKC | at Kansas State | W 60–58 | 1–0 | Bramlage Coliseum (12,004); Manhattan, KS |
| 11/12/2013*; 7:00 pm | Colorado Christian | W 98–74 | 2–0 | Butler–Hancock Sports Pavilion (1,516); Greeley, CO |
| 11/20/2013*; 7:00 pm, ALT | at New Mexico State; Colorado State Challenge | L 63–67 | 2–1 | Pan American Center (5,444); Las Cruces, NM |
| 11/22/2013*; 7:00 pm | at Colorado State; Colorado State Challenge | L 65–72 | 2–2 | Moby Arena (4,473); Fort Collins, CO |
| 11/30/2013*; 7:05 pm | Bethune-Cookman; Colorado State Challenge | W 65–60 | 3–2 | Butler–Hancock Sports Pavilion (929); Greeley, CO |
| 12/01/2013*; 7:05 pm | Prairie View A&M; Colorado State Challenge | W 87–70 | 4–2 | Butler–Hancock Sports Pavilion (203); Greeley, CO |
| 12/10/2013*; 7:05 pm | Colorado College | W 96–57 | 5–2 | Butler–Hancock Sports Pavilion (N/A); Greeley, CO |
| 12/16/2013*; 7:05 pm | UC Riverside | W 63–60 | 6–2 | Butler–Hancock Sports Pavilion (952); Greeley, CO |
| 12/22/2013*; 4:00 pm | at Wyoming | L 59–72 | 6–3 | Arena-Auditorium (4,513); Laramie, WY |
| 12/29/2013; 7:05 pm | North Dakota | W 84–66 | 7–3 (1–0) | Butler–Hancock Sports Pavilion (912); Greeley, CO |
| 01/04/2014; 7:00 pm | Southern Utah | W 91–55 | 8–3 (2–0) | Butler–Hancock Sports Pavilion (987); Greeley, CO |
| 01/09/2014; 7:05 pm, ALT | Weber State | W 70–51 | 9–3 (3–0) | Butler–Hancock Sports Pavilion (1,102); Greeley, CO |
| 01/11/2014; 7:05 pm | at Idaho State | W 82–75 | 10–3 (4–0) | Butler–Hancock Sports Pavilion (1,453); Greeley, CO |
| 01/16/2014; 7:00 pm | at Montana State | L 55–70 | 10–4 (4–1) | Worthington Arena (2,609); Bozeman, MT |
| 01/18/2014; 7:00 pm | at Montana | W 84–73 | 11–4 (5–1) | Dahlberg Arena (4,106); Missoula, MT |
| 01/23/2014; 7:05 pm | Northern Arizona | W 87–72 | 12–4 (6–1) | Butler–Hancock Sports Pavilion (1,601); Greeley, CO |
| 01/25/2014; 7:05 pm | Sacramento State | W 72–62 | 13–4 (7–1) | Butler–Hancock Sports Pavilion (1,271); Greeley, CO |
| 01/30/2014; 8:00 pm | at Portland State | L 57–80 | 13–5 (7–2) | Stott Center (1,500); Portland, OR |
| 02/01/2014; 3:05 pm | at Eastern Washington | L 90–94 ^{OT} | 13–6 (7–3) | Reese Court (1,440); Cheney, WA |
| 02/06/2014; 7:00 pm | at Idaho State | L 70–73 | 13–7 (7–4) | Holt Arena (1,498); Pocatello, ID |
| 02/08/2014; 7:00 pm | at Weber State | L 65–79 | 13–8 (7–5) | Dee Events Center (8,151); Ogden, UT |
| 02/13/2014; 7:05 pm, ALT | Montana | W 89–86 ^{OT} | 14–8 (8–5) | Butler–Hancock Sports Pavilion (2,453); Greeley, CO |
| 02/15/2014; 7:05 pm, ALT | Montana State | W 83–73 | 15–8 (9–5) | Butler–Hancock Sports Pavilion (1,929); Greeley, CO |
| 02/20/2014; 6:30 pm, FSAZ | at Northern Arizona | W 74–59 | 16–8 (10–5) | Walkup Skydome (1,164); Flagstaff, AZ |
| 02/22/2014; 8:05 pm | at Sacramento State | L 58–79 | 16–9 (10–6) | Colberg Court (877); Sacramento, CA |
| 02/27/2014; 7:05 pm | Eastern Washington | L 66–80 | 16–10 (10–7) | Butler–Hancock Sports Pavilion (1,786); Greeley, CO |
| 03/01/2014; 7:05 pm | Portland State | L 68–77 | 16–11 (10–8) | Butler–Hancock Sports Pavilion (1,630); Greeley, CO |
| 03/04/2014; 6:00 pm | at North Dakota | L 90–94 | 16–12 (10–9) | Betty Engelstad Sioux Center (1,767); Grand Forks, ND |
| 03/08/2014; 5:00 pm | at Southern Utah | W 77–52 | 17–12 (11–9) | Centrum Arena (888); Cedar City, UT |
Big Sky tournament
| 03/13/2014; 4:30 pm | Northern Arizona; Quarterfinals | W 62–60 | 18–12 | Dee Events Center (N/A); Ogden, UT |
| 03/14/2014; 7:00 pm | at Weber State; Semifinals | L 63–66 ^{OT} | 18–13 | Dee Events Center (5,228); Ogden, UT |
CIT
| 03/19/2014*; 7:00 pm | Texas A&M–Corpus Christi; First round | L 71–82 | 18–14 | Butler–Hancock Sports Pavilion (953); Greeley, CO |
*Non-conference game. ^{#}Rankings from AP Poll. (#) Tournament seedings in parentheses. All times are in Mountain Time.
