= 2013–14 Idaho State Bengals men's basketball team =

American college basketball season

2013–14 Idaho State Bengals men's basketball
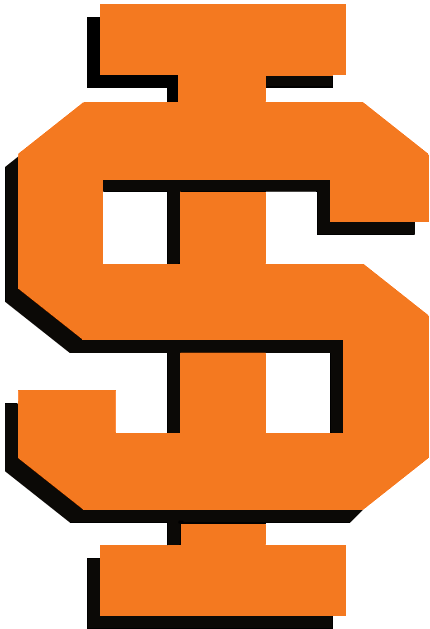
- Conference: Big Sky Conference
- Record: 11–18 (8–12 Big Sky)
- Head coach: Bill Evans (2nd season)
- Assistant coaches: Andy Ward; Jay Collins; Tim Walsh
- Home arena: Reed Gym

2013–14 Big Sky men's basketball standings
	Conf.				Overall
Team	W		L	PCT	W		L	PCT
Weber State †	14	–	6	.700	19	–	12	.613
Montana	12	–	8	.600	17	–	13	.567
North Dakota	12	–	8	.600	17	–	17	.500
Northern Arizona	12	–	8	.600	15	–	17	.469
Northern Colorado	11	–	9	.550	18	–	14	.563
Portland State	11	–	9	.550	17	–	15	.531
Eastern Washington	10	–	10	.500	15	–	16	.484
Sacramento State	10	–	10	.500	14	–	16	.467
Montana State	9	–	11	.450	14	–	17	.452
Idaho State	8	–	12	.400	11	–	18	.379
Southern Utah	1	–	19	.050	2	–	27	.069
† Conference tournament winner

The 2013–14 Idaho State Bengals men's basketball team represented Idaho State University during the 2013–14 NCAA Division I men's basketball season. The Bengals, led by second year head coach Bill Evans, played their home games at Reed Gym and were members of the Big Sky Conference. They finished the season 11–18, 8–12 in Big Sky play to finish in tenth place. They failed to qualify for the Big Sky Conference tournament.

== Roster ==
Number	Name	Position	Height	Weight	Year	Hometown
1	Tomas Sanchez	Guard	6–3	185	Senior	Seattle, Washington
3	Ben Wilson	Guard	6–5	200	Junior	Bardon, Queensland, Australia
5	Jeffrey Solarin	Forward	6–4	210	Junior	Denver, Colorado
10	Evann Hall	Guard	6–4		Sophomore	Thousand Oaks, California
11	Nnamdi Ezenwa	Forward	6–6	204	Senior	El Paso, Texas
12	Ajak Magot	Center	6–11	225	Junior	Tucson, Arizona
13	Scotty Tyler	Forward	6–7	205	Freshman	Grafton, Wisconsin
15	Andre' Hatchett	Guard	6–4	185	Senior	Tucson, Arizona
21	Andre Lavik	Forward/Center	6–9	210	Freshman	Žiar nad Hronom, Slovakia
24	Chris Hansen	Guard/Forward	6–4	220	Junior	Fort Collins, Colorado
25	Erik Nakken	Guard	6–3	175	Freshman	Cedar City, Utah
32	Justin Smith	Guard	6–5	175	Freshman	Colorado Springs, Colorado
33	Clint Thomas	Guard	6–1	185	Sophomore	McCall, Idaho
55	Ayibakuro Preh	Center	6–9	218	Senior	Kano, Nigeria

== Schedule ==
Date time, TV	Opponent	Result	Record	Site (attendance) city, state
Exhibition
11/04/2013*; 7:00 pm	Dickinson State	W 97–54		Reed Gym (1,258); Pocatello, ID
Regular season
11/09/2013*; 8:00 pm	Evergreen State	W 99–62	1–0	Reed Gym (1,452); Pocatello, ID
11/15/2013*; 7:00 pm, P12N	at Arizona State	L 60–88	1–1	Wells Fargo Arena (5,899); Tempe, AZ
11/18/2013*; 8:00 pm	at San Francisco	W 93–90 ^{OT}	2–1	War Memorial Gymnasium (1,262); San Francisco, CA
11/23/2013*; 8:00 pm	at Cal State Bakersfield	L 69–71	2–2	Icardo Center (1,334); Bakersfield, CA
12/06/2013*; 7:00 pm	Carroll	W 77–50	3–2	Reed Gym (1,688); Pocatello, ID
12/10/2013*; 7:00 pm, P12N	at Utah	L 66–74	3–3	Jon M. Huntsman Center (8,138); Salt Lake City, UT
12/14/2013*; 2:00 pm, P12N	at Washington	L 66–85	3–4	Alaska Airlines Arena (7,526); Seattle, WA
12/20/2013*; 7:00 pm	vs. Idaho	L 65–69	3–5	CenturyLink Arena (1,987); Boise, ID
12/28/2013*; 7:00 pm	Cal State Bakersfield	L 57–61	3–6	Reed Gym (1,502); Pocatello, ID
01/02/2014; 7:00 pm	Portland State	W 87–76	4–6 (1–0)	Reed Gym (1,809); Pocatello, ID
01/04/2014; 7:00 pm	Eastern Washington	W 83–72	5–6 (2–0)	Reed Gym (1,532); Pocatello, ID
01/09/2014; 6:00 pm	at North Dakota	W 66–62	5–7 (2–1)	Betty Engelstad Sioux Center (1,391); Grand Forks, ND
01/11/2014; 7:00 pm	at Northern Colorado	L 75–82	5–8 (2–2)	Butler–Hancock Sports Pavilion (1,453); Greeley, CO
01/16/2014; 7:00 pm	Southern Utah	W 60–45	6–8 (3–2)	Reed Gym (1,938); Pocatello, ID
01/20/2014; 7:00 pm	at Weber State	L 59–65	6–9 (3–3)	Dee Events Center (6,107); Ogden, UT
01/23/2014; 7:00 pm	Montana	L 54–59	6–10 (3–4)	Reed Gym (1,838); Pocatello, ID
01/25/2014; 7:00 pm	Montana State	W 69–64	7–10 (4–4)	Reed Gym (2,118); Pocatello, ID
01/30/2014; 8:00 pm	at Sacramento State	L 78–84	7–11 (4–5)	Colberg Court (574); Sacramento, CA
02/01/2014; 3:00 pm	at Northern Arizona	L 65–67	7–12 (4–6)	Walkup Skydome (994); Flagstaff, AZ
02/06/2014; 7:00 pm	Northern Colorado	W 73–70	8–12 (5–6)	Reed Gym (1,498); Pocatello, ID
02/08/2014; 7:00 pm	North Dakota	L 75–80	8–13 (5–7)	Reed Gym (2,245); Pocatello, ID
02/15/2014; 5:00 pm	at Southern Utah	W 75–65	9–13 (6–7)	Centrum Arena (1,207); Cedar City, UT
02/17/2014; 7:00 pm	Weber State	W 78–75 ^{OT}	10–13 (7–7)	Reed Gym (2,047); Pocatello, ID
02/20/2014; 7:00 pm	at Montana State	L 60–66	10–14 (7–8)	Worthington Arena (2,046); Bozeman, MT
02/22/2014; 7:00 pm	at Montana	L 61–62	10–15 (7–9)	Dahlberg Arena (4,009); Missoula, MT
02/27/2014; 7:00 pm	Northern Arizona	L 65–66	10–16 (7–10)	Reed Gym (1,585); Pocatello, ID
03/01/2014; 7:00 pm	Sacramento State	W 80–67	11–16 (8–10)	Reed Gym (2,013); Pocatello, ID
03/06/2014; 7:00 pm	at Eastern Washington	L 69–77	11–17 (8–11)	Reese Court (2,004); Cheney, WA
03/08/2014; 8:00 pm	at Portland State	L 74–78	11–18 (8–12)	Stott Center (1,237); Portland, OR
*Non-conference game. ^{#}Rankings from AP Poll. (#) Tournament seedings in parentheses. All times are in Mountain Time.
