= 2013–14 Northern Arizona Lumberjacks men's basketball team =

American college basketball season

2013–14 Northern Arizona Lumberjacks men's basketball
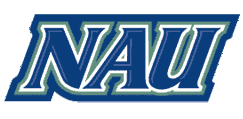
- Conference: Big Sky Conference
- Record: 15–17 (12–8 Big Sky)
- Head coach: Jack Murphy (2nd season)
- Assistant coaches: Matt Dunn; Vic Sfera; Wes Pifer
- Home arena: Walkup Skydome

2013–14 Big Sky men's basketball standings
	Conf.				Overall
Team	W		L	PCT	W		L	PCT
Weber State †	14	–	6	.700	19	–	12	.613
Montana	12	–	8	.600	17	–	13	.567
North Dakota	12	–	8	.600	17	–	17	.500
Northern Arizona	12	–	8	.600	15	–	17	.469
Northern Colorado	11	–	9	.550	18	–	14	.563
Portland State	11	–	9	.550	17	–	15	.531
Eastern Washington	10	–	10	.500	15	–	16	.484
Sacramento State	10	–	10	.500	14	–	16	.467
Montana State	9	–	11	.450	14	–	17	.452
Idaho State	8	–	12	.400	11	–	18	.379
Southern Utah	1	–	19	.050	2	–	27	.069
† Conference tournament winner

The 2013–14 Northern Arizona Lumberjacks men's basketball team represented Northern Arizona University during the 2013–14 NCAA Division I men's basketball season. The Lumberjacks were led by second year head coach Jack Murphy and played their home games at the Walkup Skydome. They were members of the Big Sky Conference. They finished the season 15–17, 12–8 in Big Sky play to finish in a three way tie for second place. They lost in the quarterfinals of the Big Sky Conference tournament to Northern Colorado.

== Roster ==
2013–14 Northern Arizona Lumberjacks men's basketball team
Players
Coaches

Pos.	#	Name	Height	Weight	Year	Previous school	Hometown
G	1	Aaseem Dixon	6 ft 0 in (1.83 m)	185 lb (84 kg)	Jr	Centennial HS/Arizona Western College	Las Vegas, Nevada
G	2	Quinton Upshur	6 ft 5 in (1.96 m)	207 lb (94 kg)	Jr	Booker T. Washington HS/Kilgore College	Norfolk, Virginia
G	3	Christopher Miller	6 ft 3 in (1.91 m)	175 lb (79 kg)	Fr	Greenway HS	Peoria, Arizona
G	4	Kris Yanku	6 ft 4 in (1.93 m)	183 lb (83 kg)	Fr	WH Taft HS	Woodland Hils, California
G	5	Travis Meeker	6 ft 4 in (1.93 m)	185 lb (84 kg)	Fr	Red Mountain HS	Mesa, Arizona
G	10	Chris Heine	6 ft 1 in (1.85 m)	175 lb (79 kg)	Jr	Horizon HS	Phoenix, Arizona
F/C	11	Ako Kaluna	6 ft 7 in (2.01 m)	276 lb (125 kg)	Fr	West Ranch HS	Valencia, California
F	14	Zach Reynolds	6 ft 9 in (2.06 m)	240 lb (109 kg)	Jr	Mt. Zion Academy/Gulf Coast State College	Tampa, Florida
F/C	15	Len Springs	6 ft 10 in (2.08 m)	220 lb (100 kg)	RS Jr	Dorsey HS/El Camino College	Compton, California
G	21	Jaran Hoover	6 ft 3 in (1.91 m)	175 lb (79 kg)	Fr	Prescott HS	Prescott, Arizona
G	23	Jordan Banks	6 ft 1 in (1.85 m)	175 lb (79 kg)	Jr	Kansas City CC	Lenexa, Kansas
F	24	Alex Stecca	6 ft 6 in (1.98 m)	195 lb (88 kg)	RS Fr	Mater Dei HS	Corona del Mar, California
F	32	Gaellan Bewernick	6 ft 6 in (1.98 m)	215 lb (98 kg)	Jr	Manual Arts HS	Los Angeles, California
F	33	Max Jacobsen	6 ft 8 in (2.03 m)	230 lb (104 kg)	Sr	Lake Oswego HS	Lake Oswego, Oregon
F	34	Jordyn Martin	6 ft 7 in (2.01 m)	210 lb (95 kg)	So	Palo Verde HS	Las Vegas, Nevada

Head coach

- Jack Murphy

Assistant coach(es)

- Matt Dunn
- Vic Sfera
- Wes Pifer

Legend

- (C) Team captain
- (S) Suspended
- (I) Ineligible
- (W) Walk-on
- Injured
- Current redshirt

Roster
Last update: 01/16/14

== Schedule ==
Date time, TV	Opponent	Result	Record	Site (attendance) city, state
Exhibition
10/30/2013*; 6:30 pm	Arizona Christian	L 85–92		Rolle Activity Center (N/A); Flagstaff, AZ
Non-conference regular season
11/09/2013*; 6:00 pm	at UTSA	W 74–63	1–0	Convocation Center (1,044); San Antonio, TX
11/11/2013*; 6:00 pm	at Texas Tech	L 68–88	1–1	United Spirit Arena (6,002); Lubbock, TX
11/15/2013*; 9:00 pm, P12N	at USC	L 63–67	1–2	Galen Center (3,821); Los Angeles, CA
11/17/2013*; 5:00 pm	at Loyola Marymount	L 78–90	1–3	Gersten Pavilion (2,119); Los Angeles, CA
11/23/2013*; 3:00 pm, FSAZ	San Diego Christian	W 83–59	2–3	Walkup Skydome (1,048); Flagstaff, AZ
11/29/2013*; 5:30 pm	vs. Cal State Bakersfield; Fresno State Tournament	L 50–61	2–4	Save Mart Center (6,170); Fresno, CA
11/30/2013*; 5:30 pm	vs. Drake; Fresno State Tournament	L 56–76	2–5	Save Mart Center (6,022); Fresno, CA
12/01/2013*; 3:00 pm	at Fresno State; Fresno State Tournament	L 67–71 ^{OT}	2–6	Save Mart Center (5,807); Fresno, CA
12/07/2013*; 5:00 pm, FSAZ	Hawaiʻi	L 66–76	2–7	Walkup Skydome (1,629); Flagstaff, AZ
12/14/2013*; 3:00 pm, FSAZ	Grand Canyon	W 63–61	3–7	Walkup Skydome (2,434); Flagstaff, AZ
12/23/2013*; 8:00 pm, P12N	at No. 1 Arizona	L 44–77	3–8	McKale Center (14,545); Tucson, AZ
Big Sky regular season
01/02/2014; 7:00 pm	at Montana	W 73–65	4–8 (1–0)	Dahlberg Arena (3,883); Missoula, MT
01/04/2014; 7:05 pm	at Montana State	L 66–68	4–9 (1–1)	Worthington Arena (2,476); Bozeman, MT
01/09/2014; 6:30 pm	Sacramento State	W 75–65	5–9 (2–1)	Walkup Skydome (905); Flagstaff, AZ
01/13/2014; 7:00 pm	at Southern Utah	W 70–36	6–9 (3–1)	Centrum Arena (1,609); Cedar City, UT
01/16/2014; 6:30 pm, FSAZ+	Eastern Washington	W 84–65	7–9 (4–1)	Walkup Skydome (1,026); Flagstaff, AZ
01/18/2014; 3:00 pm, FSAZ	Portland State	W 77–56	8–9 (5–1)	Walkup Skydome (1,203); Flagstaff, AZ
01/23/2014; 7:05 pm	at Northern Colorado	L 72–87	8–10 (5–2)	Butler–Hancock Sports Pavilion (1,601); Greeley, CO
01/25/2014; 1:00 pm	at North Dakota	L 68–84	8–11 (5–3)	Betty Engelstad Sioux Center (1,840); Grand Forks, ND
01/30/2014; 6:30 pm	Weber State	L 67–76	8–12 (5–4)	Walkup Skydome (927); Flagstaff, AZ
02/01/2014; 3:00 pm, FSAZ	Idaho State	W 67–65	9–12 (6–4)	Walkup Skydome (994); Flagstaff, AZ
02/06/2013; 8:05 pm	at Sacramento State	L 70–87	9–13 (6–5)	Colberg Court (590); Sacramento, CA
02/08/2014; 6:30 pm	Southern Utah	W 64–57	10–13 (7–5)	Walkup Skydome (N/A); Flagstaff, AZ
02/13/2014; 8:05 pm	at Portland State	W 65–63	11–13 (8–5)	Stott Center (615); Portland, OR
02/15/2014; 3:05 pm	at Eastern Washington	L 65–84	11–14 (8–6)	Reese Court (1,028); Cheney, WA
02/20/2014; 6:30 pm, FSAZ	Northern Colorado	L 59–74	11–15 (8–7)	Walkup Skydome (1,164); Flagstaff, AZ
02/22/2014; 6:30 pm, FSAZ	North Dakota	L 63–75	11–16 (8–8)	Walkup Skydome (1,404); Flagstaff, AZ
02/27/2014; 7:05 pm	at Idaho State	W 66–65	12–16 (9–8)	Reed Gym (1,585); Pocatello, ID
03/01/2014; 7:00 pm	at Weber State	W 73–71 ^{OT}	13–16 (10–8)	Dee Events Center (8,463); Ogden, UT
03/06/2014; 6:30 pm	Montana State	W 61–48	14–16 (11–8)	Walkup Skydome (1,441); Flagstaff, AZ
03/08/2014; 3:00 pm, FSAZ+	Montana	W 67–47	15–16 (12–8)	Walkup Skydome (1,801); Flagstaff, AZ
Big Sky tournament
03/13/2014; 2:30 pm	Northern Colorado; Quarterfinals	L 60–62	15–17	Dee Events Center (N/A); Ogden, UT
*Non-conference game. ^{#}Rankings from AP Poll. (#) Tournament seedings in parentheses. All times are in Mountain Time.
