= 2013–14 Southern Utah Thunderbirds men's basketball team =

American college basketball season

2013–14 Southern Utah Thunderbirds men's basketball
- Conference: Big Sky Conference
- Record: 2–27 (1–19 Big Sky)
- Head coach: Nick Robinson (2nd season)
- Assistant coaches: Drew Allen; Todd Okeson; Chad Bell
- Home arena: Centrum Arena

2013–14 Big Sky men's basketball standings
	Conf.				Overall
Team	W		L	PCT	W		L	PCT
Weber State †	14	–	6	.700	19	–	12	.613
Montana	12	–	8	.600	17	–	13	.567
North Dakota	12	–	8	.600	17	–	17	.500
Northern Arizona	12	–	8	.600	15	–	17	.469
Northern Colorado	11	–	9	.550	18	–	14	.563
Portland State	11	–	9	.550	17	–	15	.531
Eastern Washington	10	–	10	.500	15	–	16	.484
Sacramento State	10	–	10	.500	14	–	16	.467
Montana State	9	–	11	.450	14	–	17	.452
Idaho State	8	–	12	.400	11	–	18	.379
Southern Utah	1	–	19	.050	2	–	27	.069
† Conference tournament winner

The 2013–14 Southern Utah Thunderbirds basketball team represented Southern Utah University during the 2013–14 NCAA Division I men's basketball season. The Thunderbirds were led by second year head coach Nick Robinson and played their home games at the Centrum Arena. They were members of the Big Sky Conference.

The Thunderbirds entered the 2013–14 season with two new assistants. Chad Bell and Yahosh Bonner were hired and acted as new assistant head coach and the Director of Basketball Operations. Bell joined the school from the University of Nevada, Reno while Bonner joined the school from conference rival Northern Colorado University.

They finished the season 2–27, 1–19 in Big Sky play to finish in last place. They failed to qualify for the Big Sky Conference tournament.

== Roster ==
Number	Name	Position	Height	Weight	Year	Hometown
2	McKay Anderson	Guard	6–5	190	Freshman	La Canada, California
4	Trey Kennedy	Guard	6–3	190	Freshman	Las Vegas, Nevada
5	John Marshall	Guard	6–1	185	Freshman	Phoenix, Arizona
10	Thomas Tebbs	Guard	6–3	175	Sophomore	Torrance, California
12	Chris Nsenki	Guard	6–2	180	Junior	Kansas City, Missouri
13	Race Parsons	Guard	6–4	185	Freshman	Monroe, Utah
14	Drake Thomas	Guard	6–0	165	Sophomore	Ovilla, Texas
15	Juwan Major	Guard	6–3	185	Freshman	Las Vegas, Nevada
22	Taylor Jensen	Forward	6–7	187	Freshman	Parker, Colorado
24	Eric Rippetoe	Forward	6–6	215	Junior	Panaca, Nevada
32	Casey Oliverson	Forward	6–8	230	Sophomore	Logan, Utah
34	Cal Hanks	Center	6–11	235	Junior	Logan, Utah
35	A.J. Hess	Guard	6–6	190	Sophomore	Phoenix, Arizona
42	Jaren Jeffery	Center	6–8	210	Senior	Delta, Utah
44	Peter Barrus	Center	6–10	210	Freshman	Salt Lake City, Utah
50	Jayson Cheesman	Center	6–11	250	Senior	Orem, Utah

== Schedule ==
Date time, TV	Opponent	Result	Record	Site (attendance) city, state
Exhibition
11/02/2013*; 5:00 pm	La Verne	W 75–52	–	Centrum Arena (1,375); Cedar City, UT
Regular season
11/08/2013*; 7:00 pm	Arizona Christian	W 85–78	1–0	Centrum Arena (1,189); Cedar City, UT
11/12/2013*; 7:00 pm	at Utah State	L 57–90	1–1	Dee Glen Smith Spectrum (9,540); Logan, UT
11/18/2013*; 9:00 pm, P12N	at California	L 47–75	1–2	Haas Pavilion (5,224); Berkeley, CA
11/23/2013*; 7:30 pm	UC Riverside	L 59–74	1–3	Centrum Arena (1,507); Cedar City, UT
12/01/2013*; 2:00 pm	at Portland	L 57–86	1–4	Chiles Center (1,013); Portland, OR
12/03/2013*; 8:05 pm	at Cal State Northridge	L 57–84	1–5	Matadome (339); Northridge, CA
12/14/2013*; 5:00 pm	UNLV	L 51–73	1–6	Centrum Arena (3,505); Cedar City, UT
12/18/2013*; 8:00 pm, 4SD	at San Diego State	L 39–76	1–7	Viejas Arena (12,414); San Diego, CA
12/21/2013*; 3:00 pm	at San Diego	L 52–67	1–8	Jenny Craig Pavilion (1,101); San Diego, CA
01/02/2014; 7:00 pm	at North Dakota	L 61–65	1–9 (0–1)	Betty Engelstad Sioux Center (1,573); Grand Forks, ND
01/04/2014; 7:00 pm	at Northern Colorado	L 55–91	1–10 (0–2)	Butler–Hancock Sports Pavilion (987); Greeley, CO
01/11/2014; 7:00 pm	Sacramento State	L 49–77	1–11 (0–3)	Centrum Arena (1,733); Cedar City, UT
01/13/2014; 7:00 pm	Northern Arizona	L 36–70	1–12 (0–4)	Centrum Arena (1,609); Cedar City, UT
01/16/2014; 7:00 pm	at Idaho State	L 45–60	1–13 (0–5)	Reed Gym (1,938); Pocatello, ID
01/18/2014; 7:00 pm	at Weber State	L 59–65	1–14 (0–6)	Dee Events Center (7,479); Ogden, UT
01/23/2014; 7:05 pm	at Eastern Washington	L 83–90	1–15 (0–7)	Reese Court (871); Cheney, WA
01/25/2014; 8:00 pm	at Portland State	L 64–67	1–16 (0–8)	Stott Center (679); Portland, OR
01/30/2014; 7:00 pm	Montana	L 61–69	1–17 (0–9)	Centrum Arena (1,326); Cedar City, UT
02/01/2014; 7:00 pm	Montana State	L 52–54	1–18 (0–10)	Centrum Arena (1,543); Cedar City, UT
02/08/2014; 6:30 pm	at Northern Arizona	L 57–64	1–19 (0–11)	Walkup Skydome (N/A); Flagstaff, AZ
02/10/2014; 8:00 pm	at Sacramento State	L 56–68	1–20 (0–12)	Colberg Court (663); Sacramento, CA
02/13/2014; 7:00 pm	Weber State	L 55–75	1–21 (0–13)	Centrum Arena (2,177); Cedar City, UT
02/15/2014; 5:00 pm	Idaho State	L 65–75	1–22 (0–14)	Centrum Arena (1,207); Cedar City, UT
02/20/2014; 7:00 pm	Portland State	L 79–86	1–23 (0–15)	Centrum Arena (1,206); Cedar City, UT
02/22/2014; 7:00 pm	Eastern Washington	L 74–85	1–24 (0–16)	Centrum Arena (1,255); Cedar City, UT
02/27/2014; 7:00 pm	at Montana State	L 72–77 ^{OT}	1–25 (0–17)	Worthington Arena (2,184); Bozeman, MT
03/01/2014; 7:00 pm	at Montana	L 54–82	1–26 (0–18)	Dahlberg Arena (3,619); Missoula, MT
03/06/2014; 7:35 pm	North Dakota	W 77–71	2–26 (1–18)	Centrum Arena (985); Cedar City, UT
03/08/2014; 5:00 pm	Northern Colorado	L 52–77	2–27 (1–19)	Centrum Arena (888); Cedar City, UT
*Non-conference game. ^{#}Rankings from AP Poll. (#) Tournament seedings in parentheses. All times are in Mountain Time.
