= 2013–14 Portland State Vikings men's basketball team =

American college basketball season

2013–14 Portland State Vikings men's basketball
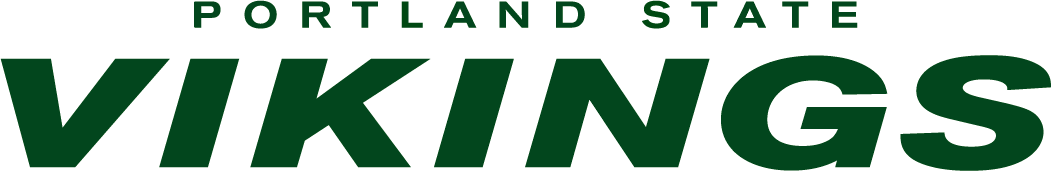

CIT, First round
- Conference: Big Sky Conference
- Record: 17–15 (11–9 Big Sky)
- Head coach: Tyler Geving (5th season)
- Assistant coaches: Jeff Hironaka; Jase Coburn; Anthony Owens
- Home arena: Stott Center

2013–14 Big Sky men's basketball standings
| | Conf. | | | | Overall |
| Team | W | | L | PCT | W | | L | PCT |
|---|---|---|---|---|---|---|---|---|
| Weber State † | 14 | – | 6 | .700 | 19 | – | 12 | .613 |
| Montana | 12 | – | 8 | .600 | 17 | – | 13 | .567 |
| North Dakota | 12 | – | 8 | .600 | 17 | – | 17 | .500 |
| Northern Arizona | 12 | – | 8 | .600 | 15 | – | 17 | .469 |
| Northern Colorado | 11 | – | 9 | .550 | 18 | – | 14 | .563 |
| Portland State | 11 | – | 9 | .550 | 17 | – | 15 | .531 |
| Eastern Washington | 10 | – | 10 | .500 | 15 | – | 16 | .484 |
| Sacramento State | 10 | – | 10 | .500 | 14 | – | 16 | .467 |
| Montana State | 9 | – | 11 | .450 | 14 | – | 17 | .452 |
| Idaho State | 8 | – | 12 | .400 | 11 | – | 18 | .379 |
| Southern Utah | 1 | – | 19 | .050 | 2 | – | 27 | .069 |
† Conference tournament winner

The 2013–14 Portland State Vikings men's basketball team represented Portland State University during the 2013–14 NCAA Division I men's basketball season. The Vikings, led by fifth year head coach Tyler Geving, played their home games at the Peter Stott Center and were members of the Big Sky Conference. They finished the season 17–15, 11–9 in Big Sky play to finish in a tie for fifth place. They advanced to the semifinals of the Big Sky Conference tournament where they lost to North Dakota. They were invited to the CollegeInsider.com Tournament where they lost in the first round to San Diego.

== Roster ==
| Number | Name | Position | Height | Weight | Year | Hometown |
|---|---|---|---|---|---|---|
| 0 | Gary Winston | Guard | 6–0 | 190 | Junior | Walla Walla, Washington |
| 1 | Zach Gengler | Guard | 6–2 | 180 | Freshman | Silverton, Oregon |
| 2 | Kyle Benton | Forward | 6–6 | 225 | Freshman | Long Beach, California |
| 3 | Dre Winston, Jr. | Guard | 6–1 | 170 | RS Junior | Lakewood, Washington |
| 4 | Sebastian Suarez | Guard | 6–4 | 210 | Junior | Ancud, Chile |
| 5 | Lamont Prosser | Center | 6–8 | 275 | Senior | Fort Wayne, Indiana |
| 10 | Jacob Begin | Guard | 6–1 | 185 | Junior | Tillamook, Oregon |
| 11 | Tim Douglas | Guard | 5–10 | 160 | RS Junior | Cerritos, California |
| 12 | Alyx Foster | Guard | 6–3 | 180 | Senior | Phoenix, Arizona |
| 13 | Tiegbe Bamba | Forward | 6–10 | 205 | Junior | Sarcelles, France |
| 15 | Marcus Hall | Guard | 6–4 | 200 | Senior | Bakersfield, California |
| 21 | Aaron Moore | Forward | 6–8 | 215 | Senior | Riverside, California |
| 23 | DaShaun Wiggins | Guard | 6–2 | 190 | Junior | Bronx, NY |
| 30 | Kyler Shula | Guard | 5–10 | 170 | Junior | Puyallup, Washington |
| 34 | Joel King | Guard | 6–3 | 185 | Junior | Lacey, Washington |
| 42 | Kyle Richardson | Forward | 6–7 | 235 | Senior | Lakewood, California |
| 44 | Brandon Cataldo | Center | 6–10 | 290 | Junior | Rainier, Oregon |

== Schedule ==
| Date time, TV | Opponent | Result | Record | Site (attendance) city, state |
Exhibition
| 11/01/2013*; 8:15 pm, no | Northwest Christian | W 85–73 | | Stott Center (898); Portland, OR |
Regular season
| 11/08/2013*; 7:30 pm, no | at UNLV | L 48–67 | 0–1 | Thomas & Mack Center (13,148); Paradise, NV |
| 11/13/2013*; 7:05 pm, no | Pacific Lutheran | W 79–43 | 1–1 | Stott Center (612); Portland, OR |
| 11/22/2013*; 5:30 pm, no | Loyola–Chicago; Portland State Tournament | W 67–63 | 2–1 | Stott Center (755); Portland, OR |
| 11/23/2013*; 5:30 pm, no | SIU Edwardsville; Portland State Tournament | W 77–74 | 3–1 | Stott Center (834); Portland, OR |
| 11/24/2013*; 3:00 pm, no | UC Davis; Portland State Tournament | W 79–63 | 4–1 | Stott Center (738); Portland, OR |
| 11/29/2013*; 6:00 pm, no | at Boise State | L 60–76 | 4–2 | Taco Bell Arena (6,345); Boise, ID |
| 12/07/2013*; 7:05 pm, no | Portland | L 76–92 | 4–3 | Stott Center (1,199); Portland, OR |
| 12/14/2013*; 7:05 pm, no | Idaho | L 75–76 | 4–4 | Stott Center (614); Portland, OR |
| 12/23/2013*; 2:05 pm, no | Evergreen State | W 98–65 | 5–4 | Stott Center (514); Portland, OR |
| 01/02/2014; 6:05 pm, no | at Idaho State | L 76–87 | 5–5 (0–1) | Holt Arena (1,809); Pocatello, ID |
| 01/04/2014; 6:05 pm, no | at Weber State | L 62–79 | 5–6 (0–2) | Dee Events Center (6,007); Ogden, UT |
| 01/09/2014; 7:05 pm, no | Montana State | L 76–79 | 5–7 (0–3) | Stott Center (761); Portland, OR |
| 01/11/2014; 7:05 pm, no | Montana | W 81–78 ^{3OT} | 6–7 (1–3) | Stott Center (851); Portland, OR |
| 01/16/2014; 7:05 pm, no | at Sacramento State | W 68–64 ^{OT} | 7–7 (2–3) | Colberg Court (464); Sacramento, CA |
| 01/18/2014; 2:00 pm, no | at Northern Arizona | L 56–77 | 7–8 (2–4) | Walkup Skydome (1,203); Flagstaff, AZ |
| 01/25/2014; 7:05 pm, no | Southern Utah | W 67–64 | 8–8 (3–4) | Stott Center (679); Portland, OR |
| 01/27/2014; 7:05 pm, no | Eastern Washington | W 92–83 | 9–8 (4–4) | Stott Center (723); Portland, OR |
| 01/30/2014; 7:05 pm, no | Northern Colorado | W 80–57 | 10–8 (5–4) | Stott Center (1,500); Portland, OR |
| 02/01/2014; 7:05 pm, no | North Dakota | W 70–68 | 11–8 (6–4) | Stott Center (733); Portland, OR |
| 02/06/2014; 6:05 pm, no | at Montana | L 76–82 ^{OT} | 11–9 (6–5) | Dahlberg Arena (3,152); Missoula, MT |
| 02/08/2014; 6:05 pm, no | at Montana State | L 64–69 | 11–10 (6–6) | Worthington Arena (2,206); Bozeman, MT |
| 02/13/2014; 7:05 pm, no | Northern Arizona | L 63–65 | 11–11 (6–7) | Stott Center (615); Portland, OR |
| 02/15/2014; 7:05 pm, no | Sacramento State | L 65–72 | 11–12 (6–8) | Stott Center (1,500); Portland, OR |
| 02/20/2014; 6:00 pm, no | at Southern Utah | W 86–79 | 12–12 (7–8) | Centrum Arena (1,206); Cedar City, UT |
| 02/24/2014; 6:00 pm, no | at Eastern Washington | W 87–76 | 13–12 (8–8) | Reese Court (614); Cheney, WA |
| 02/27/2014; 5:00 pm, no | at North Dakota | L 73–83 | 13–13 (8–9) | Betty Engelstad Sioux Center (1,607); Grand Forks, ND |
| 03/01/2014; 6:05 pm, no | at Northern Colorado | W 77–68 | 14–13 (9–9) | Butler–Hancock Sports Pavilion (1,630); Greeley, CO |
| 03/06/2014; 7:05 pm, no | Weber State | W 66–59 | 15–13 (10–9) | Stott Center (966); Portland, OR |
| 03/08/2014; 7:05 pm, no | Idaho State | W 78–74 | 16–13 (11–9) | Stott Center (1,237); Portland, OR |
Big Sky tournament
| 03/13/2014; 6:00 pm, no | vs. Montana; Quarterfinals | W 70–63 | 17–13 | Dee Events Center (N/A); Ogden, UT |
| 03/14/2014; 6:30 pm, no | vs. North Dakota; Semifinals | L 63–79 | 17–14 | Dee Events Center (5,228); Ogden, UT |
CIT
| 03/18/2014*; 7:00 pm, no | at San Diego; First round | L 65–87 | 17–15 | Jenny Craig Pavilion (1,041); San Diego, CA |
*Non-conference game. ^{#}Rankings from AP Poll. (#) Tournament seedings in parentheses. All times are in Pacific Time.
