= 2013–14 University of North Dakota men's basketball team =

American college basketball season

2013–14 University of North Dakota men's basketball

CIT, First round
- Conference: Big Sky Conference
- Record: 17–17 (12–8 Big Sky)
- Head coach: Brian Jones (8th season)
- Assistant coaches: Gameli Ahelegbe; Dean Oliver; Jason Shay
- Home arena: Betty Engelstad Sioux Center

2013–14 Big Sky men's basketball standings
	Conf.				Overall
Team	W		L	PCT	W		L	PCT
Weber State †	14	–	6	.700	19	–	12	.613
Montana	12	–	8	.600	17	–	13	.567
North Dakota	12	–	8	.600	17	–	17	.500
Northern Arizona	12	–	8	.600	15	–	17	.469
Northern Colorado	11	–	9	.550	18	–	14	.563
Portland State	11	–	9	.550	17	–	15	.531
Eastern Washington	10	–	10	.500	15	–	16	.484
Sacramento State	10	–	10	.500	14	–	16	.467
Montana State	9	–	11	.450	14	–	17	.452
Idaho State	8	–	12	.400	11	–	18	.379
Southern Utah	1	–	19	.050	2	–	27	.069
† Conference tournament winner

The 2013–14 University of North Dakota men's basketball team represented the University of North Dakota during the 2013–14 NCAA Division I men's basketball season. They are led by eighth year head coach Brian Jones and played their home games at the Betty Engelstad Sioux Center. They were members of the Big Sky Conference. They finished the season 17–17, 12–8 in Big Sky play to finish in a three-way tie for second place. They advanced to the championship game of the Big Sky Conference tournament where they lost to Weber State. They were invited to the CollegeIndiser.com Tournament for the fourth straight year. In the CIT, they lost in the first round to Nebraska–Omaha.

== Roster ==
Number	Name	Position	Height	Weight	Year	Hometown
0	Aaron Anderson	Guard	5–10	150	Senior	Brooklyn Park, Minnesota
1	Jaron Nash	Forward	6–8	185	Senior	Waterloo, Iowa
3	Lenny Antwi	Guard	6–1	176	Junior	Montreal, Quebec
5	Troy Huff	Guard/Forward	6–5	174	Senior	Milwaukee, Wisconsin
10	Shane Benton	Guard	6–3	202	Sophomore	Cedar Rapids, Iowa
11	Jamal Webb	Guard	6–1	188	Senior	Buffalo, New York
20	Thomas Blake	Guard	6–2	196	RS Freshman	Hagerstown, Maryland
21	Quinton Hooker	Guard	6–0	195	Freshman	Brooklyn Park, Minnesota
22	Estan Tyler	Guard	6–1	175	Junior	Saint Paul, Minnesota
24	Brandon Brekke	Forward/Center	6–8	216	Senior	East Grand Forks, Minnesota
25	Dustin Hobaugh	Guard	6–4	190	Sophomore	League City, Texas
32	Josh Schuler	Guard	6–3	184	Senior	Urbana, Ohio
33	Chad Calcaterra	Forward	6–9	230	Junior	Cloquet, Minnesota
41	Ryan Salmonson	Center	6–9	216	Junior	Colfax, California
42	Alonzo Traylor	Forward	6–7	214	Senior	Minneapolis, Minnesota

== Schedule ==
Date time, TV	Opponent	Result	Record	Site (attendance) city, state
Regular season
11/13/2013*; 7:00 pm	Minnesota Morris	W 110–69	1–0	Betty Engelstad Sioux Center (1,597); Grand Forks, ND
11/19/2013*; 7:00 pm, BTN	at No. 12 Wisconsin	L 85-103	1–1	Kohl Center (16,653); Madison, WI
11/24/2013*; 5:00 pm, Midco SN/FCS Pacific	North Dakota State	W 95–77	2–1	Betty Engelstad Sioux Center (3,142); Grand Forks, ND
11/29/2013*; 4:30 pm	vs. Cal Poly; Global Sports Hardwood Classic	L 43–70	2–2	Matthew Knight Arena (5,719); Eugene, OR
11/30/2013*; 5:30 pm	at No. 14 Oregon; Global Sports Hardwood Classic	L 76–91	2–3	Matthew Knight Arena (5,937); Eugene, OR
12/01/2013*; 6:30 pm	vs. Pacific; Global Sports Hardwood Classic	L 76–93	2–4	Matthew Knight Arena (5,580); Eugene, OR
12/07/2013*; 5:00 pm, FS1	at Butler	L 64–79	2–5	Hinkle Fieldhouse (6,355); Indianapolis, IN
12/11/2013*; 6:00 pm	at Bowling Green	L 69–79	2–6	Stroh Center (1,515); Bowling Green, OH
12/15/2013*; 4:00 pm	Presentation	W 78–32	3–6	Betty Engelstad Sioux Center (1,398); Grand Forks, ND
12/21/2013*; 4:00 pm, Midco SN	South Dakota State	L 70–77	3–7	Betty Engelstad Sioux Center (2,261); Grand Forks, ND
12/29/2013; 3:00 pm	at Northern Colorado	L 66–84	3–8 (0–1)	Butler–Hancock Sports Pavilion (912); Greeley, CO
01/02/2014; 8:00 pm, Midco SN	Southern Utah	W 65–61	4–8 (1–1)	Betty Engelstad Sioux Center (1,573); Grand Forks, ND
01/09/2014; 7:00 pm	Idaho State	W 66–62	5–8 (2–1)	Betty Engelstad Sioux Center (1,391); Grand Forks, ND
01/11/2014; 2:00 pm	Weber State	L 60–72	5–9 (2–2)	Betty Engelstad Sioux Center (1,945); Grand Forks, ND
01/16/2014; 8:00 pm	at Montana	L 71–84	5–10 (2–3)	Dahlberg Arena (3,475); Missoula, MT
01/18/2014; 8:00 pm	at Montana State	W 72–69	6–10 (3–3)	Worthington Arena (2,685); Bozeman, MT
01/23/2014; 7:00 pm	Sacramento State	W 82–71	7–10 (4–3)	Betty Engelstad Sioux Center (1,743); Grand Forks, ND
01/25/2014; 2:00 pm	Northern Arizona	W 84–68	8–10 (5–3)	Betty Engelstad Sioux Center (1,840); Grand Forks, ND
01/30/2014; 8:00 pm	at Eastern Washington	W 73–61	9–10 (6–3)	Reese Court (929); Cheney, WA
02/01/2014; 9:00 pm	at Portland State	L 68–70	9–11 (6–4)	Stott Center (733); Portland, OR
02/06/2014; 8:00 pm	at Weber State	L 72–84	9–12 (6–5)	Dee Events Center (6,294); Ogden, UT
02/08/2014; 8:00 pm	at Idaho State	W 80–75	10–12 (7–5)	Holt Arena (2,245); Pocatello, ID
02/13/2014; 7:00 pm, Midco SN	Montana State	L 70–78	10–13 (7–6)	Betty Engelstad Sioux Center (1,669); Grand Forks, ND
02/15/2014; 2:00 pm	Montana	W 74–69	11–13 (8–6)	Betty Engelstad Sioux Center (2,033); Grand Forks, ND
02/20/2014; 9:00 pm	at Sacramento State	L 65–71	11–14 (8–7)	Colberg Court (718); Sacramento, CA
02/22/2013; 7:30 pm	at Northern Arizona	W 75–63	12–14 (9–7)	Walkup Skydome (1,404); Flagstaff, AZ
02/27/2014; 7:00 pm	Portland State	W 83–73	13–14 (10–7)	Betty Engelstad Sioux Center (1,607); Grand Forks, ND
03/01/2014; 2:00 pm, Midco SN	Eastern Washington	W 69–67	14–14 (11–7)	Betty Engelstad Sioux Center (1,780); Grand Forks, ND
03/04/2014; 7:00 pm	Northern Colorado	W 94–90	15–14 (12–7)	Betty Engelstad Sioux Center (1,767); Grand Forks, ND
03/06/2014; 8:30 pm	at Southern Utah	L 71–77	15–15 (12–8)	Centrum Arena (985); Cedar City, UT
Big Sky tournament
03/13/2014; 2:05 pm	vs. Sacramento State; Quarterfinals	W 79–76	16–15	Dee Events Center (N/A); Ogden, UT
03/14/2014; 6:30 pm	vs. Portland State; Semifinals	W 79–63	17–15	Dee Events Center (1,842); Ogden, UT
03/15/2014; 8:00 pm, ESPNU	at Weber State; Championship	L 67–88	17–16	Dee Events Center (6,294); Ogden, UT
CIT
03/19/2014*; 7:00 pm	at Nebraska–Omaha; First round	L 75–91	17–17	Ralston Arena (2,158); Ralston, NE
*Non-conference game. ^{#}Rankings from AP Poll. (#) Tournament seedings in parentheses. All times are in Central Time.
