= 2013–14 Sacramento State Hornets men's basketball team =

American college basketball season

2013–14 Sacramento State Hornets men's basketball
- Conference: Big Sky Conference
- Record: 14–16 (10–10 Big Sky)
- Head coach: Brian Katz (6th season)
- Assistant coaches: Brandon Laird; Ajay Riding; Chris Walker
- Home arena: Hornets Nest

2013–14 Big Sky men's basketball standings
	Conf.				Overall
Team	W		L	PCT	W		L	PCT
Weber State †	14	–	6	.700	19	–	12	.613
Montana	12	–	8	.600	17	–	13	.567
North Dakota	12	–	8	.600	17	–	17	.500
Northern Arizona	12	–	8	.600	15	–	17	.469
Northern Colorado	11	–	9	.550	18	–	14	.563
Portland State	11	–	9	.550	17	–	15	.531
Eastern Washington	10	–	10	.500	15	–	16	.484
Sacramento State	10	–	10	.500	14	–	16	.467
Montana State	9	–	11	.450	14	–	17	.452
Idaho State	8	–	12	.400	11	–	18	.379
Southern Utah	1	–	19	.050	2	–	27	.069
† Conference tournament winner

The 2013–14 Sacramento State Hornets men's basketball team represented California State University, Sacramento during the 2013–14 NCAA Division I men's basketball season. The Hornets were led by sixth year head coach Brian Katz and played their home games at Hornets Nest. They were members of the Big Sky Conference.

The Hornets enter the season with a new assistant coach in Chris Walker, who was promoted from Director of Basketball operations.

They finished the season 14–16, 10–10 in Big Sky play to finish in a tie for seventh place. They lost in the quarterfinals of the Big Sky tournament to North Dakota.

== Roster ==
Number	Name	Position	Height	Weight	Year	Hometown
0	Case Rada	Guard	6–3	200	Sophomore	Burbank, Washington
1	Dreon Barlett	Guard	6–3	170	Sophomore	Pasadena, California
2	Cody Demps	Guard	6–4	200	Sophomore	Elk Grove, California
4	Joey Quigley	Forward	6–8	210	Senior	Kansas City, Missouri
5	Dylan Garrity	Guard	6–2	170	Junior	Huntington Beach, California
10	Mikh McKinney	Guard	6–1	165	Junior	Union City, California
11	Trevis Jackson	Guard	5–11	160	Freshman	Santa Monica, California
12	Kendell Groom	Guard	6–3	175	Senior	New Haven, Connecticut
15	Ryan Okwudibonye	Center	6–8	235	Junior	Huntington Beach, California
20	Zach Mills	Forward	6–5	215	Junior	Yorba Linda, California
22	Jordan Salley	Forward	6–6	230	Senior	La Verne, California
32	Nick Hornsby	Guard/Forward	6–7	200	Freshman	Irvine, California
34	Alex Tiffin	Forward	6–9	235	Junior	Thousand Oaks, California
44	Eric Stuteville	Center	6–11	240	Freshman	Orangevale, California

== Schedule ==
Date time, TV	Opponent	Result	Record	Site (attendance) city, state
Regular season
11/08/2013*; 7:35 pm	UC Santa Cruz	W 73–43	1–0	Hornets Nest (621); Sacramento, CA
11/13/2013*; 7:00 pm	at Cal State Bakersfield	L 66–74	1–1	Rabobank Arena (1,201); Bakersfield, CA
11/18/2013*; 8:00 pm, P12N	at No. 22 UCLA	L 50–86	1–2	Pauley Pavilion (5,489); Los Angeles, CA
11/26/2013*; 7:05 pm	at UC Davis	W 73–67	2–2	The Pavilion (2,465); Davis, CA
11/30/2013*; 7:05 pm	UC Irvine	L 53–79	2–3	Hornets Nest (961); Sacramento, CA
12/07/2013*; 6:05 pm	at UTEP	L 51–69	2–4	Don Haskins Center (7,524); El Paso, TX
12/14/2013*; 7:05 pm	William Jessup	W 85–54	3–4	Hornets Nest (661); Sacramento, CA
12/21/2013*; 3:05 pm	at Cal State Fullerton	L 51–59	3–5	Titan Gym (833); Fullerton, CA
12/29/2013*; 2:05 pm	UC Riverside	W 69–67	4–5	Hornets Nest (504); Sacramento, CA
01/02/2014; 6:00 pm	at Montana State	L 55–70	4–6 (0–1)	Worthington Arena (2,159); Bozeman, MT
01/04/2014; 6:05 pm	at Montana	L 70–82	4–7 (0–2)	Dahlberg Arena (3,647); Missoula, MT
01/09/2014; 5:30 pm	at Northern Arizona	L 65–75	4–8 (0–3)	Walkup Skydome (905); Flagstaff, AZ
01/11/2014; 6:05 pm	at Southern Utah	W 77–49	5–8 (1–3)	Centrum Arena (1,733); Cedar City, UT
01/16/2014; 7:05 pm	Portland State	L 64–68 ^{OT}	5–9 (1–4)	Hornets Nest (464); Sacramento, CA
01/18/2014; 7:05 pm	Eastern Washington	W 75–64	6–9 (2–4)	Hornets Nest (670); Sacramento, CA
01/23/2014; 5:00 pm	at North Dakota	L 71–82	6–10 (2–5)	Betty Engelstad Sioux Center (1,743); Grand Forks, ND
01/25/2014; 6:05 pm	at Northern Colorado	L 62–72	6–11 (2–6)	Butler–Hancock Sports Pavilion (1,271); Greeley, CO
01/30/2014; 7:05 pm	Idaho State	W 84–78	7–11 (3–6)	Hornets Nest (574); Sacramento, CA
02/01/2014; 7:05 pm	Weber State	W 78–75 ^{OT}	8–11 (4–6)	Hornets Nest (779); Sacramento, CA
02/06/2014; 7:05 pm	Northern Arizona	W 87–70	9–11 (5–6)	Hornets Nest (590); Sacramento, CA
02/10/2014; 7:05 pm	Southern Utah	W 68–56	10–11 (6–6)	Hornets Nest (663); Sacramento, CA
02/13/2014; 6:05 pm	at Eastern Washington	L 72–85	10–12 (6–7)	Reese Court (897); Cheney, WA
02/15/2014; 7:00 pm	at Portland State	W 72–65	11–12 (7–7)	Stott Center (1,500); Portland, OR
02/20/2014; 7:05 pm	North Dakota	W 71–65	12–12 (8–7)	Hornets Nest (718); Sacramento, CA
02/22/2014; 7:05 pm	Northern Colorado	W 79–58	13–12 (9–7)	Hornets Nest (877); Sacramento, CA
02/27/2014; 6:05 pm	at Weber State	L 67–79	13–13 (9–8)	Dee Events Center (7,886); Ogden, UT
03/01/2013; 6:05 pm	at Idaho State	L 67–80	13–14 (9–9)	Reed Gym (2,013); Pocatello, ID
03/06/2014; 7:05 pm	Montana State	L 55–70	13–15 (9–10)	Hornets Nest (1,146); Sacramento, CA
03/08/2014; 7:05 pm	Montana	W 84–59	14–15 (10–10)	Hornets Nest (1,001); Sacramento, CA
Big Sky tournament
03/13/2014; 1:05 pm	North Dakota; Quarterfinals	L 76–79	14–16	Dee Events Center (N/A); Ogden, UT
*Non-conference game. ^{#}Rankings from AP Poll. (#) Tournament seedings in parentheses. All times are in Pacific Time.
