= 2013–14 Eastern Washington Eagles men's basketball team =

American college basketball season

2013–14 Eastern Washington Eagles men's basketball
- Conference: Big Sky Conference
- Record: 15–16 (10–10 Big Sky)
- Head coach: Jim Hayford (3rd season)
- Assistant coaches: Craig Fortier; Shantay Legans; Alex Pribble
- Home arena: Reese Court

2013–14 Big Sky men's basketball standings
	Conf.				Overall
Team	W		L	PCT	W		L	PCT
Weber State †	14	–	6	.700	19	–	12	.613
Montana	12	–	8	.600	17	–	13	.567
North Dakota	12	–	8	.600	17	–	17	.500
Northern Arizona	12	–	8	.600	15	–	17	.469
Northern Colorado	11	–	9	.550	18	–	14	.563
Portland State	11	–	9	.550	17	–	15	.531
Eastern Washington	10	–	10	.500	15	–	16	.484
Sacramento State	10	–	10	.500	14	–	16	.467
Montana State	9	–	11	.450	14	–	17	.452
Idaho State	8	–	12	.400	11	–	18	.379
Southern Utah	1	–	19	.050	2	–	27	.069
† Conference tournament winner

The 2013–14 Eastern Washington Eagles men's basketball team represented Eastern Washington University during the 2013–14 NCAA Division I men's basketball season. The Eagles, are led by third year head coach Jim Hayford and played their home games at Reese Court. They were members of the Big Sky Conference.

The Eagles entered the season with a new assistant coach after Craig Ehlo resigned in July.

They finished the season 15–16, 10–10 in Big Sky play to finish in a tie for seventh place. They failed to qualify for the Big Sky Conference tournament.

== Roster ==
Number	Name	Position	Height	Weight	Year	Hometown
0	Ognjen Miljkovic	Forward	6–7	220	Freshman	Belgrade, Serbia
1	Tyler Harvey	Guard	6–4	180	Sophomore	Torrance, California
2	Daniel Hill	Guard	5–9	165	Sophomore	Sydney, Australia
4	Danny Powell	Forward	6–6	230	Freshman	Phoenix, Arizona
10	Parker Kelly	Guard	6–4	195	Junior	Spokane, Washington
11	Sir Washington	Guard	6–3	180	Freshman	Las Vegas, Nevada
12	Martin Seiferth	Forward	6–10	235	Junior	Berlin, Germany
13	Thomas Reuter	Forward	6–6	230	Sophomore	Breckerfeld, Germany
21	Frederik Jörg	Forward	7–1	290	Sophomore	Korschenbroich, Germany
22	Drew Brandon	Guard	6–4	180	Junior	Corona, California
33	Garrett Moon	Forward	6–5	190	Junior	San Francisco, California
44	Felix Von Hofe	Forward	6–5	200	Freshman	Melbourne, Australia
55	Venky Jois	Forward	6–7	230	Sophomore	Boronia, Australia

== Schedule ==
Date time, TV	Opponent	Result	Record	Site (attendance) city, state
Regular season
11/10/2013*; 2:05 pm	Pacific (Ore.)	W 87–58	1–0	Reese Court (1,179); Cheney, WA
11/17/2013*; 5:00 pm, P12N	at Washington; 2K Sports Classic	L 80–92	1–1	Alaska Airlines Arena (6,504); Seattle, WA
11/19/2013*; 6:05 pm	Walla Walla	W 82–44	2–1	Reese Court (1,119); Cheney, WA
11/22/2013*; 4:30 pm	vs. Boston University; 2K Sports Classic	W 80–68	3–1	Bren Events Center (2,379); Irvine, CA
11/23/2013*; 3:00 pm	vs. LIU Brooklyn; 2K Sports Classic	W 102–70	4–1	Bren Events Center (2,108); Irvine, CA
11/24/2013*; 4:00 pm	at UC Irvine; 2K Sports Classic	L 58–81	4–2	Bren Events Center (1,576); Irvine, CA
11/29/2013*; 6:05 pm	Seattle	W 82–75	5–2	Reese Court (829); Cheney, WA
12/08/2013*; 5:30 pm	at Saint Mary's	L 65–93	5–3	McKeon Pavilion (2,117); Moraga, CA
12/15/2013*; 2:05 pm, SWX	UC Irvine	L 61–70	5–4	Reese Court (911); Cheney, WA
12/22/2013*; 2:00 pm, FS1	at Seton Hall	L 70–92	5–5	Prudential Center (6,190); Newark, NJ
12/28/2013*; 10:00 am, SNY	at No. 15 UConn	L 65–82	5–6	Webster Bank Arena (9,274); Bridgeport, CT
01/02/2014; 6:00 pm	at Weber State	L 67–74	5–7 (0–1)	Dee Events Center (5,748); Ogden, UT
01/04/2014; 6:00 pm	at Idaho State	L 72–83	5–8 (0–2)	Holt Arena (1,532); Pocatello, ID
01/09/2014; 6:05 pm	Montana	W 69–62	6–8 (1–2)	Reese Court (2,043); Cheney, WA
01/11/2014; 2:00 pm, SWX	Montana State	W 77–72	7–8 (2–2)	Reese Court (1,004); Cheney, WA
01/16/2014; 5:30 pm, FSAZ+	at Northern Arizona	L 65–84	7–9 (2–3)	Walkup Skydome (1,026); Flagstaff, AZ
01/18/2014; 7:00 pm	at Sacramento State	L 64–75	7–10 (2–4)	Colberg Court (670); Sacramento, CA
01/23/2014; 6:05 pm	Southern Utah	W 90–83	8–10 (3–4)	Reese Court (871); Cheney, WA
01/27/2014; 7:00 pm	at Portland State	L 83–93	8–11 (3–5)	Stott Center (723); Portland, OR
01/30/2014; 6:05 pm	North Dakota	L 61–73	8–12 (3–6)	Reese Court (929); Cheney, WA
02/01/2014; 2:00 pm, SWX	Northern Colorado	W 94–90 ^{OT}	9–12 (4–6)	Reese Court (1,440); Cheney, WA
02/06/2014; 6:00 pm	at Montana State	W 79–50	10–12 (5–6)	Worthington Arena (1,949); Bozeman, MT
02/08/2014; 6:00 pm	at Montana	L 77–82	10–13 (5–7)	Dahlberg Arena (4,016); Missoula, MT
02/13/2014; 6:05 pm	Sacramento State	W 85–72	11–13 (6–7)	Reese Court (897); Cheney, WA
02/15/2014; 2:00 pm	Northern Arizona	W 84–65	12–13 (7–7)	Reese Court (1,028); Cheney, WA
02/22/2014; 6:00 pm	at Southern Utah	W 85–74	13–13 (8–7)	Centrum Arena (1,255); Cedar City, UT
02/24/2014; 6:00 pm, SWX	Portland State	L 76–87	13–14 (8–8)	Reese Court (614); Cheney, WA
02/27/2014; 6:00 pm	at Northern Colorado	W 80–66	14–14 (9–8)	Butler–Hancock Sports Pavilion (1,786); Greeley, CO
03/01/2014; 12:00 pm, MSN	at North Dakota	L 67–69	14–15 (9–9)	Betty Engelstad Sioux Center (1,780); Grand Forks, ND
03/06/2014; 6:05 pm	Idaho State	W 77–69	15–15 (10–9)	Reese Court (2,004); Cheney, WA
03/08/2014; 2:00 pm	Weber State	L 78–82	15–16 (10–10)	Reese Court (2,058); Cheney, WA
*Non-conference game. ^{#}Rankings from AP Poll. (#) Tournament seedings in parentheses. All times are in Pacific Time.

== See also ==
2013–14 Eastern Washington Eagles women's basketball team
