= 2013–14 Weber State Wildcats men's basketball team =

American college basketball season

2013–14 Weber State Wildcats men's basketball

Big Sky Regular Season and tournament champions

NCAA tournament, round of 64
- Conference: Big Sky Conference
- Record: 19–12 (14–6 Big Sky)
- Head coach: Randy Rahe (8th season)
- Assistant coaches: Eric Duft; Phil Beckner; Kellen McCoy
- Home arena: Dee Events Center

2013–14 Big Sky men's basketball standings
	Conf.				Overall
Team	W		L	PCT	W		L	PCT
Weber State †	14	–	6	.700	19	–	12	.613
Montana	12	–	8	.600	17	–	13	.567
North Dakota	12	–	8	.600	17	–	17	.500
Northern Arizona	12	–	8	.600	15	–	17	.469
Northern Colorado	11	–	9	.550	18	–	14	.563
Portland State	11	–	9	.550	17	–	15	.531
Eastern Washington	10	–	10	.500	15	–	16	.484
Sacramento State	10	–	10	.500	14	–	16	.467
Montana State	9	–	11	.450	14	–	17	.452
Idaho State	8	–	12	.400	11	–	18	.379
Southern Utah	1	–	19	.050	2	–	27	.069
† Conference tournament winner

The 2013–14 Weber State Wildcats men's basketball team represented Weber State University during the 2013–14 NCAA Division I men's basketball season. The Wildcats were led by eighth year head coach Randy Rahe and played their home games at the Dee Events Center. They were members of the Big Sky Conference. They finished the season 19–12, 14–6 in Big Sky play to win the Big Sky regular season championship. They were also champions of the Big Sky Conference tournament to earn an automatic bid to the NCAA tournament where they lost in the second round to Arizona.

== Radio broadcasts ==
All Wildcats games will be heard on KLO (Ogden) and KLO-FM (Salt Lake City), nicknamed KLO AM/FM. KLO is a move from the previous radio broadcast group of 1280 AM, but radio broadcasts will still be done online via Big Sky TV for non-televised home games and on KLOradio.com for all games. Carl Arky will call every game that doesn't conflict with football broadcasts. Dutch Belnap will return as the radio analyst.

== Before the season ==
=== Departures ===
Name	Number	Pos.	Height	Weight	Year	Hometown	Notes
Scott Bamforth	4	G/F	6'2"	190	Senior	Albuquerque, New Mexico	Graduated
Frank Otis	13	F	6'6"	220	Senior	Oakland, California	Graduated
Jordan Rex	50	G/F	6'8"	230	Junior	St. George, Utah	Transferred to Dixie State after redshirting 2012-13

=== Recruits ===
College recruiting information
Name	Hometown	School	Height	Weight	Commit date
Jeremy Senglin; G	Arlington, Texas	Bowie	6 ft 1 in (1.85 m)	168 lb (76 kg)	Sep 13, 2012
Jeremy Senglin; G	Recruit ratings: Scout: Rivals: (66)				
Richaud Gittens; F	Tempe, Arizona	Marcos de Niza	6 ft 4 in (1.93 m)	200 lb (91 kg)	Sep 7, 2012
Richaud Gittens; F	Recruit ratings: Scout: Rivals: (69)				
Josh Fuller; F	Rexburg, Idaho	Madison	6 ft 7 in (2.01 m)	210 lb (95 kg)	Nov 30, 2012
Josh Fuller; F	Recruit ratings: Scout: Rivals: (LQ)				
Overall recruit ranking: Scout: NR Rivals: NR ESPN: NR
Note: In many cases, Scout, Rivals, 247Sports, On3, and ESPN may conflict in their listings of height and weight.; In these cases, the average was taken. ESPN grades are on a 100-point scale.; Sources: "Weber State 2013 Basketball Commitments". Rivals.; "2013 Weber State Basketball Commits". Scout.; "ESPN". ESPN.; "Scout.com Team Recruiting Rankings". Scout.; "2013 Team Ranking". Rivals.

== Roster ==
Number	Name	Position	Height	Weight	Year	Hometown
0	Christian McDonald	Guard	6–4	155	Freshman	Lake Oswego, Oregon
5	Jordan Richardson	Guard	6–1	180	Senior	Lewisville, Texas
15	Davion Berry	Guard/Forward	6–4	185	Senior	Oakland, California
21	Joel Bolomboy	Forward/Center	6–9	225	Sophomore	Fort Worth, Texas
23	Richaud Gittens	Guard	6–4	185	Freshman	Tempe, Arizona
25	Byron Fulton	Forward	6–7	235	Senior	Phoenix, Arizona
30	Jeremy Senglin	Guard	6–2	185	Freshman	Arlington, Texas
32	Royce Williams	Guard/Forward	6–5	195	Junior	Los Angeles, California
35	Kyndahl Hill	Forward	6–7	210	Freshman	Humble, Texas
40	Josh Fuller	Forward	6–6	220	Freshman	Rexburg, Idaho
44	Kyle Tresnak	Center	6–10	250	Junior	Scottsdale, Arizona
50	Aziz Leeks	Forward	6–7	200	Freshman	Las Vegas, Nevada
	Brady Borklund	Forward	6–8	210	Freshman	Ogden, Utah
	J.C. Kennedy	Guard	6–4	160	Freshman	Nampa, Idaho

== Schedule ==
Date time, TV	Rank^{#}	Opponent^{#}	Result	Record	Site (attendance) city, state
Exhibition
11/02/2013*; 7:00 pm		Adams State	W 85–77	–	Dee Events Center (2,623); Ogden, UT
Regular season
11/09/2013*; 7:00 pm, BYUtv		at BYU; Old Oquirrh Bucket	L 72–81	0–1	Marriott Center (15,696); Provo, UT
11/16/2013*; 3:00 pm		at Colorado State	L 67–88	0–2	Moby Arena (4,133); Fort Collins, CO
11/26/2013*; 7:30 pm		Utah State; Old Oquirrh Bucket	L 71–77	0–3	Dee Events Center (9,169); Ogden, UT
11/30/2013*; 7:00 pm		San Jose State	W 72–55	1–3	Dee Evens Center (5,584); Ogden, UT
12/07/2013*; 6:30 pm		at Texas–Arlington	Canceled due to inclement weather		College Park Center; Arlington, TX
12/11/2013*; 7:00 pm		at Utah Valley; Old Oquirrh Bucket	L 59–62	1–4	UCCU Center (2,921); Orem, UT
12/17/2013*; 7:00 pm		St. Katherine	W 107–36	2–4	Dee Events Center (5,260); Ogden, UT
12/22/2013*; 5:00 pm, P12N		at UCLA	L 60–83	2–5	Pauley Pavilion (7,013); Los Angeles, CA
12/28/2013*; 7:00 pm		Northern New Mexico	W 75–49	3–5	Dee Events Center (5,746); Ogden, UT
01/02/2014; 7:00 pm		Eastern Washington	W 74–67	4–5 (1–0)	Dee Events Center (5,748); Ogden, UT
01/04/2014; 7:00 pm		Portland State	W 79–62	5–5 (2–0)	Dee Events Center (6,007); Ogden, UT
01/09/2014; 7:00 pm, ALT		at Northern Colorado	L 51–70	5–6 (2–1)	Butler–Hancock Sports Pavilion (1,102); Greeley, CO
01/11/2014; 1:00 pm		at North Dakota	W 72–60	6–6 (3–1)	Betty Engelstad Sioux Center (1,945); Grand Forks, ND
01/18/2014; 7:00 pm		Southern Utah; Old Oquirrh Bucket	W 65–59	7–6 (4–1)	Dee Events Center (7,479); Ogden, UT
01/20/2014; 7:00 pm		Idaho State	W 65–59	8–6 (5–1)	Dee Events Center (6,107); Ogden, UT
01/23/2014; 7:00 pm		Montana State	W 86–57	9–6 (6–1)	Dee Events Center (7,358); Ogden, UT
01/25/2014; 7:00 pm		Montana	W 68–63	10–6 (7–1)	Dee Events Center (8,566); Ogden, UT
01/30/2014; 6:30 pm		at Northern Arizona	W 76–67	11–6 (8–1)	Walkup Skydome (927); Flagstaff, AZ
02/01/2014; 8:00 pm		at Sacramento State	L 75–78 ^{OT}	11–7 (8–2)	Colberg Court (779); Sacramento, CA
02/06/2014; 7:00 pm		North Dakota	W 84–72	12–7 (9–2)	Dee Events Center (6,294); Ogden, UT
02/08/2014; 7:00 pm		Northern Colorado	W 79–65	13–7 (10–2)	Dee Events Center (8,151); Ogden, UT
02/13/2014; 7:00 pm		at Southern Utah; Old Oquirrh Bucket	W 75–55	14–7 (11–2)	Centrum Arena (2,177); Cedar City, UT
02/17/2014; 7:00 pm		at Idaho State	L 75–78 ^{OT}	14–8 (11–3)	Reed Gym (2,047); Pocatello, ID
02/20/2014; 7:00 pm		at Montana	L 57–68	14–9 (11–4)	Dahlberg Arena (3,530); Missoula, MT
02/22/2014; 7:00 pm		at Montana State	W 86–68	15–9 (12–4)	Worthington Arena (2,437); Bozeman, MT
02/27/2014; 7:00 pm		Sacramento State	W 79–67	16–9 (13–4)	Dee Events Center (7,886); Ogden, UT
03/01/2014; 7:00 pm		Northern Arizona	L 71–73 ^{OT}	16–10 (13–5)	Dee Events Center (8,463); Ogden, UT
03/06/2014; 8:00 pm		at Portland State	L 59–66	16–11 (13–6)	Stott Center (966); Portland, OR
03/08/2014; 3:00 pm		at Eastern Washington	W 82–78	17–11 (14–6)	Reese Court (2,058); Cheney, WA
Big Sky tournament
03/14/2014; 7:05 pm	(1)	(6) Northern Colorado; Semifinals	W 66–63 ^{OT}	18–11	Dee Events Center (5,228); Ogden, UT
03/15/2014; 8:00 pm, ESPNU	(1)	vs. (2) North Dakota; Championship	W 88–65	19–11	Dee Events Center (6,294); Ogden, UT
NCAA tournament
03/21/2014*; 12:10 pm, TNT	(16 W)	vs. (1 W) No. 4 Arizona; Second round	L 59–68	19–12	Viejas Arena (11,196); San Diego, CA
*Non-conference game. ^{#}Rankings from AP poll, (#) during NCAA Tournament is seed within region W=West. (#) Tournament seedings in parentheses. All times are in Mountain time.
