= 2013–14 Montana Grizzlies basketball team =

American college basketball season

2013–14 Montana Grizzlies men's basketball
- Conference: Big Sky Conference
- Record: 17–13 (12–8 Big Sky)
- Head coach: Wayne Tinkle (8th season)
- Assistant coaches: Jonathan Metzger-Jones; Kurt Paulson; Kerry Rupp
- Home arena: Dahlberg Arena

2013–14 Big Sky men's basketball standings
	Conf.				Overall
Team	W		L	PCT	W		L	PCT
Weber State †	14	–	6	.700	19	–	12	.613
Montana	12	–	8	.600	17	–	13	.567
North Dakota	12	–	8	.600	17	–	17	.500
Northern Arizona	12	–	8	.600	15	–	17	.469
Northern Colorado	11	–	9	.550	18	–	14	.563
Portland State	11	–	9	.550	17	–	15	.531
Eastern Washington	10	–	10	.500	15	–	16	.484
Sacramento State	10	–	10	.500	14	–	16	.467
Montana State	9	–	11	.450	14	–	17	.452
Idaho State	8	–	12	.400	11	–	18	.379
Southern Utah	1	–	19	.050	2	–	27	.069
† Conference tournament winner

The 2013–14 Montana Grizzlies basketball team represented the University of Montana during the 2013–14 NCAA Division I men's basketball season. The Grizzlies, led by eighth year head coach Wayne Tinkle, played their home games at Dahlberg Arena and were members of the Big Sky Conference. They finished the season 17–13, 12–8 in Big Sky play to finish in a three way tie for second place. They lost in the quarterfinals of the Big Sky Conference tournament to Portland State.

On May 29, head coach Wayne Tinkle resigned to take the head coaching position at Oregon State.

== Roster ==
Number	Name	Position	Height	Weight	Year	Hometown
0	Morgan Young	Guard	6–0	175	RS Sophomore	Lustre, Montana
1	Mario Dunn Jr.	Guard	6–0	171	Freshman	Oakland, California
10	Jordan Gregory	Guard	6–2	194	Junior	Pueblo, Colorado
15	Keron DeShields	Guard	6–2	177	Junior	Baltimore, Maryland
20	Nick Emerson	Forward	6–5	209	RS Sophomore	Columbia Falls, Montana
22	Riley Bradshaw	Guard	6–2	180	RS Freshman	Corvallis, Montana
24	Chris Kemp	Forward	6–7	236	Junior	Baltimore, Maryland
31	Jack Lopez	Guard	6–5	210	Freshman	Bankstown, Australia
32	Kareem Jamar	Guard/Forward	6–5	207	Senior	Venice, California
33	Michael Weisner	Forward	6–7	193	RS Junior	Walla Walla, Washington
34	Brandon Gfeller	Guard	6–4	190	Freshman	Colfax, Washington
40	Daine Muller	Guard	6–4	190	Freshman	Billings, Montana
41	Andy Martin	Center	7–0	222	Sophomore	Casper, Wyoming
45	Eric Hutchison	Center	6–9	243	Senior	Longview, Washington
50	Martin Breunig	Forward	6–8	217	Junior	Leverkusen, Germany

== Schedule ==
Date time, TV	Opponent	Result	Record	Site (attendance) city, state
Exhibition
10/26/2013*; 7:00 pm	Simon Fraser	W 102–49		Dahlberg Arena (2,711); Missoula, MT
11/06/2013*; 7:00 pm	Lewis–Clark State	W 78–67		Dahlberg Arena (2,537); Missoula, MT
Regular season
11/12/2013*; 6:00 pm	at Minnesota	L 58–84	0–1	Williams Arena (10,459); Minneapolis, MN
11/14/2013*; 6:00 pm	at South Dakota State	W 77–69	1–1	Frost Arena (2,472); Brookings, SD
11/22/2013*; 7:00 pm	San Francisco	L 74–75	1–2	Dahlberg Arena (3,615); Missoula, MT
11/26/2013*; 7:00 pm, P12N	at Washington	L 79–83	1–3	Alaska Airlines Arena (6,062); Seattle, WA
11/29/2013*; 11:30 pm	at Hawaiʻi	L 61–72	1–4	Stan Sheriff Center (5,740); Honolulu, HI
12/11/2013*; 7:00 pm	Idaho	W 69–58	2–4	Dahlberg Arena (2,882); Missoula, MT
12/15/2013*; 7:00 pm	Saint Martin's	W 73–57	3–4	Dahlberg Arena (2,559); Missoula, MT
12/20/2013*; 7:00 pm	Montana–Western	W 91–74	4–4	Dahlberg Arena (2,771); Missoula, MT
12/28/2013*; 8:00 pm	at Idaho	W 72–71	5–4	Cowan Spectrum (1,427); Moscow, ID
01/02/2014; 7:00 pm	Northern Arizona	L 65–73	5–5 (0–1)	Dahlberg Arena (3,883); Missoula, MT
01/04/2014; 7:00 pm	Sacramento State	W 82–70	6–5 (1–1)	Dahlberg Arena (3,647); Missoula, MT
01/09/2014; 7:00 pm	at Eastern Washington	L 62–69	6–6 (1–2)	Reese Court (2,043); Cheney, WA
01/11/2014; 8:00 pm	at Portland State	L 78–81 ^{3OT}	6–7 (1–3)	Stott Center (851); Portland, OR
01/16/2014; 7:00 pm	North Dakota	W 84–71	7–7 (2–3)	Dahlberg Arena (3,475); Missoula, MT
01/18/2014; 7:00 pm	Northern Colorado	L 73–84	7–8 (2–4)	Dahlberg Arena (4,106); Missoula, MT
01/23/2014; 8:00 pm	at Idaho State	W 59–54	8–8 (3–4)	Reed Gym (1,838); Pocatello, ID
01/25/2014; 7:00 pm	at Weber State	L 63–68	8–9 (3–5)	Dee Events Center (8,566); Ogden, UT
01/30/2014; 7:00 pm	at Southern Utah	W 69–61	9–9 (4–5)	Centrum Arena (1,326); Cedar City, UT
02/03/2014; 7:00 pm	at Montana State	W 70–66	10–9 (5–5)	Worthington Arena (3,424); Bozeman, MT
02/06/2014; 7:00 pm	Portland State	W 82–76 ^{OT}	11–9 (6–5)	Dahlberg Arena (3,152); Missoula, MT
02/08/2014; 7:00 pm	Eastern Washington	W 82–77	12–9 (7–5)	Dahlberg Arena (4,016); Missoula, MT
02/13/2014; 7:00 pm	at Northern Colorado	L 86–89 ^{OT}	12–10 (7–6)	Butler–Hancock Sports Pavilion (2,453); Greenley, CO
02/15/2014; 1:00 pm	at North Dakota	L 69–74	12–11 (7–7)	Betty Engelstad Sioux Center (2,033); Grand Forks, ND
02/20/2014; 7:00 pm	Weber State	W 68–57	13–11 (8–7)	Dahlberg Arena (3,530); Missoula, MT
02/22/2014; 7:00 pm	Idaho State	W 62–61	14–11 (9–7)	Dahlberg Arena (4,009); Missoula, MT
03/01/2014; 7:00 pm	Southern Utah	W 82–54	15–11 (10–7)	Dahlberg Arena (3,619); Missoula, MT
03/03/2014; 7:00 pm	Montana State	W 53–50	16–11 (11–7)	Dahlberg Arena (4,606); Missoula, MT
03/06/2014; 8:00 pm	at Sacramento State	W 70–55	17–11 (12–7)	Colberg Court (1,146); Sacramento, CA
03/08/2014; 3:00 pm	at Northern Arizona	L 47–67	17–12 (12–8)	Walkup Skydome (1,801); Fkagstaff
Big Sky tournament
03/13/2014; 7:00 pm	Portland State; Quarterfinals	L 63–70	17–13	Dee Events Center (N/A); Ogden, UT
*Non-conference game. ^{#}Rankings from AP Poll. (#) Tournament seedings in parentheses. All times are in Mountain Time.

== See also ==
2013–14 Montana Lady Griz basketball team
