= 2013–14 Arizona Wildcats men's basketball team =

American college basketball season

2013–14 Arizona Wildcats men's basketball

Pac-12 regular season champions NIT Season Tip-Off champions

NCAA tournament, Elite Eight
- Conference: Pac-12 Conference

Ranking
- Coaches: No. 5
- AP: No. 4
- Record: 33–5 (15–3 Pac-12)
- Head coach: Sean Miller (5th season)
- Assistant coaches: Joe Pasternack; Emanuel Richardson; Damon Stoudamire
- Home arena: McKale Center

2013–14 Pac-12 Conference men's basketball standings
	Conf.				Overall
Team	W		L	PCT	W		L	PCT
No. 4 Arizona	15	–	3	.833	33	–	5	.868
No. 20 UCLA †	12	–	6	.667	28	–	9	.757
Oregon	10	–	8	.556	24	–	10	.706
Colorado	10	–	8	.556	23	–	12	.657
Arizona State	10	–	8	.556	21	–	12	.636
Stanford	10	–	8	.556	23	–	13	.639
California	10	–	8	.556	21	–	14	.600
Utah	9	–	9	.500	21	–	12	.636
Washington	9	–	9	.500	17	–	15	.531
Oregon State	8	–	10	.444	16	–	16	.500
Washington State	3	–	15	.167	10	–	21	.323
USC	2	–	16	.111	11	–	21	.344
† Conference tournament winner Rankings from AP poll

The 2013–14 Arizona Wildcats men's basketball team represented the University of Arizona during the 2013–14 NCAA Division I men's basketball season. The team was led by fifth-year head coach Sean Miller and played home games at McKale Center in Tucson, Arizona as a member of the Pac-12 Conference. They finished the season 33–5, 15–3 in Pac-12 play and won their first Pac-12 regular season championship since 2011 (the 13th time overall). They advanced to the championship game of the Pac-12 tournament where they lost to UCLA. They received an at-large bid to the NCAA tournament where they defeated Weber State, Gonzaga, and San Diego State to advance to the Elite Eight where they lost to Wisconsin.

== Previous season ==
Arizona's 2012–13 team finished with a record of 27–8 after advancing to the NCAA tournament's Sweet Sixteen. The team went 12–6 in the Pac-12 regular season, putting them in a three-way tie for second place. In the Pac-12 tournament, the team defeated Colorado to advance to the semifinals, where they lost to UCLA. Ranked 21st in the post-season AP poll, the Cats were seeded 6th in the West Region of the NCAA tournament. Arizona won its first two tournament games, defeating 11-seed Belmont and 14-seed Harvard, before falling to 2-seed Ohio State in the regional semifinals.

== Off-season ==
=== Departures ===
Name	Pos.	Height	Weight	Year	Hometown	Notes
Solomon Hill	SF	6'7"	220	Senior	Los Angeles, CA	Selected 23rd overall by the Indiana Pacers in the 2013 NBA draft after graduation
Kevin Parrom	G/F	6'6"	220	Senior	The Bronx, NY	Graduated
Max Wiepking	SF	6'6"	220	Senior	Englewood, CO	Walk-on; graduated
Quinton Crawford	SG	6'2"	200	Senior	Old Bridge, NJ	Walk-on; graduated
Mark Lyons	PG	6'1"	200	Senior	Schenectady, NY	Signed with French Pro A team Choral Roanne
Angelo Chol	PF	6'9"	225	Sophomore	San Diego, CA	Transferred to San Diego State after spring 2013 classes
Grant Jerrett	PF	6'10"	235	Freshman	La Verne, CA	Drafted 40th overall by the Portland Trail Blazers; later traded to the Oklahoma City Thunder

=== Incoming transfers ===
Name	Number	Pos.	Height	Weight	Year	Hometown	Notes
Chris Johnson	52	G	6'6"	210	Junior	Gilbert, AZ	The older brother of Nick Johnson joins the team as a walk-on.
Zach Peters	33	PF	6'10"	238	Freshman	Plano, TX	The NCAA granted Peters four years of eligibility without requiring him to sit out in light of medical issues that kept him from playing while at Kansas and led to his withdrawal after the fall 2013 semester.

- Point guard T. J. McConnell and center Matt Korcheck first played for Arizona in 2013–14 after redshirting the previous season. McConnell, a Duquesne transfer and the nephew of Women's Basketball Hall of Fame member Suzie McConnell Serio, was required to sit out 2012–13 under NCAA transfer rules. Korcheck was eligible to play as a junior college transfer but arranged with Miller to redshirt given Arizona's front-court depth. Both had two years of eligibility remaining after redshirting.

=== 2013 recruiting class ===
Arizona recruits at the 2013 McDonald's All-American Boys Game

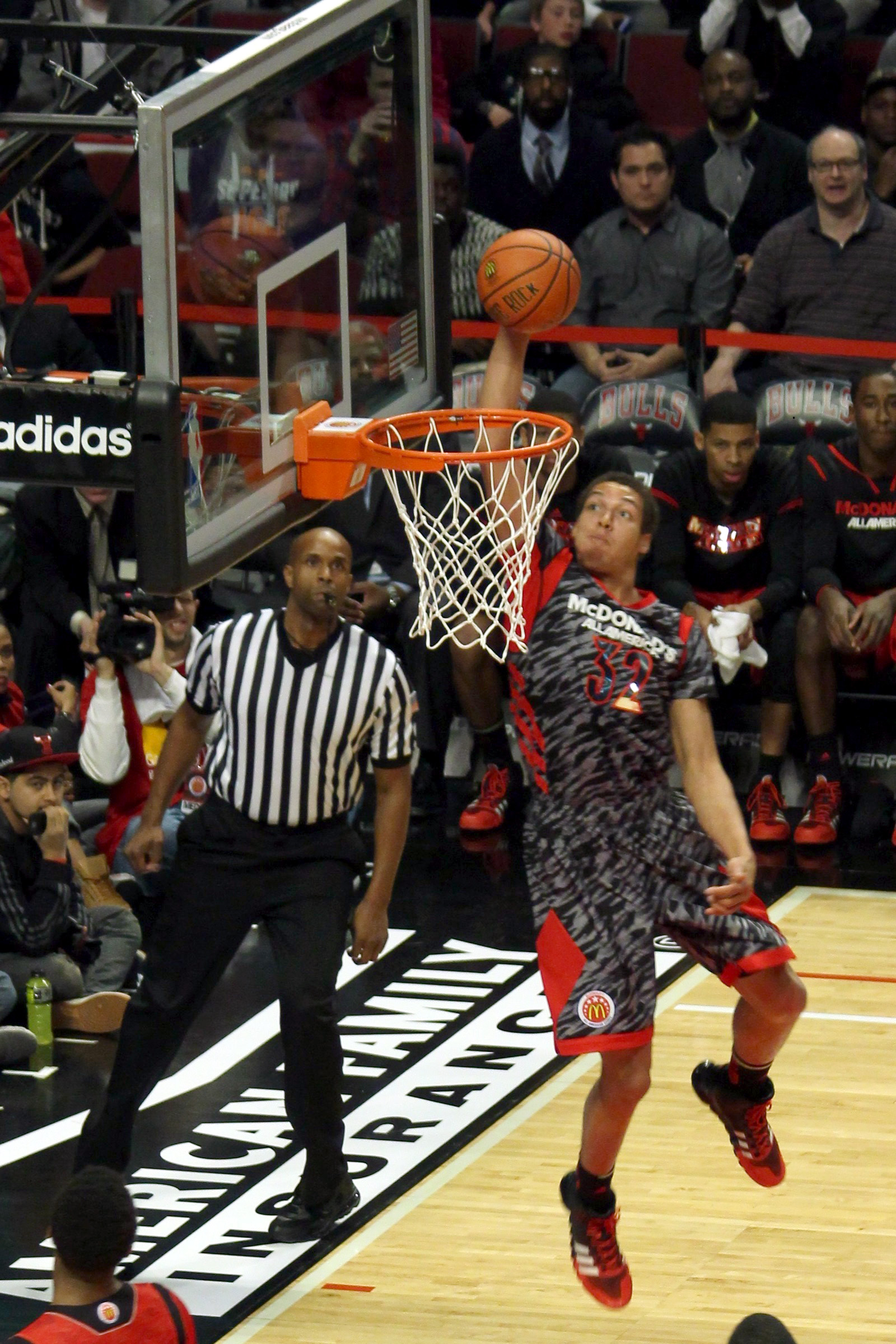
Aaron Gordon

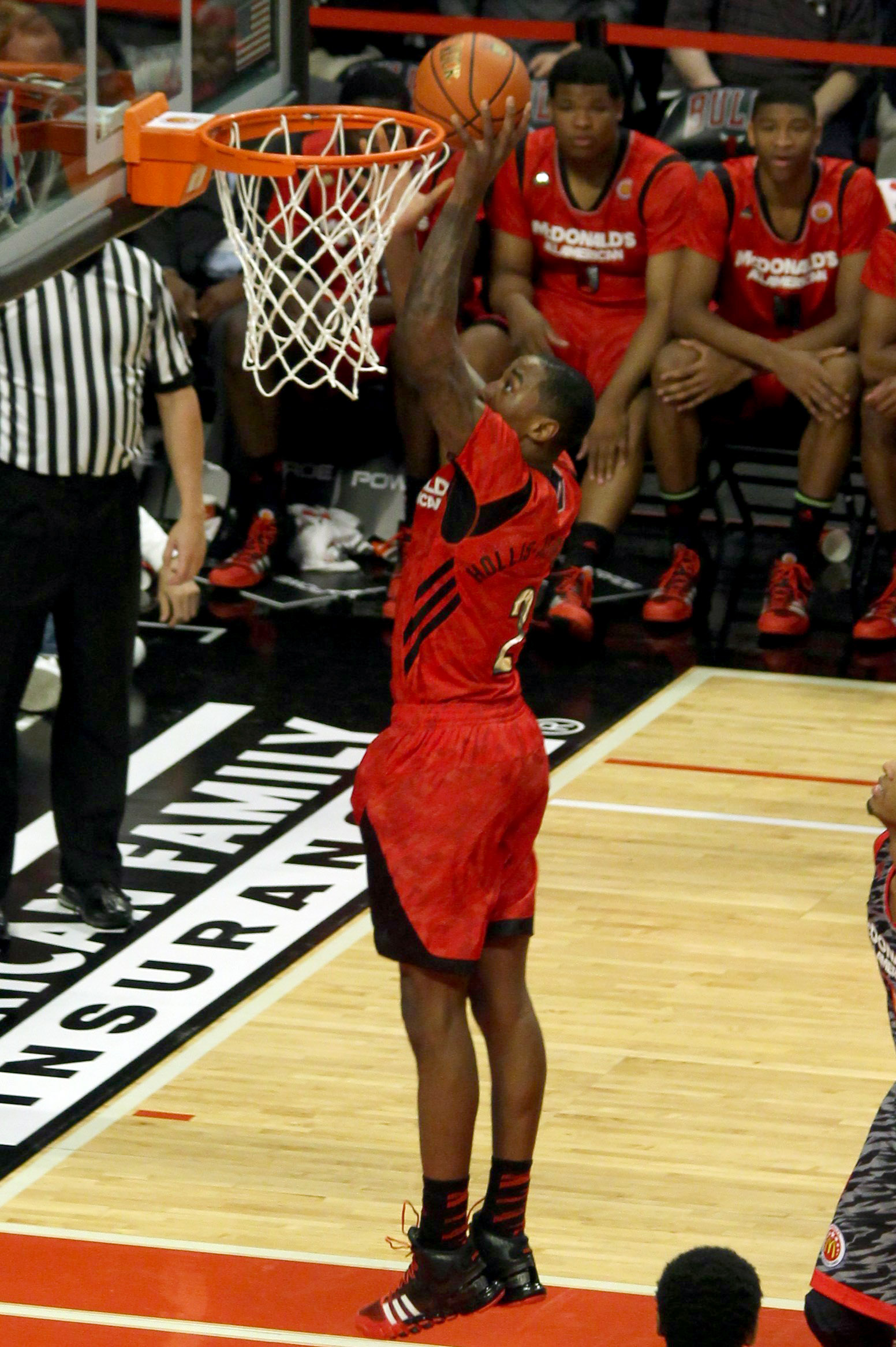
Rondae Hollis-Jefferson

College recruiting information
Name	Hometown	School	Height	Weight	Commit date
Aaron Gordon; F	San Jose, CA	Archbishop Mitty High School	6 ft 8 in (2.03 m)	210 lb (95 kg)	Apr 2, 2013
Aaron Gordon; F	Recruit ratings: Rivals: 247Sports: ESPN: (96)				
Rondae Hollis-Jefferson; F	Chester, PA	Chester High School	6 ft 7 in (2.01 m)	215 lb (98 kg)	Sep 13, 2012
Rondae Hollis-Jefferson; F	Recruit ratings: Rivals: 247Sports: ESPN: (92)				
Elliott Pitts; G	Dublin, CA	De La Salle High School	6 ft 5 in (1.96 m)	190 lb (86 kg)	Aug 12, 2012
Elliott Pitts; G	Recruit ratings: Rivals: 247Sports: ESPN: (82)				
Eric Conklin; F	Scottsdale, AZ	Chaparral High School	6 ft 6 in (1.98 m)	240 lb (110 kg)	May 11, 2013
Eric Conklin; F	Recruit ratings: ESPN: (58)				
Overall recruit ranking: Scout: #4 Rivals: #4 ESPN: #5
Note: In many cases, Scout, Rivals, 247Sports, On3, and ESPN may conflict in their listings of height and weight.; In these cases, the average was taken. ESPN grades are on a 100-point scale.; Sources: "Arizona 2013 Basketball Commitments". Rivals.; "2013 Arizona Basketball Commits". Scout.; "ESPN". ESPN.; "Scout.com Team Recruiting Rankings". Scout.; "2013 Team Ranking". Rivals.

== Roster ==
2013–14 Arizona Wildcats men's basketball team
Players
Coaches

Pos.	#	Name	Height	Weight	Year	Previous school	Hometown
G	1	Gabe York	6 ft 3 in (1.91 m)	180 lb (82 kg)	So	Orange Lutheran	Orange, CA
G	4	T. J. McConnell	6 ft 1 in (1.85 m)	195 lb (88 kg)	RS Jr	Chartiers Valley/Duquesne	Pittsburgh, PA
F	11	Aaron Gordon	6 ft 9 in (2.06 m)	225 lb (102 kg)	Fr	Archbishop Mitty	San Jose, CA
G	13	Nick Johnson	6 ft 3 in (1.91 m)	200 lb (91 kg)	Jr	Findlay Prep	Gilbert, AZ
G	20	Jordin Mayes	6 ft 3 in (1.91 m)	190 lb (86 kg)	Sr	Westchester	Los Angeles, CA
F	21	Brandon Ashley (injured)	6 ft 8 in (2.03 m)	230 lb (104 kg)	So	Findlay Prep	Oakland, CA
F	23	Rondae Hollis-Jefferson	6 ft 7 in (2.01 m)	215 lb (98 kg)	Fr	Chester	Chester, PA
G	24	Elliott Pitts	6 ft 5 in (1.96 m)	180 lb (82 kg)	Fr	De La Salle	Dublin, CA
F/C	31	Matt Korcheck	6 ft 10 in (2.08 m)	230 lb (104 kg)	RS Jr	Sabino/Cochise College	Tucson, AZ
F/C	33	Zach Peters	6 ft 10 in (2.08 m)	240 lb (109 kg)	RS Fr	Prestonwood Christian/Kansas	Plano, TX
C	35	Kaleb Tarczewski	7 ft 0 in (2.13 m)	235 lb (107 kg)	So	St. Mark's School	Claremont, NH
G	44	Trey Mason (W)	6 ft 2 in (1.88 m)	185 lb (84 kg)	Fr	Loyola	Los Angeles, CA
G	50	Jacob Hazzard (W)	6 ft 0 in (1.83 m)	160 lb (73 kg)	So	Loyola	Los Angeles, CA
F	52	Chris Johnson (W)	6 ft 6 in (1.98 m)	215 lb (98 kg)	RS Jr	South Kent/CSU San Bernardino	Gilbert, AZ
F	54	Eric Conklin (W)	6 ft 6 in (1.98 m)	235 lb (107 kg)	Fr	Chaparral	Scottsdale, AZ
F	55	Drew Mellon (W)	6 ft 6 in (1.98 m)	205 lb (93 kg)	Jr	Mater Dei	Santa Ana, CA

Head coach

- Sean Miller (Pittsburgh)

Assistant coach(es)

- Joe Pasternack (Indiana)
- Emanuel Richardson (Pitt–Johnstown)
- Damon Stoudamire (Arizona)

Legend

- (C) Team captain
- (S) Suspended
- (I) Ineligible
- (W) Walk-on
- Injured
- Current redshirt

Roster
Last update: July 10, 2024

=== Depth chart ===
- before February 1

Pos.	Starting 5	Bench 1	Bench 2	Bench 3
C	Kaleb Tarczewski	Matt Korcheck
PF	Brandon Ashley	Zach Peters	Eric Conklin
SF	Aaron Gordon	Rondae Hollis-Jefferson	Drew Mellon	Chris Johnson
SG	Nick Johnson	Gabe York	Elliott Pitts	Trey Mason
PG	T. J. McConnell	Jordin Mayes	Jacob Hazzard

- after February 1

Pos.	Starting 5	Bench 1	Bench 2	Bench 3
C	Kaleb Tarczewski	Matt Korcheck
PF	Aaron Gordon	Zach Peters	Eric Conklin
SF	Rondae Hollis-Jefferson	Elliott Pitts	Drew Mellon	Chris Johnson
SG	Nick Johnson	Gabe York	Trey Mason
PG	T. J. McConnell	Jordin Mayes	Jacob Hazzard

== Schedule ==
Arizona's thirteen-game non-conference schedule had two road games, two neutral-site games, and nine home games. The team spent Thanksgiving in New York City for the 2013 NIT Season Tip-Off semifinal and championship rounds held at Madison Square Garden. Arizona was one of four regional hosts for the NIT Tip-Off's first and second rounds, the others being Duke, Alabama, and Rutgers.

In the unbalanced 18-game Pac-12 schedule, the Cats faced neither the Washington schools on the road nor the Los Angeles schools at home.

Date time, TV	Rank^{#}	Opponent^{#}	Result	Record	Site (attendance) city, state
Exhibition
10/28/2013; 7:00 p.m., P12N		Augustana	W 84–52	–	McKale Center (13,340); Tucson, AZ
Non-conference regular season
11/08/2013*; 8:00 p.m., P12N	No. 6	Cal Poly	W 73–62	1–0	McKale Center (14,545); Tucson, AZ
11/11/2013*; 8:00 p.m., P12N	No. 6	Long Beach State	W 91–57	2–0	McKale Center (14,087); Tucson, AZ
11/14/2013*; 8:05 p.m., CBSSN	No. 6	at San Diego State	W 69–60	3–0	Viejas Arena (12,414); San Diego, CA
11/18/2013*; 9:00 p.m., ESPNU	No. 5	Fairleigh Dickinson; NIT Season Tip-Off campus-site game	W 100–50	4–0	McKale Center (13,529); Tucson, AZ
11/19/2013*; 9:00 p.m., ESPNU	No. 5	Rhode Island; NIT Season Tip-Off campus-site game	W 87–59	5–0	McKale Center (13,354); Tucson, AZ
11/27/2013*; 5:00 p.m., ESPNU	No. 4	vs. Drexel; NIT Season Tip-Off Semifinals	W 66–62	6–0	Madison Square Garden (8,741); New York, NY
11/29/2013*; 4:00 p.m., ESPN	No. 4	vs. No. 6 Duke; NIT Season Tip-Off championship	W 72–66	7–0	Madison Square Garden (13,266); New York, NY
12/03/2013*; 7:00 p.m., P12N	No. 2	Texas Tech	W 79–58	8–0	McKale Center (14,545); Tucson, AZ
12/07/2013*; 3:15 p.m., ESPN2	No. 2	UNLV	W 63–58	9–0	McKale Center (14,545); Tucson, AZ
12/11/2013*; 7:00 p.m., P12N	No. 1	New Mexico State	W 74–48	10–0	McKale Center (14,545); Tucson, AZ
12/14/2013*; 10:00 a.m., CBS	No. 1	at No. 25 Michigan	W 72–70	11–0	Crisler Center (12,707); Ann Arbor, MI
12/19/2013*; 7:00 p.m., P12N	No. 1	Southern	W 69–43	12–0	McKale Center (14,149); Tucson, AZ
12/23/2013*; 8:00 p.m., P12N	No. 1	Northern Arizona	W 77–44	13–0	McKale Center (14,545); Tucson, AZ
Pac-12 regular season
01/02/2014; 8:00 p.m., P12N	No. 1	Washington State	W 60–25	14–0 (1–0)	McKale Center (14,545); Tucson, AZ
01/04/2014; 12:00 p.m., P12N	No. 1	Washington	W 71–62	15–0 (2–0)	McKale Center (14,545); Tucson, AZ
01/09/2014; 7:00 p.m., ESPN	No. 1	at UCLA; Rivalry	W 79–75	16–0 (3–0)	Pauley Pavilion (13,283); Los Angeles, CA
01/12/2014; 7:00 p.m., P12N	No. 1	at USC	W 73–53	17–0 (4–0)	Galen Center (8,347); Los Angeles, CA
01/16/2014; 7:00 p.m., FS1	No. 1	Arizona State; Rivalry	W 91–68	18–0 (5–0)	McKale Center (14,545); Tucson, AZ
01/23/2014; 7:00 p.m., ESPN2	No. 1	Colorado	W 69–57	19–0 (6–0)	McKale Center (14,545); Tucson, AZ
01/26/2014; 6:00 p.m., FS1	No. 1	Utah	W 65–56	20–0 (7–0)	McKale Center (14,545); Tucson, AZ
01/29/2014; 7:00 p.m., ESPN2	No. 1	at Stanford	W 60–57	21–0 (8–0)	Maples Pavilion (7,233); Stanford, CA
02/01/2014; 8:30 p.m., P12N	No. 1	at California	L 58–60	21–1 (8–1)	Haas Pavilion (11,877); Berkeley, CA
02/06/2014; 7:00 p.m., ESPN	No. 2	Oregon	W 67–65	22–1 (9–1)	McKale Center (14,545); Tucson, AZ
02/09/2014; 5:00 p.m., P12N	No. 2	Oregon State	W 76–54	23–1 (10–1)	McKale Center (14,545); Tucson, AZ
02/14/2014; 7:00 p.m., ESPN	No. 2	at Arizona State; Rivalry	L 66–69 ^{2OT}	23–2 (10–2)	Wells Fargo Arena (10,699); Tempe, AZ
02/19/2014; 8:00 p.m., FS1	No. 4	at Utah	W 67–63 ^{OT}	24–2 (11–2)	Huntsman Center (14,266); Salt Lake City, UT
02/22/2014; 7:00 p.m., ESPN	No. 4	at Colorado; College GameDay	W 88–61	25–2 (12–2)	Coors Events Center (11,025); Boulder, CO
02/26/2014; 7:00 p.m., ESPN2	No. 3	California	W 87–59	26–2 (13–2)	McKale Center (14,545); Tucson, AZ
03/02/2014; 6:00 p.m., ESPNU	No. 3	Stanford	W 79–66	27–2 (14–2)	McKale Center (14,545); Tucson, AZ
03/05/2014; 9:00 p.m., FS1	No. 3	at Oregon State	W 74–69	28–2 (15–2)	Gill Coliseum (5,651); Corvallis, OR
03/08/2014; 2:00 p.m., CBS	No. 3	at Oregon	L 57–64	28–3 (15–3)	Matthew Knight Arena (12,364); Eugene, OR
Pac-12 tournament
03/13/2014; 12:00 p.m., P12N	(1) No. 4	vs. (8) Utah; Quarterfinals	W 71–39	29–3	MGM Grand Garden Arena (N/A); Paradise, NV
03/14/2014; 6:00 p.m., P12N	(1) No. 4	vs. (5) Colorado; Semifinals	W 63–43	30–3	MGM Grand Garden Arena (12,916); Paradise, NV
03/15/2014; 3:00 p.m., FS1	(1) No. 4	vs. (2) UCLA; Championship	L 71–75	30–4	MGM Grand Garden Arena (12,916); Paradise, NV
NCAA tournament
03/21/2014*; 12:10 p.m., TNT	(1 W) No. 4	vs. (16 W) Weber State; First round	W 68–59	31–4	Viejas Arena (11,196); San Diego, CA
03/23/2014*; 6:40 p.m., TBS	(1 W) No. 4	vs. (8 W) Gonzaga; Second round	W 84–61	32–4	Viejas Arena (11,504); San Diego, CA
03/27/2014*; 8:17 p.m., TBS	(1 W) No. 4	vs. (4 W) No. 13 San Diego State; Sweet Sixteen	W 70–64	33–4	Honda Center (17,773); Anaheim, CA
03/29/2014*; 5:49 p.m., TBS	(1 W) No. 4	vs. (2 W) No. 12 Wisconsin; Elite Eight	L 63–64 ^{OT}	33–5	Honda Center (17,814); Anaheim, CA
*Non-conference game. ^{#}Rankings from AP poll, W=West Region. (#) Tournament seedings in parentheses. All times are in Mountain.

== Ranking movement ==
Legend: ██ Increase in ranking ██ Decrease in ranking
Poll	Pre	Wk 2	Wk 3	Wk 4	Wk 5	Wk 6	Wk 7	Wk 8	Wk 9	Wk 10	Wk 11	Wk 12	Wk 13	Wk 14	Wk 15	Wk 16	Wk 17	Wk 18	Wk 19	Post	Final
AP	6	6	5	4	2	1	1	1	1	1	1	1	1	2	2	4	3	3	4	4	N/A
Coaches	5	5	4	3	2	1	1	1	1	1	1	1	1	3	3	4	3	3	4	5	5

== Team statistics ==
Player	GP	GS	MPG	FGM-FGA	3PM–3PA	FTM–FTA	RPG	APG	SPG	BPG	PPG
Brandon Ashley	22	22	27.7	93–178	11–29	56–74	5.8	1.0	0.6	0.7	11.5
Eric Conklin	7	0	2.4	2–2	0–0	0–0	0.1	0	0	0	0.6
Aaron Gordon	38	38	31.2	189–382	16–45	76–180	8.0	1.97	0.89	1.0	12.4
Jacob Hazzard	13	0	2.2	8–17	4–9	0–0	0.2	0.2	0.1	0	1.5
Rondae Hollis-Jefferson	38	6	25.3	121–247	2–10	103–151	5.7	1.4	0.7	1.0	9.1
Nick Johnson	38	38	33.0	205–474	62–169	146–187	4.1	2.8	1.1	0.66	16.3
Matt Korecheck	22	0	4.6	8–12	0–0	8–12	1.4	0.1	0.1	0.2	1.1
Trey Mason	10	0	2.2	2–3	1–1	0–0	0.3	0.3	0	0	0.5
Jordin Mayes	34	1	5.7	15–45	3–15	11–17	0.5	0.5	0.3	0	1.3
T. J. McConnell	38	38	32.2	127–280	36–100	31–50	3.6	5.3	1.7	0.2	8.4
Drew Mellon	6	0	2.0	0–1	0–0	1–2	0.2	0.2	0	0	0.2
Zach Peters	11	0	2.8	0–6	0–6	0–0	0.4	0	0	0	0
Elliott Pitts	24	0	8.4	15–35	11–28	3–8	1.0	0.3	0.2	0	1.8
Kaleb Tarczewski	36	35	28.3	128–219	0–0	102–135	6.3	0.5	0.1	1.0	9.9
Gabe York	38	12	21.8	82–221	57–148	35–52	2.2	1.6	0.5	0.1	6.7
Chris Johnson	4	0	6.0	1–1	1–1	1–2	0	0	0	0	1.0

== Awards ==
Aaron Gordon

- Freshman student-athlete of the year
- AP Honorable Mention
- 2013: USA Basketball Male Athlete of the Year
- Individual All-America teams
- 2014 NCAA tournament's West Regional all-tournament team
- Third All-America Team– Sporting News
- USBWA All-District team
- NABC All District Second Team
- Pac-12 All-Freshman Team
- Pac-12 First Team
- Pac–12 Freshman of the Year
- 2013 NIT Season Tip-Off All-Tournament Team
- CBS Sports and U.S. Basketball Writers Association Freshman of the Week honors

Nick Johnson

- Junior student-athlete of the year
- Wooden All-American team
- AP All-American second team
- 2014 NCAA tournament's West Regional all-tournament team
- First team All-American – TSN, USBWA
- Consensus All-American – USBWA, NABC, Sporting News
- USBWA All-District team
- NABC All District First Team
- USBWA District IX Player of the Year
- Pac-12 First Team
- Pac-12 All-Defense Team
- Pac-12 Player of the Year
- 2013 NIT Season Tip-Off MVP, All-Tournament Team
- Pac-12 Player of the Week (December 2, 2013)

Rondae Hollis-Jefferson

- Pac-12 All-Freshman Team
- Freshman student-athlete of the year

Kaleb Tarczewski

- Sophomore student-athlete of the year

T. J. McConnell

- Pac-12 Second Team
- Pac-12 All-Defensive Team

Head Coach Sean Miller

- USBWA District IX Coach of the Year
- Pac-10/12 John R. Wooden Coach of the Year
