= Brad Huse =

American basketball player and coach (born 1966)

Bradley Richard Huse (born June 27, 1966) is an American college basketball coach and the former head men's basketball coach at Montana State University. On April 4, 2006, he was hired following the departure of Mick Durham.

A three-time conference coach of the year at the NAIA level and a Division I assistant, Huse's first Bobcats squad compiled an 11–19 record. MSU finished 8–8 in the Big Sky in 2007. Huse sandwiched eight highly successful years as head coach at North Dakota's Jamestown College with two-year stints as an assistant at Montana State (1994–96) and Montana (2004–06). He rolled up a 184–60 record with the Jimmies, leading that squad to championships in five of his eight years there.

Huse played basketball at Montana Tech, first for Kelvin Sampson and later for Rick Dessing, who coached in the Frontier Conference. Huse was a three-time All-Frontier Conference honoree and earned NAIA All-America honors as a senior.

After three years as an engineer, Huse returned to Tech to work on the Diggers' coaching staff, and after three years on Dessing's bench, Huse joined Mick Durham's coaching staff at Montana State in 1994.

Huse's arrival coincided with one of the finest two-year runs in Bobcat basketball history. MSU posted its first 20-win season in nearly a decade in 1994–95, Huse's first as a Bobcat assistant. The next year, MSU rolled up a 21–9 record, winning the Big Sky regular season title and the Big Sky tourney title.

After MSU's championship season, Huse landed the head coaching job at Jamestown College. After leading the Jimmies to 17–10 and 19–9 records in his first two seasons, the program took off. Jamestown won at least 20 games in each of Huse's final half-dozen campaigns there, improving in each of the last four seasons and culminating in a 30–3 record in 2003–04. That year, Jamestown won the DAC 10 tournament and regular season titles for the third straight year, finishing 18–0 in conference play. Jamestown finished 52–2 in league play from 2002 to 2004.

During the post-season, Huse led the Jimmies to the NAIA national tournament four times. His 2003–04 squad spent the regular season ranked first in the nation, and he took one team to the Elite Eight. The three-time DAC–10 Coach of the Year also served as the school's athletic director from 2000 to 2004.

In the fall of 2004, Huse returned to his hometown to serve on Larry Krystkowiak's first Montana coaching staff, and became part of UM's basketball renaissance. The Grizzlies won the Big Sky Tournament in each of Huse's two seasons, and in the spring of 2006 the Grizzlies advanced to the second round of the NCAA Tournament with a first-round win over Nevada.

Less than two months later, Montana State tapped Huse to replace one of his mentors, the retiring Mick Durham, whose 16 years on the Bobcat bench produced the most wins in Big Sky Conference history.

The Missoula native earned All-Frontier Conference honors three times at Tech and NAIA All-America kudos as a senior. During his 15-year career as an assistant or head coach, Huse's squad has won conference titles nine times. In addition to his engineering degree from Montana Tech, Huse holds a master's degree in education from MSU.

Huse's father Dick, who played football at Montana, is retired after a high school officiating career. One of Huse's brothers, Thad, played football at Montana from 1988 to '91, and the other, Shawn, is currently Montana State University-Northern's head men's basketball coach. Huse's wife Kelly (Sauvageau) played volleyball at Montana Tech, and is a health and physical education teacher in Bozeman, Montana. They have three sons — Adam, Drew and Ty.

== Head coaching record ==
Record table
| Season | Team | Overall | Conference | Standing | Postseason |
|---|---|---|---|---|---|
Montana State Bobcats (Big Sky Conference) (2006–2014)
| 2006–07 | Montana State | 11–19 | 8–8 | T–5th | |
| 2007–08 | Montana State | 15–15 | 7–9 | 6th | |
| 2008–09 | Montana State | 14–17 | 6–10 | T–6th | |
| 2009–10 | Montana State | 15–14 | 10–6 | T–3rd | |
| 2010–11 | Montana State | 13–18 | 7–9 | T–5th | |
| 2011–12 | Montana State | 12–17 | 7–9 | T–5th | |
| 2012–13 | Montana State | 13–16 | 10–10 | T–4th | |
| 2013–14 | Montana State | 14–17 | 9–11 | 9th | |
| Montana State: | | 107–133 (.446) | 64–72 (.471) | | |
| Total: | | 107–133 (.446) | | | |
National champion Postseason invitational champion Conference regular season champion Conference regular season and conference tournament champion Division regular season champion Division regular season and conference tournament champion Conference tournament champion
