= 2014 Big Sky Conference men's basketball tournament =

- Classification: Division I
- Season: 2013–14
- Teams: 7
- Site: Dee Events Center; Ogden, Utah
- Champions: Weber State (9th title)
- Winning coach: Randy Rahe (2nd title)
- MVP: Davion Berry (Weber State)
- Television: ESPNU (final)

2013–14 Big Sky men's basketball standings
	Conf.				Overall
Team	W		L	PCT	W		L	PCT
Weber State †	14	–	6	.700	19	–	12	.613
Montana	12	–	8	.600	17	–	13	.567
North Dakota	12	–	8	.600	17	–	17	.500
Northern Arizona	12	–	8	.600	15	–	17	.469
Northern Colorado	11	–	9	.550	18	–	14	.563
Portland State	11	–	9	.550	17	–	15	.531
Eastern Washington	10	–	10	.500	15	–	16	.484
Sacramento State	10	–	10	.500	14	–	16	.467
Montana State	9	–	11	.450	14	–	17	.452
Idaho State	8	–	12	.400	11	–	18	.379
Southern Utah	1	–	19	.050	2	–	27	.069
† Conference tournament winner

The 2014 Big Sky Conference men's basketball tournament ran from March 14–16, 2014. The champion Weber State Wildcats received an automatic bid to the 2014 NCAA tournament.

== Format ==
Unlike most Division I conference tournaments in basketball, the Big Sky tournament does not involve all of the conference's teams. With the addition of North Dakota and Southern Utah to the conference for the 2012–13 season, expanding the number of teams from 9 to 11, the tournament expanded from six teams to seven. As in previous years, qualifying was based on overall conference record. The number of teams that failed to qualify also increased by one, going from three to four. All tournament games were played at the site of the regular-season champion. The men's tournament also returned to a Thursday-Friday-Saturday format. The field was re-seeded after the first round so the #1 seed played the lowest remaining seed, while the highest remaining seeds faced off in the other semifinal.

== Bracket ==
Quarterfinals; Thursday, March 13
1	Weber State
Bye
4	Montana	63
5	Portland State	70
(Pairings are reseeded after the first round)
2	North Dakota	79
7	Sacramento State	76
3	Northern Arizona	60
6	Northern Colorado	62

Semifinals; Friday, March 14 (re-seeded)
1	Weber State	66^{OT}
6	Northern Colorado	63
2	North Dakota	79
5	Portland State	63

Championship; Saturday, March 15; ESPNU
1	Weber State	88
2	North Dakota	67
