= Emanuel Richardson =

American basketball coach

Playing career
- 1992–1993: Florida Atlantic
- 1994–1995: Monroe College
- 1996–1998: Pittsburgh–Johnstown
- Position: Point guard

Coaching career (HC unless noted)
- 1998–1999: Pitt-Johnstown (assoc. HC)
- 2001–2004: Monroe College (asst.)
- 2004–2005: Marist (asst.)
- 2007–2009: Xavier (asst.)
- 2009–2017: Arizona (asst.)

Emanuel "Book" Richardson is a former American college basketball coach most recently an assistant coach for the Arizona Wildcats men's basketball program, where he had been since the 2009–10 season. He has previously been an assistant coach at Xavier, Marist College, Monroe College, and the University of Pittsburgh at Johnstown, his alma mater. Richardson has had head-coaching experience at the high school level with the Amateur Athletic Union (AAU) New York Gauchos.

== Playing career ==
Growing up in Harlem and the South Bronx Richardson played high school basketball at Riverside Church and St. Raymond High School for Boys.

Richardson played his freshman year at Florida Atlantic University where he collected 81 assists and earned a place on the 1993 Trans-American Conference all-freshman team. He next played for Monroe College in the 1994–95 season where he averaged 11.3 assists per game and led the team to a record of 28–3. He finished his playing career at the University of Pittsburgh at Johnstown where he led all NCAA Division II players in assists in both his junior and senior years, recording 8.7 apg and 9.0 apg respectively.

== Coaching career ==
=== High School and AAU ===
Richardson was the head coach for the AAU New York Gauchos U-16 team in 2003. From 2002 to 2004 he was an assistant coach at St. Raymond's before returning to the Gauchos as director and coach from 2005 to 2007.

Richardson coached the USA Basketball U-18 Red team to the gold medal at the 2007 USAB Men's Youth Development Festival. He was the youngest head coach ever to do so and the first AAU coach to be selected as a festival head coach by USA Basketball.

=== Collegiate ===
After graduating in 1998 from Pitt-Johnstown with a degree in business marketing and management Richardson became the associate head coach of the school's 1998–99 Mountain Cats men's basketball team, which recorded a program-best record of 23–4.

From 2001 to 2004 Richardson was an assistant coach at Monroe College, whose 2002–03 team went 31–3 and finished fifth in the NJCAA tournament. He was an assistant coach at Marist College for the 2004–05 season.

Richardson was an assistant coach at Xavier for two seasons, starting in 2007, before following the Musketeers' head coach Sean Miller to Arizona in 2009. Richardson took two months of medical leave from his position at Arizona prior to the start of the 2013–14 season.

== Personal life ==
=== Arrest & indictment ===
In Manhattan on September 26, 2017, the acting United States Attorney for the Southern District of New York Joon H. Kim announced the arrest of Richardson for federal bribery, fraud, and other corruption charges. Kim stated that, (federal authorities) had been investigating “the criminal influence of money on coaches and student-athletes who participate in intercollegiate basketball governed by the NCAA” Besides Arizona, the Division I universities of Auburn, Oklahoma State and USC, as well as a senior executive at sportswear manufacturer Adidas, were also implicated. In addition to the alleged bribes taken by assistant coaches, some unnamed student-athletes' families also accepted money. The indictments describe wire fraud and money laundering where collegiate students were enticed to commit during college to work with specific agents and companies after they turned professional (NBA), or to convince coveted high schoolers to attend specific universities. Richardson was suspended with pay by the University of Arizona the day after his arrest.

Three separate indictments were filed.

(1) Case number 17-MAG-7119 in the United States District Court for the Southern District of New York is a sealed criminal complaint against Richardson, Lamont Evans (associate head basketball coach at Oklahoma State University), Anthony Bland (an assistant basketball coach at the University of Southern California), Christian Dawkins (an athletes' agent), and Munish Sood (CEO of Princeton Advisory Group).

(2) Chuck Person, an assistant coach at Auburn, was arrested on six counts; bribery conspiracy, solicitation of bribes and gratuities, conspiracy to commit honest services fraud, honest services wire fraud, conspiracy to commit wire fraud, and travel act conspiracy after allegedly accepting kickbacks for steering student-athletes to financial managers. Person was suspended without pay by Auburn University on the same day of his arrest.

(3) Adidas employee James Gatto and others (including Dawkins and Sood) were named as defendants in a separate complaint released the same day.

On January 11, 2018, UA fired assistant basketball coach Book Richardson after his appeal failed.
