= Bank of Colorado Arena =

Multi-Purpose Arena in Greeley, Colorado

Bank of Colorado Arena at Butler-Hancock Athletic Center
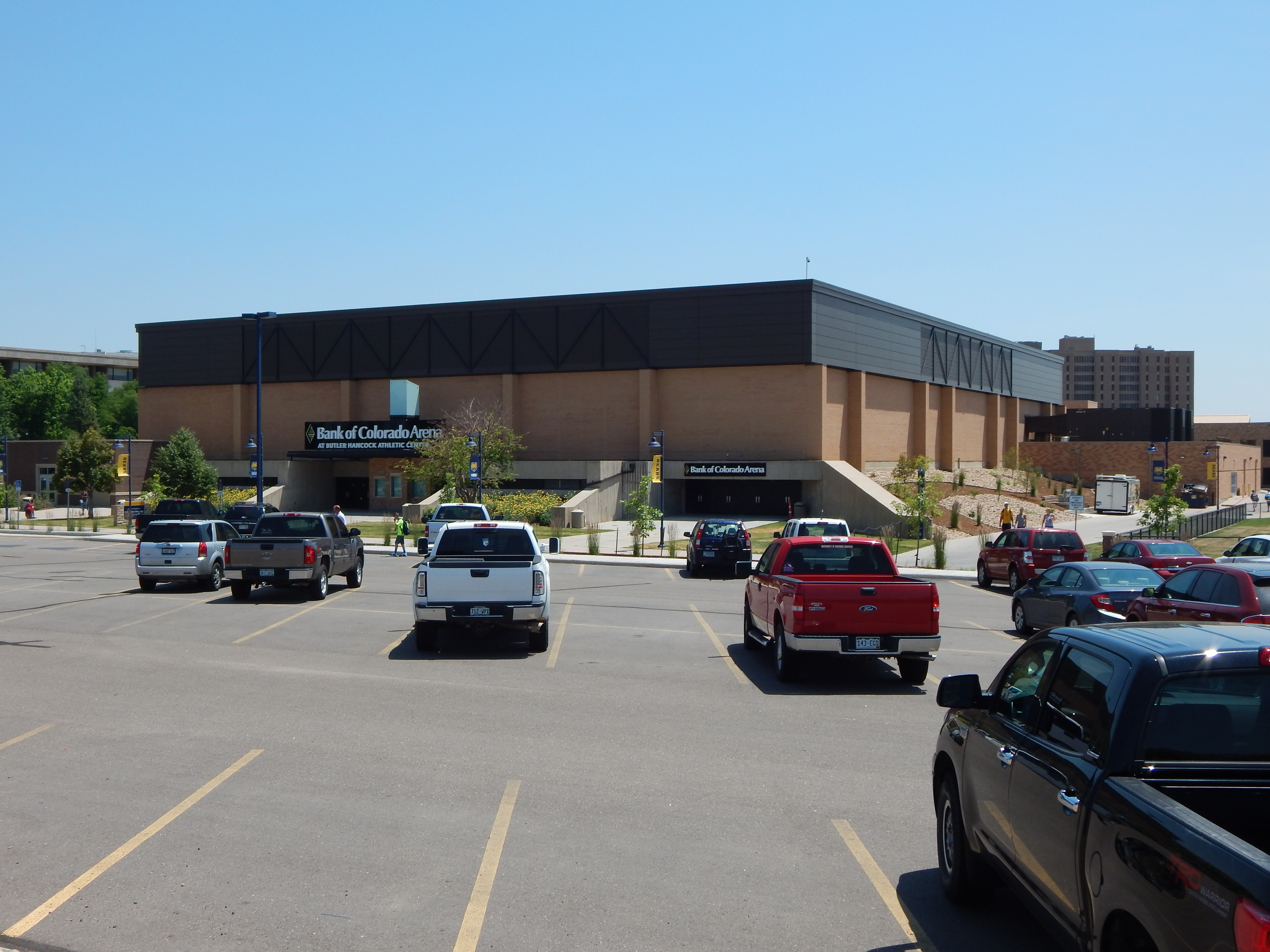
- Interactive map of Bank of Colorado Arena at Butler-Hancock Athletic Center
- Former names: Butler-Hancock Hall; Butler–Hancock Sports Pavilion
- Location: 270 Alles Drive; Greeley, CO 80639
- Coordinates: 40.4022171°N 104.7030436°W
- Owner: University of Northern Colorado
- Operator: University of Northern Colorado
- Capacity: 2,992 (2011–present); 2,941 (2006–2011); 4,500 (1975–2006)
- Surface: Hardwood

Construction
- Groundbreaking: 1974
- Opened: February 4, 1975
- Cost: $13.3 million (renovation)
- Architects: Lamar Kelsey and Associates

Tenant
- Northern Colorado Bears basketball (NCAA)

Bank of Colorado Arena at Butler-Hancock Athletic Center is a 2,992-seat multi-purpose arena in Greeley, Colorado, United States. It was built in 1974 and is home to the University of Northern Colorado Bears men's and women's basketball teams, as well as the Bears volleyball, wrestling and indoor track and field programs.

Located on Northern Colorado's west campus, the Bank of Colorado Arena serves as "The Home of the Bears." Originally named for longtime UNC coaches Pete Butler and John W. Hancock, Butler-Hancock Hall opened its doors February 4, 1975. The venue was renamed the Butler–Hancock Sports Pavilion during the 2004–05 season. It hosted the finals of the 2011 Big Sky Conference men's basketball tournament.

The venue is undergoing renovations including a new seating structure involving chairback, permanent seating along the sides of the court as well as added seating behind each basket. There will be permanent chairback seating behind the east end basket and portable bleacher seating behind the west end goal.

On November 14, 2014, Northern Colorado announced a 15-year naming rights agreement with the Bank of Colorado to rename the arena the Bank of Colorado Arena.

== Attendance records ==
The following are the top ten crowds at Bank of Colorado Arena/Butler-Hancock Hall.

- 4,674 vs. Wisconsin-Milwaukee (3/18/89)
- 4,429 vs. Augustana (2/23/89)
- 4,013 vs. Alaska-Fairbanks (3/17/89)
- 3,875 vs. South Dakota State (2/25/89)
- 3,586 vs. Air Force (2/4/75)
- 3,311 vs. Denver (2/7/05)
- 3,198 vs. UIC (3/30/18)
- 3,192 vs. Colorado State (12/1/09)
- 3,104 vs. South Dakota (1/19/89)
- 3,013 vs. Denver (12/28/09)
- 2,932 vs. Metro State (12/5/86)

== UNC men's basketball year-by-year at Butler-Hancock ==
Year Record Pct.

- 1974-75 4-1 .800
- 1975-76 8-3 .727
- 1976-77 6-3 .667
- 1977-78 9-5 .643
- 1978-79 5-6 .455
- 1979-80 6-5 .545
- 1980-81 4-7 .364
- 1981-82 9-2 .818
- 1982-83 7-5 .583
- 1983-84 3-8 .273
- 1984-85 13-1 .929
- 1985-86 9-5 .643
- 1986-87 10-2 .833
- 1987-88 10-3 .769
- 1988-89 15-2 # .882
- 1989-90 7-6 .538
- 1990-91 2-10 .167
- 1991-92 12-4 .750
- 1992-93 8-5 .615
- 1993-94 6-7 .462
- 1994-95 7-6 .538
- 1995-96 5-7 .417
- 1996-97 5-8 .385
- 1997-98 10-3 .769
- 1998-99 6-6 .500
- 1999-00 5-7 .417
- 2000-01 7-5 .583
- 2001-02 9-3 .750
- 2002-03 5-6 .455
- 2003-04 4-5 .444
- 2004-05 7-4 .636
- 2005-06 5-9 .357
- 2006-07 3-9 .250
- 2007-08 9-4 .692
- 2008-09 9-4 .692
- 2009-10 13-2 .867
- 2010-11 14-0 1.000
- 2011-12 5-9 .357
- 2012-13 8-5 .615
- 2013-14 13-3 .813
- 2014-15 12-3 .800
- 2015-16 7-9 .438
- 2016-17 5-7 .417
- 2017-18 14-3 .824
- 2018-19 10-3 .769
- 2019-20 11-3 .786
- 2020-21 6-5 .545
- 2021-22 9-4 .692
- 2022-23 6-7 .462
- 2023-24 11-3 .786
- 2024-25 13-2 .867
- 2025-26 11-3 .786

Total 417-241 .634

== See also ==
- List of NCAA Division I basketball arenas
