= Viking Pavilion =

Sports arena on the Portland State University campus in Portland, Oregon, U.S.

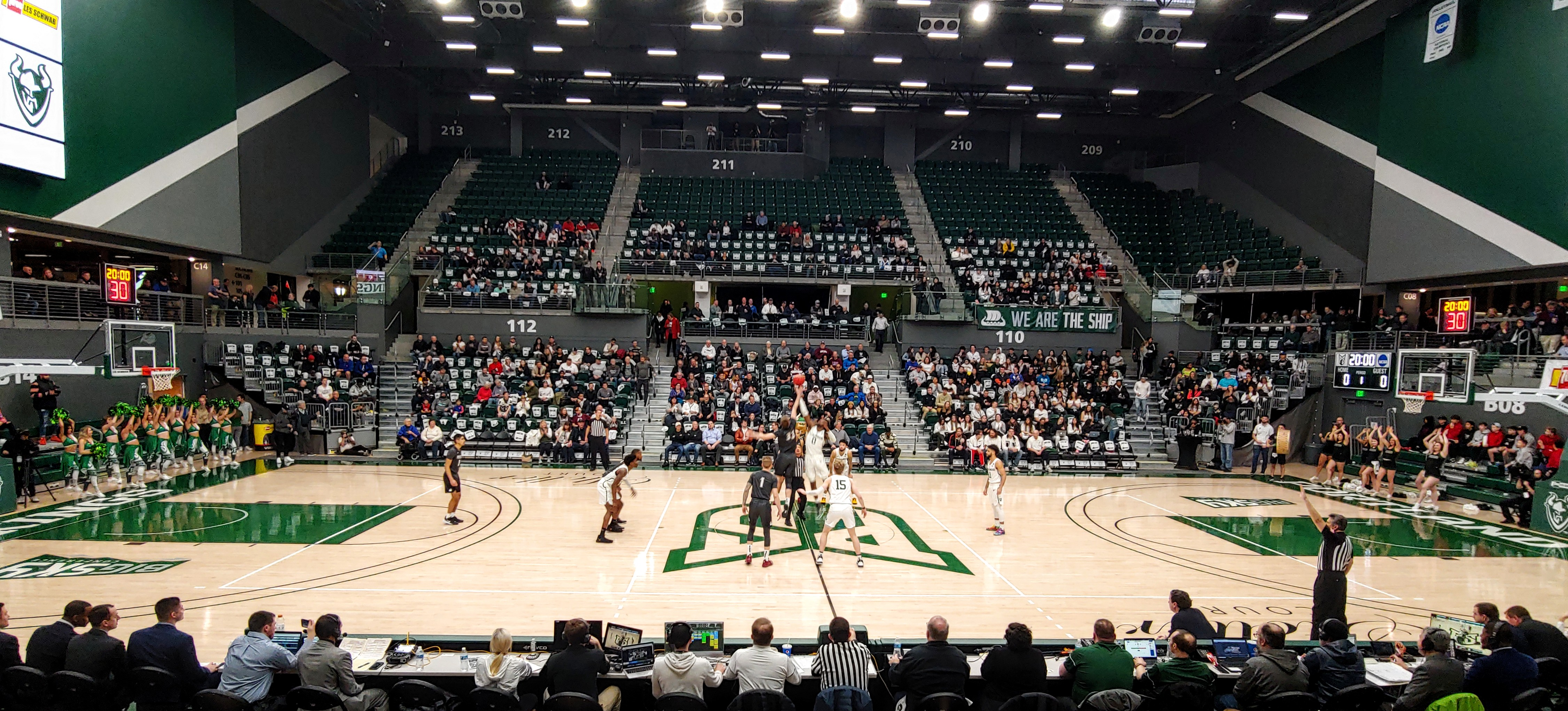
- Montana @ Portland State men's basketball, January 30, 2020.
- Interactive map of Viking Pavilion
- Location: 930 SW Hall; Portland, Oregon 97201
- Coordinates: 45.510987°N 122.687471°W
- Owner: Portland State University
- Operator: Portland State University
- Capacity: 3,094 seats (basketball, volleyball), 3,400 (Concerts, Other Events)
- Surface: Wood

Construction
- Opened: 1966
- Renovated: 1984, 2002, 2012, 2017–18

Viking Pavilion, attached to the Peter W. Stott Center, is a 3,094-seat multi-purpose arena located on the Portland State University campus in downtown Portland, Oregon. Viking Pavilion is home to the Portland State men's basketball, women's basketball, and volleyball teams. In addition to hosting sports events, the facility houses the Portland State Vikings Athletics Department and physical education classes. It features student locker rooms, a basketball/volleyball court, racquetball courts, an eighth-mile track, wrestling room, and a small gym. Viking Pavilion was fully renovated for 2018, but originally opened in 1966.

Prior to renovations, the facility was named for alumnus and booster Peter W. Stott, whose $1 million challenge grant enabled a prior renovation of the basketball court. The newest version of the arena began renovations on April 23, 2016. The renovation was complete in time for the 2018–2019 academic year at a cost of $52.1 million.

== See also ==
- List of sports venues in Portland, Oregon
- List of NCAA Division I basketball arenas
