= 2013–14 UC Santa Barbara Gauchos men's basketball team =

American college basketball season

2013–14 UC Santa Barbara Gauchos men's basketball
- Conference: Big West Conference
- Record: 21–9 (12–4 Big West)
- Head coach: Bob Williams (16th season)
- Assistant coaches: Matt Stock; Kevin Bromley; Ryan Madry
- Home arena: The Thunderdome

2013–14 Big West men's basketball standings
	Conf.				Overall
Team	W		L	PCT	W		L	PCT
UC Irvine	13	–	3	.813	23	–	12	.657
UC Santa Barbara	12	–	4	.750	21	–	9	.700
Long Beach State	10	–	6	.625	15	–	17	.469
Hawai'i	9	–	7	.563	20	–	11	.645
Cal State Northridge	7	–	9	.438	17	–	18	.486
Cal Poly †	6	–	10	.375	14	–	20	.412
Cal State Fullerton	6	–	10	.375	11	–	20	.355
UC Riverside	5	–	11	.313	10	–	21	.323
UC Davis	4	–	12	.250	9	–	22	.290
† 2014 Big West tournament winner

The 2013–14 UC Santa Barbara Gauchos men's basketball team represented the University of California, Santa Barbara during the 2013–14 NCAA Division I men's basketball season. The Gauchos, led by 16th year head coach Bob Williams, played their home games at the UC Santa Barbara Events Center, nicknamed The Thunderdome, as members of the Big West Conference. They finished the season 21–9, 12–4 in Big West play to finish in second place. They lost in the quarterfinals of the Big West Conference tournament to Cal Poly. Despite having 21 wins, they did not participate in a post season tournament.

== Season ==
=== Preseason ===
The UC Santa Barbara schedule was announced in August 2013. Key games included road matches at UNLV, Colorado, and UCLA, as well as a trip to the Utah State Tournament, hosted by Utah State University. UCSB also scheduled to play host to teams such as South Dakota State, Utah State, and California. The Gauchos' conference slate included one home game and one away game against each of the eight other members of the Big West Conference.

== Roster ==
2013–14 UC Santa Barbara Gauchos men's basketball team
Players
Coaches

Pos.	#	Name	Height	Weight	Year	Previous school	Hometown
G	0	Hunter Ford (W)	6 ft 3 in (1.91 m)	180 lb (82 kg)	RS Fr	Oakmont HS	Roseville, CA
G	1	Eric Childress	6 ft 0 in (1.83 m)	175 lb (79 kg)	Fr	Leuzinger HS	Hawthorne, CA
G	2	Logan Louks	6 ft 2 in (1.88 m)	175 lb (79 kg)	So	San Ramon Valley HS; Santa Barbara City College	Danville, CA
G	3	Zalmico Harmon	6 ft 0 in (1.83 m)	185 lb (84 kg)	Jr	Ballou HS; Ventura CC	Washington, D.C.
G	4	Aamahd Walker	6 ft 2 in (1.88 m)	190 lb (86 kg)	RS Fr	Culver City HS	Culver City, CA
G	10	Kyle Boswell	6 ft 2 in (1.88 m)	180 lb (82 kg)	Sr	Edison HS	Huntington Beach, CA
G	11	T. J. Taylor	5 ft 9 in (1.75 m)	160 lb (73 kg)	Jr	Oakland HS	Oakland, CA
F	12	Alex Hart	6 ft 10 in (2.08 m)	215 lb (98 kg)	Fr	Immaculata HS	Kelowna, B.C.
C	15	Alan Williams	6 ft 7 in (2.01 m)	240 lb (109 kg)	Jr	North HS	Phoenix, AZ
F	21	Mitch Brewe	6 ft 8 in (2.03 m)	242 lb (110 kg)	So	Seattle Preparatory School	Seattle, WA
G	24	Michael Bryson	6 ft 4 in (1.93 m)	201 lb (91 kg)	So	Foothill HS	Sacramento, CA
G/F	31	John Green	6 ft 5 in (1.96 m)	180 lb (82 kg)	RS So	Westwind Preparatory Academy	Oakland, CA
F	32	Drew Dickey (W)	6 ft 8 in (2.03 m)	225 lb (102 kg)	RS Fr	Saint Francis HS	Palo Alto, CA
G/F	34	Shawn Moore (W)	6 ft 5 in (1.96 m)	210 lb (95 kg)	Sr	Pleasant Valley HS; Butte College	Chico, CA
F	35	Taran Brown	6 ft 8 in (2.03 m)	190 lb (86 kg)	So	Campbell County HS	Gillette, WY
G	43	Duke DaRe (W)	6 ft 1 in (1.85 m)	185 lb (84 kg)	So	De La Salle HS	Clayton, CA
F	44	Sam Beeler	6 ft 10 in (2.08 m)	210 lb (95 kg)	So	Poway HS	Poway, CA

Head coach

- Bob Williams (San José State)

Assistant coach(es)

- Matt Stock (UC Santa Barbara)
- Kevin Bromley (Colorado State)
- Ryan Madry (West Georgia)

Legend

- (C) Team captain
- (S) Suspended
- (I) Ineligible
- (W) Walk-on
- Injured
- Current redshirt

== Schedule and results ==
Date time, TV	Opponent	Result	Record	Site (attendance) city, state
Exhibition
11/3/2013*; 4:00 pm	Cal State East Bay	W 88–65	–	The Thunderdome (1,317); Santa Barbara, CA
Non-conference games
11/8/2013*; 7:00 pm	Hawaiʻi Pacific	W 76–50	1–0	The Thunderdome (1,757); Santa Barbara, CA
11/12/2013*; 7:00 pm	at UNLV	W 86–65	2–0	Thomas & Mack Center (12,242); Las Vegas, NV
11/16/2013*; 4:00 pm	Utah State	L 64–71	2–1	The Thunderdome (2,817); Santa Barbara, CA
11/21/2013*; 5:00 pm, P12N	at Colorado	L 68–76	2–2	Coors Events Center (8,488); Boulder, CO
11/29/2013*; 7:00 pm	South Dakota State	W 83–64	3–2	The Thunderdome (1,857); Santa Barbara, CA
12/3/2013*; 8:00 pm, P12N	at No. 18 UCLA	L 76–89	3–3	Pauley Pavilion (6,644); Los Angeles, CA
12/6/2013*; 7:00 pm	California	W 72–65	4–3	The Thunderdome (4,017); Santa Barbara, CA
12/15/2013*; 2:00 pm	at San Diego	W 72–61	5–3	Jenny Craig Pavilion (1,609); San Diego, CA
12/19/2013*; 4:30 pm	vs. Troy; Utah State Tournament	W 57–54	6–3	Smith Spectrum (N/A); Logan, UT
12/20/2013*; 7:05 pm	at Utah State; Utah State Tournament	L 71–77 ^{OT}	6–4	Smith Spectrum (9,809); Logan, UT
12/21/2013*; 4:30 pm	vs. Western Illinois; Utah State Tournament	W 61–55	7–4	Smith Spectrum (1,915); Logan, UT
12/30/2013*; 7:00 pm	at Seattle	W 86–70	8–4	KeyArena (2,092); Seattle, WA
01/04/2014*; 4:00 pm	The Master's	W 81–52	9–4	The Thunderdome (1,120); Santa Barbara, CA
Conference games
01/11/2014; 4:00 pm	Cal Poly	L 64–72	9–5 (0–1)	The Thunderdome (5,982); Santa Barbara, CA
1/16/2014; 7:00 pm	Long Beach State	W 64–51	10–5 (1–1)	The Thunderdome (3,556); Santa Barbara, CA
1/18/2014; 7:00 pm, Prime Ticket	at Cal State Northridge	W 79–69	11–5 (2–1)	Matadome (1,301); Northridge, CA
1/23/2014; 7:00 pm	at UC Riverside	W 68–65 ^{OT}	12–5 (3–1)	UC Riverside Student Recreation Center (1,236); Riverside, CA
1/25/2014; 7:00 pm, Prime Ticket	at Cal State Fullerton	L 72–74	12–6 (3–2)	Titan Gym (1,772); Fullerton, CA
1/30/2014; 7:00 pm	UC Irvine	W 80–60	13–6 (4–2)	The Thunderdome (3,013); Santa Barbara, CA
2/1/2014; 4:00 pm	UC Davis	W 82–67	14–6 (5–2)	The Thunderdome (2,509); Santa Barbara, CA
2/7/2014; 9:00 pm, OC Sports	at Hawaiʻi	W 75–64	15–6 (6–2)	Stan Sheriff Center (5,773); Honolulu, HI
2/13/2014; 7:00 pm, ESPN3	at Long Beach State	W 65–64	16–6 (7–2)	Walter Pyramid (3,269); Long Beach, CA
2/15/2014; 4:00 pm	Cal State Northridge	L 78–80 ^{OT}	16–7 (7–3)	The Thunderdome (2,687); Santa Barbara, CA
2/20/2014; 7:00 pm	UC Riverside	W 55–54	17–7 (8–3)	The Thunderdome (2,417); Santa Barbara, CA
2/22/2014; 4:00 pm	Cal State Fullerton	W 80–65	18–7 (9–3)	The Thunderdome (2,737); Santa Barbara, CA
2/27/2014; 7:00 pm	at UC Irvine	L 60–71	18–8 (9–4)	Bren Events Center (2,680); Irvine, CA
3/1/2014; 7:00 pm, ESPN2	at UC Davis	W 67–54	19–8 (10–4)	The Pavilion (5,227); Davis, CA
3/6/2014; 7:00 pm	Hawaiʻi	W 86–77	20–8 (11–4)	The Thunderdome (4,019); Santa Barbara, CA
3/8/2014; 7:00 pm	at Cal Poly	W 71–55	21–8 (12–4)	Mott Gym (3,202); San Luis Obispo, CA
Big West tournament
3/13/2014; 12:00 pm	vs. Cal Poly; Quarterfinals	L 38–69	21–9	Honda Center (N/A); Anaheim, CA
*Non-conference game. ^{#}Rankings from AP Poll. (#) Tournament seedings in parentheses. All times are in Pacific Time.
