= 2013–14 Pepperdine Waves men's basketball team =

American college basketball season

2013–14 Pepperdine Waves men's basketball
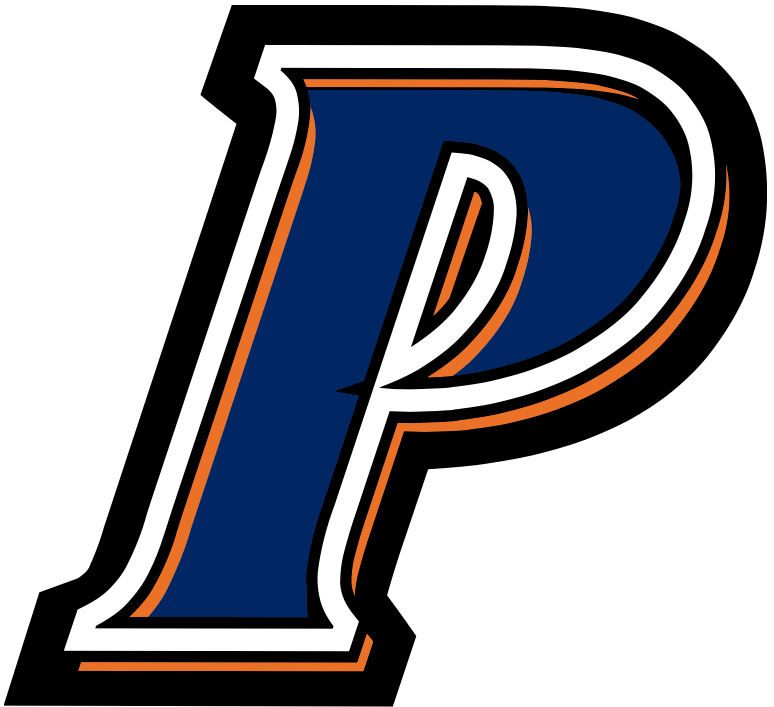
- Conference: West Coast Conference
- Record: 15–16 (8–10 WCC)
- Head coach: Marty Wilson (3rd season)
- Assistant coaches: Mark Amaral; Bryant Moore; John Impelman
- Home arena: Firestone Fieldhouse

2013–14 West Coast Conference men's basketball standings
	Conf.				Overall
Team	W		L	PCT	W		L	PCT
Gonzaga †	15	–	3	.833	29	–	7	.806
BYU	13	–	5	.722	23	–	12	.657
San Francisco	13	–	5	.722	21	–	12	.636
Saint Mary's	11	–	7	.611	23	–	12	.657
Pepperdine	8	–	10	.444	15	–	16	.484
San Diego	7	–	11	.389	18	–	17	.514
Portland	7	–	11	.389	15	–	16	.484
Pacific	6	–	12	.333	18	–	16	.529
Santa Clara	6	–	12	.333	14	–	19	.424
Loyola Marymount	4	–	14	.222	13	–	19	.406
† Conference tournament winner

The 2013–14 Pepperdine Waves men's basketball team represented Pepperdine University during the 2013–14 NCAA Division I men's basketball season. This was head coach Marty Wilson's third full season at Pepperdine. The Waves played their home games at the Firestone Fieldhouse and are members of the West Coast Conference. They finished the season 15–16, 8–10 in WCC play to finish in fifth place. They lost in the quarterfinals of the WCC tournament to Saint Mary's.

== Before the season ==
=== Departures ===
Name	Number	Pos.	Height	Weight	Year	Hometown	Notes
Jordan Baker	1	G	6'3"	180	Sophomore	Tempe, Arizona	Left the Program
Dominic Redix	2	G	6'0"	185	Junior	Apple Valley, California	Walk-on didn't return
Lorne Jackson	20	G	6'2"	205	RS Senior	Simi Valley, California	Graduated
Caleb Willis	23	G	6'2"	220	Senior	Stockbridge, Georgia	Graduated
Manny Ochenje	34	F	6'4"	205	Sophomore	San Luis Obispo, California	Transferred
Moriba De Freitas	50	G	6'9"	220	RS Junior	Bon Air Gardens, Trinidad	Left the Program
Jan Maehlen	55	C	7'0"	315	RS Sophomore	Tucson, Arizona	Transferred
Jason Hart	XX	G	6'3"	180	Assistant Coach	Inglewood, California	Became a new assistant at USC

=== Recruits ===
College recruiting information (2013)
Name	Hometown	School	Height	Weight	Commit date
David Jesperson; F	Merrill, Wisconsin	Merrill	6 ft 9 in (2.06 m)	220 lb (100 kg)	May 18, 2013
David Jesperson; F	Recruit ratings: Scout: Rivals: (66)				
Jeremy Major; G	Pasadena, California	Maranatha	5 ft 10 in (1.78 m)	160 lb (73 kg)	Jan 24, 2012
Jeremy Major; G	Recruit ratings: Scout: Rivals: (69)				
Lamond Murray Jr. G/F	Torrance, California	Bishop Montgomery	6 ft 5 in (1.96 m)	200 lb (91 kg)	Sep 26, 2012
Lamond Murray Jr. G/F	Recruit ratings: Scout: Rivals: (69)				
Jeff Van Dyke; G	Encinitas, California	La Costa Canyon	6 ft 3 in (1.91 m)	170 lb (77 kg)	Sep 26, 2012
Jeff Van Dyke; G	Recruit ratings: Scout: Rivals: (59)				
Malcolm Brooks; G	Brooklyn, New York	Benjamin Cardozo; Lamar CC	6 ft 5 in (1.96 m)	180 lb (82 kg)	Apr 30, 2013
Malcolm Brooks; G	Recruit ratings: Scout: Rivals: (JC)				
Marley Biyendolo; G	Dingley Village, Victoria	Cheltenham Secondary College; Andrew Bogut Academy	6 ft 3 in (1.91 m)	176 lb (80 kg)	Jul 9, 2013
Marley Biyendolo; G	Recruit ratings: Scout: Rivals:				
Overall recruit ranking: Scout: nr Rivals: nr ESPN: nr
Note: In many cases, Scout, Rivals, 247Sports, On3, and ESPN may conflict in their listings of height and weight.; In these cases, the average was taken. ESPN grades are on a 100-point scale.; Sources: "Pepperdine Waves 2013 Basketball Commitments". Rivals.; "2013 Pepperdine Waves Basketball Commits". Scout.; "ESPN 2013 Pepperdine Waves Basketball recruits". ESPN.; "Scout.com Team Recruiting Rankings". Scout.; "2013 Team Ranking". Rivals.

== Roster ==
2013–14 Pepperdine Waves men's basketball team
Players
Coaches

Pos.	#	Name	Height	Weight	Year	Previous school	Hometown
G	1	Marley Biyendolo	6 ft 3 in (1.91 m)	180 lb (82 kg)	Fr	Cheltenham Secondary College; Andrew Bogut Academy	Dingley Village, Victoria, Australia
G	2	Allen Stevens	5 ft 10 in (1.78 m)	150 lb (68 kg)	Jr	Oaks Christian	Moorpark, CA
G	3	Jeremy Major	5 ft 10 in (1.78 m)	165 lb (75 kg)	Fr	Maranatha	Pasadena, CA
F	5	Stacy Davis	6 ft 6 in (1.98 m)	240 lb (109 kg)	So	Laveen Betty Fairfax	Laveen, AZ
G	10	Jeff Van Dyke	6 ft 2 in (1.88 m)	180 lb (82 kg)	Fr	La Costa Canyon	Carlsbad, CA
G	11	Atif Russell	6 ft 4 in (1.93 m)	200 lb (91 kg)	So	Seven Lakes	Katy, TX
F	12	David Jesperson	6 ft 8 in (2.03 m)	210 lb (95 kg)	Fr	Merrill	Merrill, WI
G	13	Austin Mills	6 ft 0 in (1.83 m)	170 lb (77 kg)	So	Beverly Hills	Beverly Hills, CA
G	15	Malcolm Brooks	6 ft 4 in (1.93 m)	190 lb (86 kg)	Jr	Cardozo; Lamar CC	Brooklyn, NY
G	21	Brendan Lane	6 ft 9 in (2.06 m)	223 lb (101 kg)	RS Sr	UCLA	Rocklin, CA
G/F	30	Lamond Murray Jr.	6 ft 5 in (1.96 m)	200 lb (91 kg)	Fr	Bishop Montgomery	Torrance, CA
G	31	Nikolas Skouen	6 ft 4 in (1.93 m)	190 lb (86 kg)	Sr	Pratt CC	Bergen, Norway
F	44	Malte Kramer	6 ft 6 in (1.98 m)	215 lb (98 kg)	Sr	Cuesta College	San Luis Obispo, CA
F	45	Jett Raines	6 ft 7 in (2.01 m)	195 lb (88 kg)	So	Coppell	Coppell, TX

Head coach

- Marty Wilson (Pepperdine)

Assistant coach(es)

- Marak Amaral (College of Idaho)
- Bryant Moore (Texas Tech)
- John Impelman (Occidental)

Legend

- (C) Team captain
- (S) Suspended
- (I) Ineligible
- (W) Walk-on
- Injured
- Current redshirt

== Schedule and results ==
All non-conference home games, and conference home games not picked up by the WCC regional packages, are shown on TV-32 in Malibu, known as Pepperdine TV. They are also shown on pepperdinesports.com at no cost for all fans to enjoy.

Date time, TV	Opponent	Result	Record	Site city, state
Regular Season
11/09/2013*; 5:00 pm, TV-32	San Diego Christian	W 81–68	1–0	Firestone Fieldhouse; Malibu, CA
11/13/2013*; 7:00 pm, BigWest.tv	at UC Riverside	W 69–66	2–0	UC Riverside Student Recreation Center; Riverside, CA
11/16/2013*; 3:30 pm	at Central Michigan	W 86–71	3–0	McGuirk Arena; Mt. Pleasant, MI
11/20/2013*; 7:00 pm, TV-32	San Jose State	L 77–83	3–1	Firestone Fieldhouse; Malibu, CA
11/23/2013*; 5:00 pm, TV-32	Utah Valley	W 58–53	4–1	Firestone Fieldhouse; Malibu, CA
11/28/2013*; 6:30 pm, CBSSN	vs. Green Bay; Great Alaska Shootout First Round	L 89–97	4–2	Sullivan Arena; Anchorage, AK
11/29/2013*; 3:00 pm	vs. Denver; Great Alaska Shootout Consolation 2nd Round	W 68–56	5–2	Sullivan Arena; Anchorage, AK
11/30/2013*; 3:00 pm	vs. Indiana State; Great Alaska Shootout 5th Place Game	L 70–73	5–3	Sullivan Arena; Anchorage, AK
12/04/2013*; 7:00 pm, TV-32	Cal State Fullerton	L 64–78	5–4	Firestone Fieldhouse; Malibu, CA
12/07/2013*; 7:00 pm, BigWest.tv	at UC Irvine	W 75–69	6–4	Bren Events Center; Irvine, CA
12/15/2013*; 5:00 pm, P12N	at Washington State	L 61–78	6–5	Beasley Coliseum; Pullman, WA
12/21/2013*; 1:00 pm, TV-32	Houston Baptist	W 76–64	7–5	Firestone Fieldhouse; Malibu, CA
12/28/2013; 5:00 pm, TV-32	San Diego	W 75–64	8–5 (1–0)	Firestone Fieldhouse; Malibu, CA
12/30/2014; 7:00 pm, TWCSN	BYU	W 80–74	9–5 (2–0)	Firestone Fieldhouse; Malibu, CA
01/02/2014; 7:00 pm, TheW.tv	at Santa Clara	W 70–61	10–5 (3–0)	Leavey Center; Santa Clara, CA
01/04/2014; 1:00 pm, TWCSN	at San Francisco	L 66–76	10–6 (3–1)	War Memorial Gymnasium; San Francisco, CA
01/09/2014; 6:00 pm, BYUtv	at BYU	L 72–84	10–7 (3–2)	Marriott Center; Provo, UT
01/11/2014; 6:00 pm, FSSD	at San Diego	W 69–65	11–7 (4–2)	Jenny Craig Pavilion; San Diego, CA
01/16/2014; 7:00 pm, TWCSN	Gonzaga	L 53–70	11–8 (4–3)	Firestone Fieldhouse; Malibu, CA
01/18/2014; 5:00 pm, TV-32	Portland	W 76–65	12–8 (5–3)	Firestone Fieldhouse; Malibu, CA
01/23/2014; 7:00 pm, TheW.tv	at Saint Mary's	L 74–80	12–9 (5–4)	McKeon Pavilion; Moraga, CA
01/25/2014; 7:00 pm, TheW.tv	at Pacific	L 66–76	12–10 (5–5)	Alex G. Spanos Center; Stockton, CA
02/01/2014; 3:00 pm, TWCSN	Loyola Marymount	W 80–69	13–10 (6–5)	Firestone Fieldhouse; Malibu, CA
02/06/2014; 7:00 pm, TheW.tv	Pacific	W 80–69	14–10 (7–5)	Firestone Fieldhouse; Malibu, CA
02/08/2014; 1:00 pm, TWCSN	Saint Mary's	L 67–69 ^{OT}	14–11 (7–6)	Firestone Fieldhouse; Malibu, CA
02/13/2014; 6:00 pm, TWCSN	at Gonzaga	L 68–83	14–12 (7–7)	McCarthey Athletic Center; Spokane, WA
02/15/2014; 1:00 pm, TWCSN	at Portland	L 62–74	14–13 (7–8)	Chiles Center; Portland, OR
02/20/2014; 8:00 pm, ESPNU	at Loyola Marymount	W 72–69	15–13 (8–8)	Gersten Pavilion; Los Angeles, CA
02/27/2014; 7:00 pm, TheW.tv	San Francisco	L 53-77	15–14 (8–9)	Firestone Fieldhouse; Malibu, CA
03/01/2014; 5:00 pm, TheW.tv	Santa Clara	L 78–86	15–15 (8–10)	Firestone Fieldhouse; Malibu, CA
2014 West Coast Conference men's basketball tournament
03/08/2014; 8:30 pm, ESPN2	vs. Saint Mary's; Quarterfinals	L 69–80	15–16	Orleans Arena; Paradise, NV
*Non-conference game. ^{#}Rankings from AP Poll. (#) Tournament seedings in parentheses. All times are in Pacific Time.

== Game summaries ==
=== San Diego Christian ===
Series History: First Meeting
Broadcaster: Al Epstein

TV-32

Nov 9
5:05 pm PST

Hawks 68, Waves 81
Scoring by half: 35-35yes or no, 33-46
Pts: Andy Saharan 22; Rebs: Josh Richardson 9 Asts: Kwaminique Brandon 10	Pts: Stacy Davis 24; Rebs: Brendan Lane 14; Asts: Amadi Udenyi, Jeremy Major, & Malcolm Brooks 4

Firestone Fieldhouse
Malibu, CA
Attendance: 937
Referees: Michael Reed, Frank Harvey, Tim Marion

=== UC Riverside ===
Series History: Pepperdine leads 4-1

Nov 13
7:00 PM PST

Recap

Waves 69, Highlanders 66
Scoring by half: 40-32, 29-34
Pts: Stacy Davis 23; Rebs: Stacy Davis & Brendan Lane 9 Asts: Jeremy Major 4	Pts: Chris Harriel 15; Rebs: Taylor Johns, Steven Thornton, & Chris Patton 4 Asts: Nick Gruninger 4

UC Riverside Student Recreation Center
Riverside, CA
Attendance: N/A
Referees: Michael Scyphers, Bill Vinovich, Michael Greenstein

=== Central Michigan ===
Series History: Central Michigan leads 2-0

Nov 16
6:30 PM EST

Recap

Waves 88, Chippewas 71
Scoring by half: 38-41, 50-30
Pts: Stacy Davis 24; Rebs: Brendan Lane 10; Asts: Jeremy Majors & Austin Mills 6	Pts: Chris Fowler 23; Rebs: Austin Stewart 7 Asts: Chris Fowler 4

McGuirk Arena
Mt. Pleasant, MI
Attendance: 1,593
Referees: Dan Dorian, Ray Perone, Paul Szelc

=== San Jose State ===
Series History: San Jose State leads series 24-21
Broadcaster: Al Epstein

TV-32

Nov 20
7:05 PM PST

Recap

Spartans 83, Waves 77
Scoring by half: 34-44, 49-33
Pts: Jaleel Williams 22; Rebs: Chris Cunningham 11; Asts: Jalen James 4	Pts: Brendan Lane 23; Rebs: Stacy Davis & Brendan Lane 9 Asts: Jeremy Major 9

Firestone Fieldhouse
Malibu, CA
Attendance: 847
Referees: Michael Scyphers, Rob Rorke, Tim Marion

=== Utah Valley ===
Series History: Utah Valley leads 1-0
Broadcaster: Al Epstein

TV-32

Nov 23
5:05 PM PST

Recap

Wolverines 53, Waves 58
Scoring by half: 24-22, 29-36
Pts: Zach Nelson 13; Rebs: Ben Aird 8 Asts: Zach Nelson 5	Pts: Brendan Lane 11; Rebs: Brendan Lane 10; Asts: Stacey Davis & Malte Kramer 2

Firestone Fieldhouse
Malibu, CA
Attendance: 614
Referees: Tony Padilla, Glen Mayberry, Deron White

=== Great Alaska Shootout: Green Bay ===
Series History: Green Bay leads series 1-0
Broadcasters: Brent Stover, Pete Gillen, & Rontina McCann

CBSSN

Nov 28
5:30 PM AKST

Recap

Waves 89, Phoenix 97
Scoring by half: 38-39, 51-58
Pts: Brendan Lane 26; Rebs: Brendan Lane 13; Asts: Jeremy Major 12	Pts: Keifer Sykes 23; Rebs: Alec Brown 8 Asts: Keifer Stykes 6

Sullivan Arena
Anchorage, AK
Attendance: 3,815
Referees: Mike Thomson, Bill McNew, Wilson Holland

=== Great Alaska Shootout: Denver ===
Series History: First Meeting

Nov 29
2:00 PM AKST

Recap

Pioneers 56, Waves 68
Scoring by half: 38-30, 15-41
Pts: Jalen Love 20; Rebs: Cam Griffin 9 Asts: Brett Olson 4	Pts: Stacy Davis 22; Rebs: Brendan Lane 5 Asts: Jeremy Major 7

Sullivan Arena
Anchorage, AK
Attendance: 3,926
Referees: Gabby Lujan, Bill McNew, Levon Zakarian

=== Great Alaska Shootout: Indiana State ===
Series History: Indiana State leads 3-1

Nov 30
2:00 PM AKST

Recap

Sycamores 73, Waves 70
Scoring by half: 33-35, 40-35
Pts: Justin Gant 18; Rebs: Justin Gant 4 Asts: Justin Gant 4	Pts: Jeremy Major 15; Rebs: Brendan Lane 6 Asts: Jeremy Major 6

Sullivan Arena
Anchorage, AK
Attendance: 3,898
Referees: Bruce Corson, Rick Paz, Dennis Flannery

=== Cal State Fullerton ===
Series History: Pepperdine leads 11-10
Broadcaster: Al Epstein

TV-32

Dec 4
7:05 PM PST

Recap

Titans 78, Waves 64
Scoring by half: 32-36, 46-27
Pts: Marquis Horne 21; Rebs: Alex Harris 8 Asts: Michael Harris 6	Pts: Brendan Lane 24; Rebs: Stacy Davis 8 Asts: Malcolm Brooks 5

Firestone Fieldhouse
Malibu, CA
Attendance: 592
Referees: Michael Reed, Frank Harvey, Tony Padilla

=== UC Irvine ===
Series History: Pepperdine leads 11-10
Broadcaster:

Dec 7
7:00 PM PST

Recap

Waves 75, Anteaters 69
Scoring by half: 30-40, 45-29
Pts: Stacy Davis & Jeremy Major 18; Rebs: Stacy Davis 10; Asts: Stacy Davis & Brendan Lane 3	Pts: Chris McNealy 16; Rebs: Will Davis II 8 Asts: Alex Young 8

Bren Events Center
Irvine, CA
Attendance: 2,283
Referees: Deron White, James Giron, Martin Cota

=== Washington State ===
Series History: Series tied 3-3
Broadcasters: Rich Waltz and Ernie Kent

P12N

Dec 15
5:00 PM PST

Recap

Waves 61, Cougars 78
Scoring by half: 26-41, 35-37
Pts: Jeremy Major 17; Rebs: Brendan Lane 8 Asts: Stacy Davis & Malcolm Brooks 3	Pts: Royce Woolridge 20; Rebs: Davonte Lacy 8 Asts: Royce Woolridge 4

Beasley Coliseum
Pullman, WA
Attendance: 2,243
Referees: Randy McCall, Kelly Self, Gerry Pollard

=== Houston Baptist ===
Series History: Pepperdine leads 1-0
Broadcaster: Al Epstein

TV-32

Dec 21
1:05 PM PST

Recap

Huskies 64, Waves 76
Scoring by half: 34-31, 30-45
Pts: Rob Lewis 14; Rebs: Dauson Womack 10; Asts: Marcel Smith 6	Pts: Stacy Davis & Brendan Lane 21; Rebs: Brendan Lane 11; Asts: Malcolm Brooks 5

Firestone Fieldhouse
Malibu, CA
Attendance: 810
Referees: Klaus Endrissat, LaDonte King, Tom Nally

=== San Diego ===
Series History: Pepperdine leads 56-40
Broadcaster: Al Epstein

TV-32

Dec 28
5:05 PM PST

Recap

Toreros 64, Waves 75
Scoring by half: 26-34, 38-41
Pts: Johnny Dee 26; Rebs: Dennis Kramer 8 Asts: Christopher Anderson 5	Pts: Malcolm Brooks 20; Rebs: Stacy Davis 10; Asts: Amadi Udenyi & Stacy Davis 5

Firestone Fieldhouse
Malibu, CA
Attendance: 1,037
Referees: Michael Reed, Horace Shields, Tom Spitznagel

=== BYU ===
Broadcasters: Ari Wolfe, Jarron Collins, and Kelli Tennant
Series History: BYU leads 8-4

TWCSN

Dec 30
7:04 PM PST

Recap

Cougars 74, Waves 80
Scoring by half: 28-40, 46-40
Pts: Tyler Haws 20; Rebs: Kyle Collinsworth 13; Asts: Kyle Collinsworth 7	Pts: Malcolm Brooks 24; Rebs: Stacy Davis 14; Asts: Amadi Udenyi 5

Firestone Fieldhouse
Malibu, CA
Attendance: 2,317
Referees: Ken Ditty, Michael Schyphers, Deron White

=== Santa Clara ===
Broadcaster: Rich Cellini, John Stege, and Amanda Blackwell
Series History: Santa Clara leads 76-50

TheW.tv

Jan 2
5:05 PM PST

Recap

Waves 70, Broncos 61
Scoring by half: 38-33, 32-28
Pts: Brendan Lane 26; Rebs: Brendan Lane 17; Asts: Jeremy Major 7	Pts: Jared Brownridge 18; Rebs: Jerry Brown 8 Asts: Jared Brownridge 6

Leavey Center
Santa Clara, CA
Attendance: 1,431
Referees: Tony Padilla, James Giron, Kurt Walker

=== San Francisco ===
Broadcasters: Barry Tompkins and Jarron Collins
Series History: San Francisco leads 71-50

TWCSN

Jan 4
1:00 PM PST

Recap

Waves 66, Dons 76
Scoring by half: 27-19, 39-57
Pts: Brendan Lane 13; Rebs: Stacy Davis 13; Asts: Amadi Udenyi 2	Pts: Kruize Pinkins 19; Rebs: Kruize Pinkins 11; Asts: Matt Glover 6

War Memorial Gymnasium
San Francisco, CA
Attendance: 1,451
Referees: Brett Nansel, Daryl Gelinas, Bob Rorke

=== BYU ===
Broadcasters: Dave McCann, Blaine Fowler, and Spencer Linton
Series History: BYU leads 8-5

BYUtv

Jan 9
7:05 PM MST

Recap

Waves 72, Cougars 84
Scoring by half: 30-33, 42-51
Pts: Stacy Davis 17; Rebs: Lamond Murray Jr. 6 Asts: Jeremy Major 6	Pts: Tyler Haws 35; Rebs: Kyle Collinsworth 10; Asts: Kyle Collinsworth 9

Marriott Center
Provo, UT
Attendance: 14,012
Referees: Richard Batsell, Nate Harris, Casey McClellan

=== San Diego ===
Broadcasters: Eddie Doucette, Brad Holland, and Laura McKeeman
Series History: Pepperdine leads 57-40

FSSD

Jan 11
6:00 PM PST

Recap

Waves 69, Toreros 65
Scoring by half: 36-30, 33-35
Pts: Stacy Davis 28; Rebs: Stacy Davis 10; Asts: Jeremy Major 5	Pts: Dennis Kramer 17; Rebs: Duda Sanadze & Dennis Kramer 4 Asts: Christopher Anderson 5

Jenny Craig Pavilion
San Diego, CA
Attendance: 2,587
Referees: Bruce Hicks, Donald McAllister, LaDonte King

== Rankings ==
Regular season polls
Poll	Pre- Season	Week 1	Week 2	Week 3	Week 4	Week 5	Week 6	Week 7	Week 8	Week 9	Week 10	Week 11	Week 12	Week 13	Week 14	Week 15	Week 16	Week 17	Week 18 Postseason	Final
AP																				
Coaches																				

Legend
	Increase in ranking
	Decrease in ranking
	No Change
(RV)	Received Votes
(NV)	No Votes
