= 2013–14 Cal Poly Mustangs men's basketball team =

American college basketball season

2013–14 Cal Poly Mustangs men's basketball

Big West tournament champions

NCAA tournament, round of 64
- Conference: Big West Conference
- Record: 14–20 (6–10 Big West)
- Head coach: Joe Callero (5th season)
- Assistant coaches: Paul Fortier; Sam Kirby; Mitch Reaves
- Home arena: Mott Gym

2013–14 Big West men's basketball standings
	Conf.				Overall
Team	W		L	PCT	W		L	PCT
UC Irvine	13	–	3	.813	23	–	12	.657
UC Santa Barbara	12	–	4	.750	21	–	9	.700
Long Beach State	10	–	6	.625	15	–	17	.469
Hawai'i	9	–	7	.563	20	–	11	.645
Cal State Northridge	7	–	9	.438	17	–	18	.486
Cal Poly †	6	–	10	.375	14	–	20	.412
Cal State Fullerton	6	–	10	.375	11	–	20	.355
UC Riverside	5	–	11	.313	10	–	21	.323
UC Davis	4	–	12	.250	9	–	22	.290
† 2014 Big West tournament winner

The 2013–14 Cal Poly Mustangs men's basketball team represented California Polytechnic State University during the 2013–14 NCAA Division I men's basketball season. The Mustangs were led by fifth year head coach Joe Callero and played their home games at Mott Gym. They were members of the Big West Conference.

Cal Poly finished the regular season with a 10–19 record (6–10 Big West) and entered the Big West Conference tournament as the 7 seed. The Mustangs won the tournament to earn an automatic bid to their first NCAA tournament appearance in school history. After beating Texas Southern, they lost to Wichita State, 64–37, and finished 14–20.

== Roster ==
Number	Name	Position	Height	Weight	Year	Hometown
0	David Nwaba	Guard	6–4	200	Sophomore	Los Angeles, California
1	Markel Leonard	Guard	6–0	168	Freshman	Richmond, California
2	Andy Rowley	Guard	6–0	163	Senior	San Luis Obispo, California
3	Maliik Love	Guard	6–2	209	Junior	Oceanside, California
4	Alberto Ganis	Forward	6–5	211	Junior	Tavagnacco, Italy
5	Reese Morgan	Guard	6–2	206	Sophomore	San Pedro, California
10	Ridge Shipley	Guard	6–0	184	Freshman	Carrollton, Texas
11	Taylor Sutlive	Guard	6–3	193	Freshman	San Antonio, Texas
14	Max Betkowski	Guard	6–3	224	Freshman	San Francisco, California
24	Jamal Johnson	Guard	6–0	177	Senior	San Antonio, Texas
25	Joel Awich	Forward	6–7	209	Sophomore	St. Paul, Minnesota
30	Michael Bolden	Guard	6–5	192	Junior	Mission Viejo, California
33	Chris Eversley	Forward	6–7	229	Senior	Chicago, Illinois
34	Brian Bennett	Forward	6–9	253	Sophomore	Romeoville, Illinois
35	Kyle Odister	Guard	7-2	185	Senior	Sacramento, California
42	Anthony Silvestri	Forward	6–7	218	Junior	San Francisco, California
44	Zach Gordon	Forward	6–8	229	Sophomore	Lynnwood, Washington

== Schedule ==
Date time, TV	Rank^{#}	Opponent^{#}	Result	Record	Site (attendance) city, state
Non-conference games
11/8/2013*; 7:00 pm, P12N		at No. 6 Arizona	L 62–73	0–1	McKale Center (14,545); Tucson, AZ
11/12/2013*; 7:00 pm		Nevada	L 58–60	0–2	Mott Gym (1,502); San Luis Obispo, CA
11/20/2013*; 7:00 pm, MW Net		at Fresno State	L 46–63	0–3	Save Mart Center (6,085); Fresno, CA
11/23/2013*; 3:00 pm		Bethesda	W 78–39	1–3	Mott Gym (1,101); San Luis Obispo, CA
11/29/2013*; 2:45 pm		vs. North Dakota; Global Sports Hardwood Challenge	W 70–43	2–3	Matthew Knight Arena (5,719); Eugene, OR
11/30/2013*; 12:30 pm		vs. Pacific; Global Sports Hardwood Challenge	L 71–73	2–4	Matthew Knight Arena (5,937); Eugene, OR
12/1/2013*; 7:00 pm, P12N		at No. 14 Oregon; Global Sports Hardwood Challenge	L 61–82	2–5	Matthew Knight Arena (5,580); Eugene, OR
12/7/2013*; 7:00 pm		Santa Clara	W 64–53	3–5	Mott Gym (2,016); San Luis Obispo, CA
12/14/2013*; 7:00 pm		Cal State Dominguez Hills	W 85–49	4–5	Mott Gym (1,787); San Luis Obispo, CA
12/17/2013*; 7:00 pm		at Loyola Marymount	L 59–79	4–6	Gersten Pavilion (370); Los Angeles, CA
12/21/2013*; 4:00 pm		at Pittsburgh	L 56–73	4–7	Petersen Events Center (9,736); Pittsburgh, PA
12/29/2013*; 7:00 pm, P12N		at Stanford	L 62–79	4–8	Maples Pavilion (4,799); Stanford, CA
1/4/2014*; 4:00 pm		at Delaware	L 72–82	4–9	Bob Carpenter Center (1,980); Newark, DE
Conference games
1/9/2014; 7:00 pm		Hawaiʻi	W 77–65	5–9 (1–0)	Mott Gym (2,559); San Luis Obispo, CA
1/11/2014; 4:00 pm		at UC Santa Barbara	W 72–64	6–9 (2–0)	The Thunderdome (5,982); Santa Barbara, CA
1/16/2014; 7:00 pm		Cal State Northridge	W 62–52	7–9 (3–0)	Mott Gym (2,248); San Luis Obispo, CA
1/18/2014; 7:00 pm		Long Beach State	L 62–63	7–10 (3–1)	Mott Gym (2,924); San Luis Obispo, CA
1/23/2014; 7:00 pm, ESPN3		at Cal State Fullerton	W 58–56	8–10 (4–1)	Titan Gym (1,345); Fullerton, CA
1/25/2014; 7:00 pm		at UC Riverside	L 58–61	8–11 (4–2)	UC Riverside Student Recreation Center (1,196); Riverside, CA
1/30/2014; 7:00 pm		UC Davis	L 58–62	8–12 (4–3)	Mott Gym (2,242); San Luis Obispo, CA
2/1/2014; 7:00 pm		UC Irvine	L 50–64	8–13 (4–4)	Mott Gym (3,032); San Luis Obispo, CA
2/8/2014; 9:00 pm, OC Sports		at Hawaiʻi	L 60–69	8–14 (4–5)	Stan Sheriff Center (7,308); Honolulu, HI
2/13/2014; 7:05 pm		at Cal State Northridge	W 62–55	9–14 (5–5)	Matadome (1,083); Northridge, CA
2/15/2014; 7:00 pm, Prime Ticket		at Long Beach State	L 65–74	9–15 (5–6)	Walter Pyramid (2,422); Long Beach, CA
2/20/2014; 7:00 pm		Cal State Fullerton	L 59–67	9–16 (5–7)	Mott Gym (1,564); San Luis Obispo, CA
2/22/2014; 7:00 pm		UC Riverside	W 69–64	10–16 (6–7)	Mott Gym (2,029); San Luis Obispo, CA
2/27/2014; 7:00 pm		at UC Davis	L 73–85	10–17 (6–8)	The Pavilion (1,190); Davis, CA
3/1/2014; 7:00 pm, ESPNU		at UC Irvine	L 48–55	10–18 (6–9)	Bren Events Center (2,422); Irvine, CA
3/8/2014; 7:00 pm		UC Santa Barbara	L 55–71	10–19 (6–10)	Mott Gym (3,202); San Luis Obispo, CA
Big West tournament
03/13/2014 noon		vs. UC Santa Barbara; Quarterfinals	W 69–38	11–19	Honda Center (N/A); Anaheim, CA
03/14/2014; 6:30 pm, ESPNU		vs. UC Irvine; Semifinals	W 61–58	12–19	Honda Center (4,589); Anaheim, CA
03/15/2014; 7:30 pm, ESPN2		vs. Cal State Northridge; Championship	W 61–59	13–19	Honda Center (3,626); Anaheim, CA
NCAA tournament
3/19/2014*; 3:40 pm, truTV	No. (16 MW)	vs. (16 MW) Texas Southern; First Four	W 81–69	14–19	University of Dayton Arena (11,534); Dayton, OH
3/21/2014*; 4:10 pm, CBS	No. (16 MW)	vs. No. 2 (1 MW) Wichita State; First round	L 37–64	14–20	Scottrade Center (19,223); St. Louis, MO
*Non-conference game. ^{#}Rankings from AP Poll, (#) during NCAA Tournament is seed within region MW=Midwest. (#) Tournament seedings in parentheses. All times are in Pacific Time.
