= 2013–14 Cal State Fullerton Titans men's basketball team =

American college basketball season

2013–14 Cal State Fullerton Titans men's basketball
- Conference: Big West Conference
- Record: 11–20 (6–10 Big West)
- Head coach: Dedrique Taylor (1st season)
- Assistant coaches: John Smith; Robert Spence; Danny Sprinkle
- Home arena: Titan Gym

2013–14 Big West men's basketball standings
	Conf.				Overall
Team	W		L	PCT	W		L	PCT
UC Irvine	13	–	3	.813	23	–	12	.657
UC Santa Barbara	12	–	4	.750	21	–	9	.700
Long Beach State	10	–	6	.625	15	–	17	.469
Hawai'i	9	–	7	.563	20	–	11	.645
Cal State Northridge	7	–	9	.438	17	–	18	.486
Cal Poly †	6	–	10	.375	14	–	20	.412
Cal State Fullerton	6	–	10	.375	11	–	20	.355
UC Riverside	5	–	11	.313	10	–	21	.323
UC Davis	4	–	12	.250	9	–	22	.290
† 2014 Big West tournament winner

The 2013–14 Cal State Fullerton Titans men's basketball team represented California State University, Fullerton during the 2013–14 NCAA Division I men's basketball season. The Titans, led by first year head coach Dedrique Taylor, played their home games at Titan Gym as members of the Big West Conference. The Titans brought in a whole new coaching staff this season with Josh Smith, Robert Spence, and Danny Sprinkle joining Taylor as first-year assistant coaches. They finished the season 11–20, 6–10 in Big West play to finish in a tie for sixth place. They lost in the quarterfinals of the Big West Conference tournament to Long Beach State.

== Season ==
=== Preseason ===
Cal State Fullerton announced the hiring of former Arizona State associate head coach Dedrique Taylor as the program's 10th head coach on April 3, 2013. Taylor replaced Andy Newman, who spent one season as the Titans' interim head coach. Taylor had been with Arizona State since 2006, serving as an assistant for four seasons and spending the past three years as an associate head coach. He had spent time as an assistant at UC Davis, Loyola Marymount, Portland State, and Nevada prior.

Taylor completed his first recruiting class as the head man for the Titans on May 8, 2013, with the announcement of the signing of forward Joe Boyd. Boyd, a forward from Scottsdale, Arizona, joined guard Sheldon Blackwell (from Rancho Cucamonga, California) as the second and final member of the Titans' 2013 recruiting class.

The Titans completed their coaching staff on May 17, 2013. All three of Cal State Fullerton's assistants from the season prior had left, and Taylor replaced them with John Smith, Danny Sprinkle, and Robert Spence. Smith, who had spent nine years as the head coach of Riverside City College, joined as an associate head coach, while Sprinkle, an assistant with Cal State Northridge, and Spence, who came over with Taylor as Arizona State's Director of Basketball Operations, joined as assistant coaches.

On August 15, 2013, Taylor welcomed four newcomers to the squad, introducing Dutch freshmen Floris Versteeg and Hiddie Vos, DePaul transfer Moses Morgan, and walk-on Ian Spruce. Morgan, due to NCAA rules, was forced to sit out the 2013–14 season after averaging 6.6 points over three seasons for the Blue Demons. Versteeg, Vos, and Spruce all joined the team as true freshmen with four years of eligibility remaining.

Taylor announced the finalization of the Titans' schedule a day later on August 16. Key games on the Titans' schedule included road games against USC, San Jose State, and UNLV, along with home games against Seattle and Sacramento State. The Titans also scheduled to play in The Wooden Legacy with teams such as Marquette and Miami (FL). The Titans' 16 game conference schedule included one home game and one away game against each of the eight other members of the Big West Conference.

On August 21, 2013, Taylor announced the additions of two more junior college transfers. Taylor received commitments from Riverside City College and former Hampton Pirates guard Corey Walker, and Trinity Valley Community College and former North Dakota guard Josh Gentry. Walker needed to sit out the season due to transfer rules while Gentry was eligible immediately as a junior.

The Titans opened their season with an easy exhibition victory over the University of Redlands, winning 108–77.

== Roster ==
2013–14 Cal State Fullerton Titans men's basketball team
Players
Coaches

Pos.	#	Name	Height	Weight	Year	Previous school	Hometown
F	0	Marquis Horne	6 ft 6 in (1.98 m)	225 lb (102 kg)	Sr	Princeton Academy; Salt Lake CC	Cincinnati, OH
G	1	Jared Brandon	6 ft 4 in (1.93 m)	200 lb (91 kg)	So	Canyon Springs HS	North Las Vegas, NV
G	2	Josh Gentry	6 ft 4 in (1.93 m)	180 lb (82 kg)	Jr	Pike HS; North Dakota; Trinity Valley CC	Indianapolis, IN
F	3	Moses Morgan (I)	6 ft 6 in (1.98 m)	220 lb (100 kg)	Sr	Palo Verde HS; DePaul	Las Vegas, NV
G	4	James Douglas	6 ft 0 in (1.83 m)	175 lb (79 kg)	Jr	Orange Lutheran HS; Northern Arizona	Orange, CA
G	5	Corey Waler (I)	6 ft 5 in (1.96 m)	190 lb (86 kg)	Sr	Santa Monica HS; Riverside City College; Hampton	Santa Monica, CA
G	10	Michael Williams	6 ft 2 in (1.88 m)	185 lb (84 kg)	RS Sr	Taft HS; San Francisco	Van Nuys, CA
F	13	Joe Boyd	6 ft 9 in (2.06 m)	240 lb (109 kg)	Fr	Chaparral HS	Scottsdale, AZ
G	15	Hidde Vos	6 ft 4 in (1.93 m)	195 lb (88 kg)	Fr	Canarias Basketball Academy	Barendrecht, Netherlands
F	21	Steve McClellan	6 ft 7 in (2.01 m)	250 lb (113 kg)	RS Jr	Edison HS; Louisiana–Monroe	Fresno, CA
G	22	Sheldon Blackwell	6 ft 5 in (1.96 m)	175 lb (79 kg)	Fr	Etiwanda HS	Rancho Cucamonga, CA
G	23	Alex Harris	6 ft 1 in (1.85 m)	170 lb (77 kg)	RS Jr	El Cerrito HS; Northeastern	Richmond, CA
G	24	Ian Spruce (W)	6 ft 4 in (1.93 m)	185 lb (84 kg)	Fr	Price HS	Playa Vista, CA
F	31	Floris Versteeg	6 ft 9 in (2.06 m)	215 lb (98 kg)	Fr	Canarias Basketball Academy	Amsterdam, Netherlands
G	32	Chris Collins	6 ft 4 in (1.93 m)	185 lb (84 kg)	RS Jr	Chino Hills HS	Chino, CA
F	33	James Johnson	6 ft 7 in (2.01 m)	240 lb (109 kg)	Sr	Campbell Hall HS; Louisiana Tech; Central Wyoming College	North Hills, CA

Head coach

- Dedrique Taylor (UC Davis)

Assistant coach(es)

- John Smith (Dominican (CA))
- Danny Sprinkle (Montana State)
- Robert Spence (Guilford)

Legend

- (C) Team captain
- (S) Suspended
- (I) Ineligible
- (W) Walk-on
- Injured
- Current redshirt

== Schedule and results ==
Date time, TV	Opponent	Result	Record	Site (attendance) city, state
Exhibition
11/02/2013*; 6:00 pm	Redlands	W 108–77	–	Titan Gym (N/A); Fullerton, CA
Non-conference games
11/09/2013*; 3:35 pm	at Montana State	W 84–55	1–0	Worthington Arena (2,046); Bozeman, MT
11/13/2013*; 7:00 pm, RTNW	at Seattle	L 71–75	1–1	KeyArena (2,064); Seattle, WA
11/16/2013*; 3:00 pm	Santa Clara	W 86–73	2–1	Titan Gym (N/A); Fullerton, CA
11/19/2013*; 8:00 pm, P12N	at USC	L 62–76	2–2	Galen Center (3,152); Los Angeles, CA
11/23/2013*; 12:30 pm	at San Jose State	L 59–81	2–3	Event Center Arena (1,284); San Jose, CA
11/28/2013*; 1:30 pm, ESPN2	No. 25 Marquette; The Wooden Legacy First Round	L 66–86	2–4	Titan Gym (1,966); Fullerton, CA
11/29/2013*; 3:10 pm, ESPN3	Miami (FL); The Wooden Legacy Consolation 2nd round	L 46–48	2–5	Titan Gym (1,857); Fullerton, CA
12/01/2013*; 1:30 pm, ESPNU	vs. Charleston; The Wooden Legacy 7th place game	L 48–61	2–6	Honda Center (6,007); Anaheim, CA
12/04/2013*; 7:00 pm	at Pepperdine	W 78–64	3–6	Firestone Fieldhouse (592); Malibu, CA
12/07/2013*; 6:00 pm	Seattle	L 65–74	3–7	Titan Gym (659); Fullerton, CA
12/15/2013*; 2:05 pm	Texas Southern	W 87–80	4–7	Titan Gym (573); Fullerton, CA
12/21/2013*; 3:05 pm	Sacramento State	W 59–51	5–7	Titan Gym (833); Fullerton, CA
12/28/2013*; 7:00 pm, Cox 96	at UNLV	L 64–83	5–8	Thomas & Mack Center (12,551); Paradise, NV
01/04/2014*; 10:00 am	at Tulsa	L 57–73	5–9	Reynolds Center (4,214); Tulsa, OK
Conference games
1/9/2014; 7:00 pm	UC Riverside	W 78–73	6–9 (1–0)	Titan Gym (879); Fullerton, CA
1/16/2014; 7:00 pm	at UC Irvine	L 54–72	6–10 (1–1)	Bren Events Center (2,352); Irvine, CA
1/18/2014; 7:00 pm	at UC Davis	L 61–69	6–11 (1–2)	The Pavilion (2,216); Davis, CA
1/23/2014; 7:00 pm, ESPN3	Cal Poly	L 56–58	6–12 (1–3)	Titan Gym (1,345); Fullerton, CA
1/25/2014; 7:00 pm, Prime Ticket	UC Santa Barbara	W 74–72	7–12 (2–3)	Titan Gym (1,772); Fullerton, CA
2/1/2014; 8:00 pm	at Long Beach State	L 56–75	7–13 (2–4)	Walter Pyramid (3,762); Long Beach, CA
2/6/2014; 7:00 pm, ESPN3	at UC Riverside	L 69–72	7–14 (2–5)	UC Riverside Student Recreation Center (783); Riverside, CA
2/8/2014; 7:00 pm	at Cal State Northridge	L 83–92 ^{OT}	7–15 (2–6)	Matadome (1,227); Northridge, CA
2/13/2014; 7:00 pm	UC Davis	W 74–64	8–15 (3–6)	Titan Gym (731); Fullerton, CA
2/15/2014; 6:00 pm, ESPN3	Hawaiʻi	L 80–83	8–16 (3–7)	Titan Gym (3,017); Fullerton, CA
2/20/2014; 7:00 pm	at Cal Poly	W 67–59	9–16 (4–7)	Mott Gym (1,564); San Luis Obispo, CA
2/22/2014; 4:00 pm	at UC Santa Barbara	L 65–80	9–17 (4–8)	UC Santa Barbara Events Center (2,737); Santa Barbara, CA
2/27/2014; 7:00 pm	Cal State Northridge	W 82–81	10–17 (5–8)	Titan Gym (747); Fullerton, CA
3/1/2014; 6:00 pm, ESPN3	Long Beach State	W 84–76	11–17 (6–8)	Titan Gym (1,806); Fullerton, CA
3/6/2014; 7:00 pm	UC Irvine	L 44–62	11–18 (6–9)	Titan Gym (1,617); Fullerton, CA
3/9/2014; 9:00 pm, OC Sports	at Hawaiʻi	L 77–81	11–19 (6–10)	(8,688); Hawaii
Big West tournament
3/13/2014; 2:30 pm, FS Prime Ticket	vs. Long Beach State; Quarterfinals	L 56–66	11–20	Honda Center (N/A); Anaheim, CA
*Non-conference game. ^{#}Rankings from AP Poll. (#) Tournament seedings in parentheses. All times are in Pacific Time.
