= 2013–14 UC Irvine Anteaters men's basketball team =

American college basketball season

2013–14 UC Irvine Anteaters men's basketball

Big West Regular Season Champions

NIT first round vs. SMU, L 54–68
- Conference: Big West Conference
- Record: 23–12 (13–3 Big West)
- Head coach: Russell Turner (4th season)
- Assistant coaches: Ali Ton; Ryan Badrtalei; Nick Booker
- Home arena: Bren Events Center

2013–14 Big West men's basketball standings
| | Conf. | | | | Overall |
| Team | W | | L | PCT | W | | L | PCT |
|---|---|---|---|---|---|---|---|---|
| UC Irvine | 13 | – | 3 | .813 | 23 | – | 12 | .657 |
| UC Santa Barbara | 12 | – | 4 | .750 | 21 | – | 9 | .700 |
| Long Beach State | 10 | – | 6 | .625 | 15 | – | 17 | .469 |
| Hawai'i | 9 | – | 7 | .563 | 20 | – | 11 | .645 |
| Cal State Northridge | 7 | – | 9 | .438 | 17 | – | 18 | .486 |
| Cal Poly † | 6 | – | 10 | .375 | 14 | – | 20 | .412 |
| Cal State Fullerton | 6 | – | 10 | .375 | 11 | – | 20 | .355 |
| UC Riverside | 5 | – | 11 | .313 | 10 | – | 21 | .323 |
| UC Davis | 4 | – | 12 | .250 | 9 | – | 22 | .290 |
† 2014 Big West tournament winner

The 2013–14 UC Irvine Anteaters men's basketball team represented the University of California, Irvine during the 2013–14 NCAA Division I men's basketball season. The Anteaters were led by fourth year head coach Russell Turner and played their home games at the Bren Events Center. They were members of the Big West Conference. They finished the season 23–12, 13–3 in Big West play to win the Big West regular season championship. They advanced to the Big West Conference tournament where they lost to Cal Poly. As a regular season conference champion who failed to win their conference tournament they earned an automatic bid to the National Invitation Tournament where they lost in the first round to SMU.

== Off-Season ==
=== 2013 Recruiting Class ===
College recruiting information
| Name | Hometown | School | Height | Weight | Commit date |
|---|---|---|---|---|---|
| Mamadou Ndiaye; C | Dakar, Senegal | Brethren Christian High School | 7 ft 5 in (2.26 m) | 310 lb (140 kg) | Nov 14, 2012 |
| Mamadou Ndiaye; C | Recruit ratings: Scout: Rivals: 247Sports: ESPN: (85) | | | | |
| Ioannis Dimakopoulos; C | Patras, Greece | Cathedral High School | 7 ft 2 in (2.18 m) | N/A | |
| Ioannis Dimakopoulos; C | Recruit ratings: No ratings found | | | | |
| Luke Nelson; PG | London, England | | 6 ft 3 in (1.91 m) | 190 lb (86 kg) | |
| Luke Nelson; PG | Recruit ratings: No ratings found | | | | |
Overall recruit ranking: Scout: n/a Rivals: n/a ESPN: n/a
Note: In many cases, Scout, Rivals, 247Sports, On3, and ESPN may conflict in their listings of height and weight.; In these cases, the average was taken. ESPN grades are on a 100-point scale.; Sources: "ESPN - UC Irvine Basketball Recruiting 2013". ESPN.; "2013 Team Ranking". Rivals.

== Roster ==
2013–14 UC Irvine Anteaters men's basketball team
Players
Coaches

| Pos. | # | Name | Height | Weight | Year | Hometown |
|---|---|---|---|---|---|---|
| C | 33 | Mike Best (redshirt) | 6 ft 10 in (2.08 m) | 205 lb (93 kg) | So | San Rafael, California |
| C | 42 | Conor Clifford | 7 ft 0 in (2.13 m) | 268 lb (122 kg) | So | Huntington Beach, California |
| F | 3 | Will Davis II | 6 ft 8 in (2.03 m) | 210 lb (95 kg) | Jr | Sacramento, California |
| F/C | 12 | Ioannis Dimakopoulos | 7 ft 2 in (2.18 m) | 255 lb (116 kg) | Fr | Patras, Greece |
| G | 24 | Dominique Dunning | 6 ft 3 in (1.91 m) | 213 lb (97 kg) | RS So | Corona, California |
| F | 35 | Ege Mala | 6 ft 7 in (2.01 m) | 208 lb (94 kg) | RS Fr | İzmir (Turkey) |
| G | 0 | Jaron Martin | 5 ft 10 in (1.78 m) | 160 lb (73 kg) | Fr | Sunland, California |
| F | 4 | Reed McConnell | 6 ft 5 in (1.96 m) | 190 lb (86 kg) | So | Atherton, California |
| G | 5 | Chris McNealy | 6 ft 4 in (1.93 m) | 182 lb (83 kg) | Sr | Danville, California |
| C | 34 | Mamadou N'Diaye | 7 ft 6 in (2.29 m) | 290 lb (132 kg) | Fr | Dakar, Sengal |
| G | 10 | Luke Nelson | 6 ft 3 in (1.91 m) | 182 lb (83 kg) | Fr | Worthing, England |
| F | 20 | Shawn Rey | 6 ft 8 in (2.03 m) | 232 lb (105 kg) | Jr | Torrance, California |
| C | 25 | John Ryan | 6 ft 10 in (2.08 m) | 247 lb (112 kg) | Jr | El Segundo, California |
| F | 2 | Travis Souza | 6 ft 4 in (1.93 m) | 222 lb (101 kg) | Jr | Turlock, California |
| G | 32 | Aaron Wright | 6 ft 3 in (1.91 m) | 188 lb (85 kg) | So | Cerritos, California |
| G | 1 | Alex Young | 6 ft 1 in (1.85 m) | 176 lb (80 kg) | So | Phoenix, Oregon |

Head coach

- Russell Turner (Hampden–Sydney)

Assistant coach(es)

- Ali Ton (Davidson)
- Ryan Badtalei (UCLA)
- Nick Booker (Davidson)

Legend

- (C) Team captain
- (S) Suspended
- (I) Ineligible
- (W) Walk-on
- Injured
- Current redshirt

Roster

== Schedule ==
| Date time, TV | Rank^{#} | Opponent^{#} | Result | Record | Site (attendance) city, state |
Exhibition
| 11/02/2013*; 7:00 pm | | Chapman | W 89–61 | – | Bren Events Center (1,601); Irvine, CA |
Regular season
| 11/08/2013*; 7:00 pm | | Fresno State | L 97–98 ^{OT} | 0–1 | Bren Events Center (3,241); Irvine, CA |
| 11/12/2013*; 7:00 pm | | at Pacific | L 79–84 | 0–2 | Alex G. Spanos Center (1,862); Stockton, CA |
| 11/14/2013*; 8:00 pm, P12N | | at Washington; 2K Sports Classic | W 86–72 | 1–2 | Alaska Airlines Arena (5,875); Seattle, WA |
| 11/17/2013*; 7:00 pm | | Pacifica | W 110–73 | 2–2 | Bren Events Center (1,709); Irvine, CA |
| 11/22/2013*; 7:00 pm | | Long Island; 2K Sports Classic | W 84–64 | 3–2 | Bren Events Center (2,379); Irvine, CA |
| 11/23/2013*; 5:30 pm | | Boston University; 2K Sports Classic | L 68–74 | 3–3 | Bren Events Center (2,108); Irvine, CA |
| 11/24/2013*; 4:00 pm | | Eastern Washington; 2K Sports Classic | W 81–58 | 4–3 | Bren Events Center (1,576); Irvine, CA |
| 11/30/2013*; 7:05 pm | | at Sacramento State | W 79–53 | 5–3 | Colberg Court (961); Sacramento, CA |
| 12/02/2013*; 7:30 pm, P12N | | at California | L 56–73 | 5–4 | Haas Pavilion (7,980); Berkeley, CA |
| 12/07/2013*; 7:00 pm | | Pepperdine | L 69–75 | 5–5 | Bren Events Center (2,283); Irvine, CA |
| 12/15/2013*; 2:05 pm | | at Eastern Washington | W 70–61 | 6–5 | Reese Court (911); Cheney, WA |
| 12/17/2013*; 7:30 pm, P12N | | at No. 13 Oregon | L 63–91 | 6–6 | Matthew Knight Arena (5,958); Eugene, OR |
| 12/21/2013*; 1:00 pm | | at Denver | W 63–50 | 7–6 | Magness Arena (2,754); Denver, CO |
| 12/28/2013*; 11:00 am, P12N | | at Arizona State | L 61–74 | 7–7 | Wells Fargo Arena (5,883); Tempe, AZ |
| 01/02/2014*; 7:30 pm | | Morgan State | W 75–63 | 8–7 | Bren Events Center (1,657); Irvine, CA |
| 01/04/2014*; 7:00 pm | | San Diego Christian | W 91–56 | 9–7 | Bren Events Center (1,231); Irvine, CA |
| 01/09/2014; 8:00 pm, Prime Ticket | | at Long Beach State | W 46–44 | 10–7 (1–0) | Walter Pyramid (2,817); Long Beach, CA |
| 01/11/2014; 7:00 pm | | at UC Riverside | W 72–52 | 11–7 (2–0) | UC Riverside Student Recreation Center (1,965); Riverside, CA |
| 01/16/2014; 7:00 pm, ESPN3 | | Cal State Fullerton | W 72–54 | 12–7 (3–0) | Bren Events Center (2,352); Irvine, CA |
| 01/23/2014; 7:00 pm | | Cal State Northridge | W 72–66 | 13–7 (4–0) | Bren Events Center (1,506); Irvine, CA |
| 01/25/2014; 7:00 pm, ESPN3 | | Hawaiʻi | L 86–90 ^{OT} | 13–8 (4–1) | Bren Events Center (4,305); Irvine, CA |
| 01/30/2014; 7:00 pm | | at UC Santa Barbara | L 60–80 | 13–9 (4–2) | The Thunderdome (3,013); Santa Barbara, CA |
| 02/01/2014; 8:00 pm, ESPNU | | at Cal Poly | W 64–50 | 14–9 (5–2) | Mott Gym (3,032); San Luis Obispo, CA |
| 02/06/2014; 7:30 pm, Prime Ticket | | Long Beach State | W 61–58 | 15–9 (6–2) | Bren Events Center (2,979); Irvine, CA |
| 02/08/2014; 7:00 pm | | at UC Davis | W 61–59 | 16–9 (7–2) | The Pavilion (1,598); Davis, CA |
| 02/15/2014; 7:00 pm, Cox 3 (tape delay) | | UC Riverside | W 70–52 | 17–9 (8–2) | Bren Events Center (2,986); Irvine, CA |
| 02/20/2014; 9:00 pm, OC Sports | | at Hawaiʻi | W 60–56 ^{OT} | 18–9 (9–2) | Stan Sheriff Center (6,493); Honolulu, HI |
| 02/22/2014; 7:30 pm, Prime Ticket | | at Cal State Northridge | L 75–81 | 18–10 (9–3) | Matadome (1,321); Northridge, CA |
| 02/27/2014; 7:00 pm, ESPN3 | | UC Santa Barbara | W 71–60 | 19–10 (10–3) | Bren Events Center (2,680); Irvine, CA |
| 03/01/2014; 8:00 pm, ESPNU | | Cal Poly | W 55–48 | 20–10 (11–3) | Bren Events Center (2,422); Irvine, CA |
| 03/06/2014; 7:00 pm | | at Cal State Fullerton | W 62–44 | 21–10 (12–3) | Titan Gym (1,617); Fullerton, CA |
| 03/08/2014; 4:30 pm, Prime Ticket | | UC Davis | W 74–46 | 22–10 (13–3) | Bren Events Center (2,252); Irvine, CA |
Big West tournament
| 03/13/2014; 6:00 pm, Prime Ticket/Fox Deportes/FCS Pacific/FSSD | | vs. UC Riverside; Quarterfinals | W 63–43 | 23–10 | Honda Center (3,693); Anaheim, CA |
| 03/14/2014; 6:30 pm, ESPN3/ESPNU(delayed) | | vs. Cal Poly; Semifinals | L 58–61 | 23–11 | Honda Center (4,589); Anaheim, CA |
NIT
| 03/19/2014*; 6:00 pm, ESPN2 | No. (8) | at No. (25) (1) SMU; First round | L 54–68 | 23–12 | Moody Coliseum (5,031); Dallas, TX |
*Non-conference game. ^{#}Rankings from AP Poll, (#) during NIT is seed within region. (#) Tournament seedings in parentheses. All times are in Pacific Time.
