= Joe Callero =

American basketball coach

Biographical details
- Born: August 27, 1962 (age 64)
- Education: Central Washington

Coaching career (HC unless noted)
- 1989–1992: Highline CC
- 1992–1995: Sumner HS
- 1995–1998: Highline CC
- 1998–1999: USC (assistant)
- 1999–2001: Puget Sound
- 2001–2009: Seattle
- 2009–2019: Cal Poly
- 2021-2022: Rogers HS

Head coaching record
- Overall: 259–291

Accomplishments and honors

Championships
- Great Northwest regular season (2007); Big West tournament (2014)

Joseph Dominic Callero (born August 26, 1962) is an American college basketball coach, most recently the head men's basketball coach at California Polytechnic State University-San Luis Obispo (Cal Poly). He replaced outgoing coach Kevin Bromley in 2009.

Prior to accepting the job at Cal Poly, Callero spent eight seasons as the head coach at Seattle University.

Callero grew up with his Italian Catholic family in Enumclaw, Washington, and is one of 16 children. He is married to his wife of 25 years, Erika and has a 21-year-old daughter.

== Head coaching record ==
Record table
Season	Team	Overall	Conference	Standing	Postseason
Puget Sound Loggers (Northwest Conference) (1999–2001)
1999–00	Puget Sound	8–15	6–10	7th	
2000–01	Puget Sound	14–10	8–8	4th	
Puget Sound:		22–25	14–18		
Seattle Redhawks (Great Northwest Athletic Conference) (2001–2008)
2001–02	Seattle	6–23	4–14	9th	
2002–03	Seattle	16–11	9–9	7th	
2003–04	Seattle	9–18	5–13	T–8th	
2004–05	Seattle	11–16	6–12	8th	
2005–06	Seattle	16–11	9–9	7th	
2006–07	Seattle	20–9	11–5	T–1st	NCAA Division II Second Round
2007–08	Seattle	18–9	11–7	8th	
Seattle Redhawks (NCAA Division I independent) (2008–2009)
2008–09	Seattle	21–8			
Seattle:		117–105 (.527)	55–69 (.444)		
Cal Poly Mustangs (Big West Conference) (2009–2019)
2009–10	Cal Poly	12–19	7–9	6th	
2010–11	Cal Poly	15–15	10–6	2nd	
2011–12	Cal Poly	18–15	8–8	4th	
2012–13	Cal Poly	18–14	12–6	3rd	CIT First Round
2013–14	Cal Poly	14–20	6–10	T–6th	NCAA Second Round
2014–15	Cal Poly	13–16	6–10	7th	
2015–16	Cal Poly	10–20	4–12	8th	
2016–17	Cal Poly	11–20	6–10	7th	
2017–18	Cal Poly	9–22	4–12	T–7th	
2018–19	Cal Poly	6–23	2–14	9th	
Cal Poly:		126–184 (.406)	65–91 (.417)		
Total:		259–293 (.469)			
National champion Postseason invitational champion Conference regular season champion Conference regular season and conference tournament champion Division regular season champion Division regular season and conference tournament champion Conference tournament champion
