= 2013–14 UC Riverside Highlanders men's basketball team =

American college basketball season

2013–14 UC Riverside Highlanders men's basketball
- Conference: Big West Conference
- Record: 10–21 (5–11 Big West)
- Head coach: Dennis Cutts (1st season)
- Assistant coaches: Mike Miller; Justin Bell; Stephen Sauers
- Home arena: Student Recreation Center Arena

2013–14 Big West men's basketball standings
	Conf.				Overall
Team	W		L	PCT	W		L	PCT
UC Irvine	13	–	3	.813	23	–	12	.657
UC Santa Barbara	12	–	4	.750	21	–	9	.700
Long Beach State	10	–	6	.625	15	–	17	.469
Hawai'i	9	–	7	.563	20	–	11	.645
Cal State Northridge	7	–	9	.438	17	–	18	.486
Cal Poly †	6	–	10	.375	14	–	20	.412
Cal State Fullerton	6	–	10	.375	11	–	20	.355
UC Riverside	5	–	11	.313	10	–	21	.323
UC Davis	4	–	12	.250	9	–	22	.290
† 2014 Big West tournament winner

The 2013–14 UC Riverside Highlanders men's basketball team represented the University of California, Riverside during the 2013–14 NCAA Division I men's basketball season. The Highlanders are led by first year head coach Dennis Cutts and played their home games at the Student Recreation Center Arena as members of the Big West Conference. They finished the season 10–21, 5–11 in Big West play to finish in eighth place. They lost in the quarterfinals of the Big West Conference tournament to UC Irvine.

== Season ==
=== Preseason ===
Sam Finley was the only recruit that UC Riverside signed in their 2013-14 class, and the shooting guard from Corona, California, signed his Letter of Intent on November 16, 2012. The 6'2", 180 pound guard was rated as a two-star prospect by ESPN.com. Finley averaged 19.4 points per game in his senior season for Centennial High School.

On July 10, 2013, Jim Wooldridge, who had been the Highlanders' head coach for the past six seasons, was named UC Riverside's interim athletic director, replacing Brian Wickstrom, who left to take the AD job at the University of Louisiana at Monroe. Wooldridge had amassed 70 wins over six years as the Highlanders' head coach. Longtime assistant coach Dennis Cutts was named as Wooldridge's interim successor.

Cutts announced the team's complete season schedule on July 23, 2013. The Highlanders' notable games featured road match-ups against San Diego State, Southern Utah, Air Force, and North Texas. UC Riverside also announced that they would play host to teams such as Montana State, Pepperdine, and Northern Illinois. The Highlanders' 16-game conference slate included one home game and one away game against each of the other eight members of the Big West Conference.

On August 14, 2013, Cutts announced the hiring of 23 year coaching veteran Steven Sauers to fill the open assistant coaching spot left vacant when Cutts took the head coaching job. Sauers had previously served as the director of basketball operations for the Seton Hall Pirates, and also spent time as an assistant for Marist and Iona.

The Highlanders played one preseason exhibition on November 1, against Pomona-Pitzer, winning by a score of 83–73. Chris Patton led the Highlanders with 27 points in the exhibition victory.

== Roster ==
2013–14 UC Riverside Highlanders men's basketball team
Players
Coaches

Pos.	#	Name	Height	Weight	Year	Previous school	Hometown
G	0	Nick Gruninger	5 ft 10 in (1.78 m)	160 lb (73 kg)	Jr	Davis HS; Snow CC	Kaysville, UT
G	1	Sam Finley	6 ft 2 in (1.88 m)	185 lb (84 kg)	Fr	Centennial HS	Riverside, CA
G	3	Charles Standifer	6 ft 5 in (1.96 m)	185 lb (84 kg)	Jr	Capital Christian HS	Sacramento, CA
F	5	Taylor Johns	6 ft 7 in (2.01 m)	220 lb (100 kg)	So	Sacred Heart Prep	San Francisco, CA
G	10	Steven Jones	6 ft 0 in (1.83 m)	175 lb (79 kg)	So	Taft HS	Winnetka, CA
F	11	Tre Owens	6 ft 6 in (1.98 m)	185 lb (84 kg)	So	Farragut Career Academy	Rota, Spain
F	15	Chris Harriel	6 ft 4 in (1.93 m)	185 lb (84 kg)	Sr	King HS; Portland State	Moreno Valley, CA
F	20	Colin Gruber	6 ft 5 in (1.96 m)	190 lb (86 kg)	Jr	Harbor HS; Northern Arizona; Cabrillo CC	Aptos, CA
F	21	Lucas Devenny	6 ft 8 in (2.03 m)	240 lb (109 kg)	Sr	Piner HS; UC Santa Barbara	Santa Rosa, CA
F	24	Steven Thornton	6 ft 4 in (1.93 m)	205 lb (93 kg)	Jr	Golden Valley HS	Santa Clarita, CA
G	35	Austin Quick	6 ft 2 in (1.88 m)	180 lb (82 kg)	Jr	Murrieta Valley HS	Murrieta, CA
F	54	Chris Patton	6 ft 10 in (2.08 m)	246 lb (112 kg)	Sr	Nazareth College Prep; Southern Idaho; Neosho CC	Melbourne, Australia

Head coach

- Dennis Cutts (Albany)

Assistant coach(es)

- Mike Miller (USC)
- Justin Bell (UC Riverside)
- Steve Sauers (Albany)

Legend

- (C) Team captain
- (S) Suspended
- (I) Ineligible
- (W) Walk-on
- Injured
- Current redshirt

== Schedule and results ==
Date time, TV	Opponent	Result	Record	Site (attendance) city, state
Exhibition
11/1/2013*; 7:00 pm	Pomona-Pitzer	W 83–73	0–0	SRC Arena (N/A); Riverside, CA
Non-conference games
11/8/2013*; 7:00 pm	at San Diego State	L 41–77	0–1	Viejas Arena (12,414); San Diego, CA
11/13/2013*; 7:00 pm	Pepperdine	L 66–69	0–2	SRC Arena (N/A); Riverside, CA
11/16/2013*; 4:00 pm	Montana State	W 72–67	1–2	SRC Arena (2,355); Riverside, CA
11/23/2013*; 6:30 pm	at Southern Utah	W 74–59	2–2	Centrum Arena (1,507); Cedar City, UT
11/25/2013*; 7:00 pm, RTNW	at Seattle	L 68–69	2–3	KeyArena (1,883); Seattle, WA
12/2/2013*; 7:00 pm	Loyola Marymount	L 69–73	2–4	SRC Arena (370); Riverside, CA
12/5/2013*; 7:00 pm	La Verne	W 92–77	3–4	SRC Arena (347); Riverside, CA
12/14/2013*; 1:00 pm	at Air Force	L 52–62	3–5	Clune Arena (1,702); Colorado Springs, CO
12/16/2013*; 6:00 pm	at Northern Colorado	L 60–63	3–6	Butler–Hancock Sports Pavilion (952); Greeley, CO
12/20/2013*; 7:00 pm	UIC	W 57–56	4–6	SRC Arena (145); Riverside, CA
12/22/2013*; 2:00 pm	Northern Illinois	L 64–71	4–7	SRC Arena (236); Riverside, CA
12/29/2013*; 2:05 pm	at Sacramento State	L 67–69	4–8	Colberg Court (504); Sacramento, CA
1/2/2014*; 7:00 pm	Waldorf	W 85–43	5–8	SRC Arena (213); Riverside, CA
1/4/2014*; 12:00 pm	at North Texas	L 72–76	5–9	The Super Pit (1,872); Denton, TX
Conference games
1/9/2014; 7:00 pm	at Cal State Fullerton	L 73–78	5–10 (0–1)	Titan Gym (879); Fullerton, CA
1/11/2014; 7:00 pm	UC Irvine	L 52–72	5–11 (0–2)	SRC Arena (1,965); Riverside, CA
1/16/2014; 7:00 pm	at UC Davis	W 81–69	6–11 (1–2)	The Pavilion (2,013); Davis, CA
1/19/2014; 9:00 pm	at Hawaiʻi	L 69–100	6–12 (1–3)	Stan Sheriff Center (7,705); Honolulu, HI
1/23/2014; 7:00 pm	UC Santa Barbara	L 65–68 ^{OT}	6–13 (1–4)	SRC Arena (1,236); Riverside, CA
1/25/2014; 7:00 pm	Cal Poly	W 61–58	7–13 (2–4)	SRC Arena (1,196); Riverside, CA
1/30/2014; 7:00 pm	at Cal State Northridge	L 89–93 ^{OT}	7–14 (2–5)	Matadome (1,287); Northridge, CA
2/6/2014; 7:00 pm, ESPN3	Cal State Fullerton	W 72–69	8–14 (3–5)	SRC Arena (783); Riverside, CA
2/8/2014; 7:00 pm	Long Beach State	L 76–88	8–15 (3–6)	SRC Arena (1,064); Riverside, CA
2/13/2014; 7:00 pm	Hawaiʻi	L 76–87	8–16 (3–7)	SRC Arena (1,074); Riverside, CA
2/15/2014; 7:00 pm	at UC Irvine	L 52–70	8–17 (3–8)	Bren Events Center (2,986); Irvine, CA
2/20/2014; 7:00 pm	at UC Santa Barbara	L 54–55	8–18 (3–9)	UC Santa Barbara Events Center (2,417); Santa Barbara, CA
2/22/2014; 7:00 pm	at Cal Poly	L 64–69	8–19 (3–10)	Mott Gym (2,029); San Luis Obispo, CA
3/1/2014; 7:00 pm	Cal State Northridge	W 106–105 ^{2OT}	9–19 (4–10)	SRC Arena (663); Riverside, CA
3/6/2014; 7:00 pm	UC Davis	W 78–65	10–19 (5–10)	SRC Arena (1,485); Riverside, CA
3/8/2014; 4:00 pm, ESPN3	at Long Beach State	L 67–74	10–20 (5–11)	Walter Pyramid (2,151); Long Beach, CA
Big West tournament
03/13/2014; 6:00 pm	vs. UC Irvine; Quarterfinals	L 43–63	10–21	Honda Center (3,693); Anaheim, CA
*Non-conference game. ^{#}Rankings from AP Poll. (#) Tournament seedings in parentheses. All times are in Pacific Time.
