= 2013–14 Hawaii Rainbow Warriors basketball team =

American college basketball season

2013–14 Hawaii Rainbow Warriors men's basketball
- Conference: Big West Conference
- Record: 0–11, 20 wins vacated (0–7 (9 wins vacated) Big West)
- Head coach: Gib Arnold (4th season)
- Assistant coaches: Benjy Taylor; Brandyn Akana; Scott Fisher; Chris McMillan (Director of Basketball Operations); Jamie Smith (Video Coordinator)
- Home arena: Stan Sheriff Center

2013–14 Big West men's basketball standings
	Conf.				Overall
Team	W		L	PCT	W		L	PCT
UC Irvine	13	–	3	.813	23	–	12	.657
UC Santa Barbara	12	–	4	.750	21	–	9	.700
Long Beach State	10	–	6	.625	15	–	17	.469
Hawai'i	9	–	7	.563	20	–	11	.645
Cal State Northridge	7	–	9	.438	17	–	18	.486
Cal Poly †	6	–	10	.375	14	–	20	.412
Cal State Fullerton	6	–	10	.375	11	–	20	.355
UC Riverside	5	–	11	.313	10	–	21	.323
UC Davis	4	–	12	.250	9	–	22	.290
† 2014 Big West tournament winner

The 2013–14 Hawaii Rainbow Warriors basketball team represented the University of Hawaiʻi at Mānoa during the 2013–14 NCAA Division I men's basketball season. The Rainbow Warriors, led by fourth year head coach Gib Arnold, played their home games at the Stan Sheriff Center as members of the Big West Conference. They finished the season 20–11, 9–7 in Big West play to finish in fourth place. They lost in the quarterfinals of the Big West Conference tournament to Cal State Northridge. Despite having 20 wins, they did not participate in a postseason tournament.

In October 2014, Hawaii fired head coach Gib Arnold and assistant coach Brandyn Akana, due to an NCAA investigation.

In 2015, Hawaii announced it would vacate all wins from this and the 2012–13 season due to the participation of Isaac Fotu, who was ineligible due to improper benefits.

== Season ==
=== Preseason ===
Head coach Gib Arnold announced the team's full season schedule on August 28, 2013. The main attraction on the schedule was the announcement that Hawaiʻi would host the Outrigger Hotels Rainbow Classic, as well as the annual Diamond Head Classic. Other key non-conference games included a road game at Missouri and a home game against Montana, both participants in the 2013 NCAA Men's Division I Basketball Tournament. In the conference slate, the Rainbow Warriors were scheduled for one home game and one away game against each of the other eight members of the Big West Conference.

== Roster ==
2013–14 Hawaii Rainbow Warriors men's basketball team
Players
Coaches

Pos.	#	Name	Height	Weight	Year	Previous school	Hometown
G	0	Keith Shamburger	5 ft 11 in (1.8 m)	170 lb (77 kg)	Jr	Serra HS; San Jose State	Los Angeles, CA
G	1	Garrett Nevels	6 ft 2 in (1.88 m)	190 lb (86 kg)	Jr	Palisades Charter HS; Mount San Antonio College	Los Angeles, CA
G	2	Niko Filipovich	6 ft 0 in (1.83 m)	160 lb (73 kg)	Fr	Bishop Montgomery HS	Rancho Palos Verdes, CA
G	3	Brandon Jawato	6 ft 4 in (1.93 m)	200 lb (91 kg)	So	El Segundo HS	El Segundo, CA
G	10	Dyrbe Enos	5 ft 9 in (1.75 m)	170 lb (77 kg)	RS Fr	Kamehameha Schools-Kapalama	Aiea, HI
G	11	Quincy Smith	6 ft 0 in (1.83 m)	170 lb (77 kg)	So	Deer Valley HS; City College of San Francisco	Antioch, CA
C	13	Davis Rozitis	7 ft 0 in (2.13 m)	240 lb (109 kg)	Sr	Cēsis State Grammar School; USC	Cēsis, Latvia
G	14	Negus Webster-Chan	6 ft 7 in (2.01 m)	200 lb (91 kg)	So	Huntington Prep; Missouri	Scarborough, Ontario
C	15	Stefan Jovanovic	6 ft 10 in (2.08 m)	235 lb (107 kg)	Fr	Bishop Montgomery HS	Kraljevo, Serbia
G	21	Jack Hackman	6 ft 4 in (1.93 m)	180 lb (82 kg)	Fr	Jesuit HS	Portland, OR
G	23	Aaron Valdes	6 ft 5 in (1.96 m)	190 lb (86 kg)	RS Fr	La Serna HS	Whittier, CA
G	24	Michael Harper	6 ft 4 in (1.93 m)	200 lb (91 kg)	So	Trinity Grammar School	Melbourne, Australia
F	25	Mike Thomas	6 ft 8 in (2.03 m)	215 lb (98 kg)	Fr	El Camino Real HS	Woodland Hills, CA
G	32	Brandon Spearman	6 ft 3 in (1.91 m)	200 lb (91 kg)	Sr	Simeon Career Academy; Indian Hills CC	Chicago, IL
F	34	Christian Standhardinger	6 ft 8 in (2.03 m)	220 lb (100 kg)	Sr	Erdgas Ehingen; Nebraska	Munich, Germany
F	42	Isaac Fotu	6 ft 8 in (2.03 m)	230 lb (104 kg)	So	Rangitoto College	Torbay, New Zealand
C	54	Caleb Dressler	6 ft 10 in (2.08 m)	245 lb (111 kg)	RS Fr	Evergreen HS	Vancouver, WA

Head coach

- Gib Arnold (UC San Diego)

Assistant coach(es)

- Benjy Taylor (Richmond)
- Brandyn Akana (BYU–Hawaii)
- Scott Fisher (basketball) (UC Santa Barbara)
- Chris McMiliian (Wyoming) - Director of Basketball Operations
- Jamie Smith (North Carolina) - Video Coordinator

Legend

- (C) Team captain
- (S) Suspended
- (I) Ineligible
- (W) Walk-on
- Injured
- Current redshirt

== Schedule and results ==
Date time, TV	Opponent	Result	Record	Site (attendance) city, state
Exhibition
10/31/2013*; 7:00 pm	BYU-Hawaiʻi	W 101–85		Stan Sheriff Center (N/A); Honolulu, HI
Non-conference games
11/08/2013*; 7:00 pm, OC Sports	Tennessee State; Outrigger Hotels Rainbow Classic	W 85–55	1–0	Stan Sheriff Center (5,720); Honolulu, HI
11/09/2013*; 7:00 pm, OC Sports	Western Michigan; Outrigger Hotels Rainbow Classic	W 78–68	2–0	Stan Sheriff Center (5,861); Honolulu, HI
11/12/2013*; 12:00 am, ESPN2	New Mexico State; Outrigger Hotels Rainbow Classic	L 88–95	2–1	Stan Sheriff Center (5,495); Honolulu, HI
11/16/2013*; 3:00 pm, ESPN3	vs. Missouri	L 80–92	2–2	Sprint Center (13,681); Kansas City, MO
11/21/2013*; 7:00 pm, OC Sports	UH Hilo	W 114–63	3–2	Stan Sheriff Center (4,794); Honolulu, HI
11/27/2013*; 7:00 pm, OC Sports	New Orleans	W 91–58	4–2	Stan Sheriff Center (5,078); Honolulu, HI
11/29/2013*; 7:30 pm, OC Sports	Montana	W 72–61	5–2	Stan Sheriff Center (5,740); Honolulu, HI
12/07/2013*; 5:00 pm, FSAZ	at Northern Arizona	W 76–66	6–2	Walkup Skydome (1,629); Flagstaff, AZ
12/14/2013*; 7:00 pm	vs. Chaminade	W 94–84	7–2	Kauai High School (800); Lihue, HI
12/22/2013*; 8:00 pm, ESPNU	Boise State; Diamond Head Classic first round	L 61–62	7–3	Stan Sheriff Center (8,093); Honolulu, HI
12/23/2013*; 6:30 pm, ESPNU	Saint Mary's; Diamond Head Classic Consolation round	W 76–74	8–3	Stan Sheriff Center (6,438); Honolulu, HI
12/25/2013*; 11:00 am, ESPNU	Oregon State; Diamond Head Classic 5th place game	W 79–73	9–3	Stan Sheriff Center (6,572); Honolulu, HI
12/30/2013*; 7:00 pm, OC Sports	Norfolk State	W 77–66	10–3	Stan Sheriff Center (5,635); Honolulu, HI
01/03/2014*; 7:00 pm, OC Sports	Nebraska–Omaha	W 77–73	11–3	Stan Sheriff Center (6,128); Honolulu, HI
Conference games
01/09/2014; 5:00 pm	at Cal Poly	L 65–77	11–4 (0–1)	Mott Gym (2,559); San Luis Obispo, CA
01/11/2014; 5:00 pm, ESPN3	at Cal State Northridge	L 78–79	11–5 (0–2)	Matadome (1,060); Northridge, CA
01/18/2014; 7:00 pm, OC Sports	UC Riverside	W 100–69	12–5 (1–2)	Stan Sheriff Center (7,705); Honolulu, HI
01/23/2014; 5:00 pm, OC Sports	at UC Davis	W 90–73	13–5 (2–2)	The Pavilion (2,321); Davis, CA
01/25/2014; 5:00 pm, ESPN3	at UC Irvine	W 90–86 ^{OT}	14–5 (3–2)	Bren Events Center (4,305); Irvine, CA
01/30/2014; 7:00 pm, OC Sports	Long Beach State	L 83–92	14–6 (3–3)	Stan Sheriff Center (6,201); Honolulu, HI
02/01/2014; 7:00 pm, OC Sports	Cal State Northridge	W 77–63	15–6 (4–3)	Stan Sheriff Center (6,896); Honolulu, HI
02/06/2014; 7:00 pm, OC Sports	UC Santa Barbara	L 64–75	15–7 (4–4)	Stan Sheriff Center (5,773); Honolulu, HI
02/08/2014; 7:00 pm, OC Sports	Cal Poly	W 69–60	16–7 (5–4)	Stan Sheriff Center (7,308); Honolulu, HI
02/13/2014; 5:00 pm, OC Sports	at UC Riverside	W 87–76	17–7 (6–4)	UC Riverside Student Recreation Center (1,074); Riverside, CA
02/15/2014; 4:00 pm, ESPN3	at Cal State Fullerton	W 83–80	18–7 (7–4)	Titan Gym (3,017); Fullerton, CA
02/20/2014; 7:00 pm, OC Sports	UC Irvine	L 56–60 ^{OT}	18–8 (7–5)	Stan Sheriff Center (6,493); Honolulu, HI
02/22/2014; 7:00 pm, OC Sports	UC Davis	W 86–77	19–8 (8–5)	Stan Sheriff Center (7,297); Honolulu, HI
02/27/2014; 5:30 pm, Prime Ticket	at Long Beach State	L 61–63	19–9 (8–6)	Walter Pyramid (3,663); Long Beach, CA
03/06/2014; 5:00 pm	at UC Santa Barbara	L 77–86	19–10 (8–7)	The Thunderdome (4,019); Santa Barbara, CA
03/08/2014; 7:00 pm, OC Sports	Cal State Fullerton	W 81–77	20–10 (9–7)	Stan Sheriff Center (8,688); Honolulu, HI
Big West tournament
03/13/2014; 6:30 pm	vs. Cal State Northridge; Quarterfinals	L 84–87 ^{OT}	20–11	Honda Center (3,693); Anaheim, CA
*Non-conference game. ^{#}Rankings from AP Poll. (#) Tournament seedings in parentheses. All times are in Hawaii–Aleutian.
