= 2013–14 Cal State Northridge Matadors men's basketball team =

American college basketball season

2013–14 Cal State Northridge Matadors men's basketball
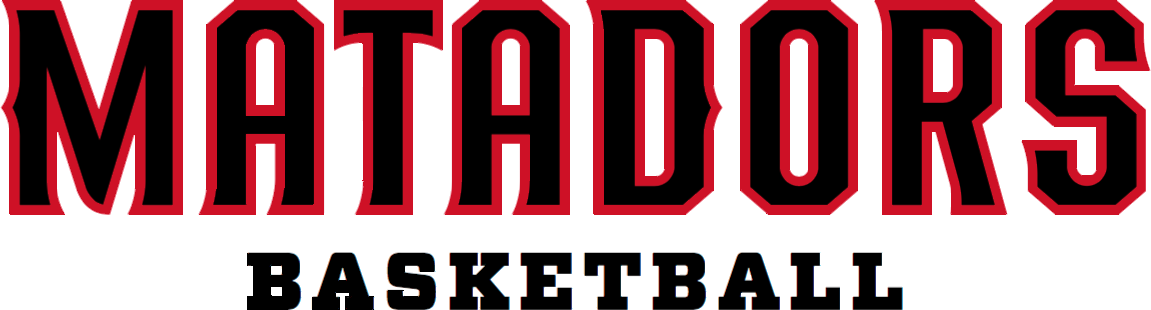
- Conference: Big West Conference
- Record: 17–18 (7–9 Big West)
- Head coach: Reggie Theus (1st season)
- Assistant coaches: Chris Pompey; Jason Levy; Jay Morris
- Home arena: Matadome

2013–14 Big West men's basketball standings
	Conf.				Overall
Team	W		L	PCT	W		L	PCT
UC Irvine	13	–	3	.813	23	–	12	.657
UC Santa Barbara	12	–	4	.750	21	–	9	.700
Long Beach State	10	–	6	.625	15	–	17	.469
Hawai'i	9	–	7	.563	20	–	11	.645
Cal State Northridge	7	–	9	.438	17	–	18	.486
Cal Poly †	6	–	10	.375	14	–	20	.412
Cal State Fullerton	6	–	10	.375	11	–	20	.355
UC Riverside	5	–	11	.313	10	–	21	.323
UC Davis	4	–	12	.250	9	–	22	.290
† 2014 Big West tournament winner

The 2013–14 Cal State Northridge Matadors men's basketball team represented California State University, Northridge during the 2013–14 NCAA Division I men's basketball season. The Matadors, led by first year head coach Reggie Theus, played their home games at the Matadome as members of the Big West Conference. They finished the season 17–18, 7–9 in Big West play to finish in fifth place. They advanced to the championship game of the Big West Conference tournament where they lost to Cal Poly.

== Season ==
=== Preseason ===
Former NBA star Reggie Theus was named the Matadors' fifth ever head coach on April 3, 2013, succeeding the fired Bobby Braswell. Theus coached the New Mexico State Aggies from 2005 to 2007, and was working as the head coach of the Los Angeles D-Fenders of the NBA Development League in 2012–13. Theus had a 41–23 record in two season with the Aggies, making one NCAA Tournament appearance in 2007.

Theus announced the team's complete schedule on August 21, 2013. The Matadors' schedule was highlighted by a trip to play USC, and also included road games at Fresno State and Stephen F. Austin, as well as home games against Southern Utah and Idaho. The Matadors also scheduled to play in the Central Michigan Tournament, hosted by Central Michigan University. Northridge's conference slate included one home game and one away game against each of the nine other members of the Big West Conference.

On November 1, the Matadors opened their season with an exhibition victory over Cal State Los Angeles, winning 82–67. Josh Greene led Cal State Northridge in scoring in the victory.

== Roster ==
2013–14 Cal State Northridge Matadors men's basketball team
Players
Coaches

Pos.	#	Name	Height	Weight	Year	Previous school	Hometown
G	0	Josh Greene	6 ft 0 in (1.83 m)	180 lb (82 kg)	Sr	Community Charter HS	Los Angeles, CA
G	2	Landon Drew	6 ft 1 in (1.85 m)	175 lb (79 kg)	So	Fairfax HS	Los Angeles, CA
G/F	3	Stephan Hicks	6 ft 6 in (1.98 m)	200 lb (91 kg)	RS Jr	National College Prep	Thousand Oaks, CA
F	5	J. J. Thomas	6 ft 6 in (1.98 m)	220 lb (100 kg)	Jr	Scotlandville HS; Louisiana–Lafayette	Opelousas, LA
F	10	Trevone Williams	6 ft 6 in (1.98 m)	225 lb (102 kg)	RS So	Westchester HS	Los Angeles, CA
G	11	Ben Vozzola	6 ft 5 in (1.96 m)	190 lb (86 kg)	Jr	Centennial High School; San Diego; Cowley County CC	Las Vegas, NV
G	14	Aaron Parks	6 ft 3 in (1.91 m)	198 lb (90 kg)	Fr	Lake Clifton HS	Baltimore, MD
C	15	Dominique Youmans	6 ft 10 in (2.08 m)	230 lb (104 kg)	Sr	Apex Academy; Snow College; South Carolina State	Philadelphia, PA
G	20	KJ Smith	6 ft 2 in (1.88 m)	165 lb (75 kg)	So	Campbell Hall HS; Jackson State	Los Angeles, CA
F	21	Stephen Maxwell	6 ft 7 in (2.01 m)	220 lb (100 kg)	Jr	Taft HS	Woodland Hills, CA
G	22	Amir Garrett (I) (redshirt)	6 ft 6 in (1.98 m)	220 lb (100 kg)	RS Jr	Findlay Prep; St. John's	Los Angeles, CA
C	32	Kevin Johnson	6 ft 10 in (2.08 m)	240 lb (109 kg)	RS So	Taft HS; Seton Hall	Los Angeles, CA
F	33	Devonte Elliott	6 ft 10 in (2.08 m)	220 lb (100 kg)	Sr	Paramount HS; Nevada	Paramount, CA
F/C	35	Tre Hale-Edmerson	6 ft 9 in (2.06 m)	215 lb (98 kg)	So	Stoneridge Prep	Sheridan, OR
G	12	Robert Cid	5 ft 10 in (1.78 m)	160 lb (73 kg)	Jr	Dos Pueblos	Santa Barbara, CA

Head coach

- Reggie Theus (UNLV)

Assistant coach(es)

- Chris Pompey (Pittsburgh)
- Jason Levy (Cal State Northridge)
- Jay Morris (Cal State Dominguez Hills)

Legend

- (C) Team captain
- (S) Suspended
- (I) Ineligible
- (W) Walk-on
- Injured
- Current redshirt

== Schedule and results ==
Date time, TV	Opponent	Result	Record	Site (attendance) city, state
Exhibition
11/01/2013*; 7:05 pm	Cal State LA	W 82–67		Matadome (N/A); Northridge, CA
Regular season
11/08/2013*; 7:05 pm	Hope International	W 86–74	1–0	Matadome (520); Northridge, CA
11/12/2013*; 8:00 pm, P12N	at USC	L 79–95	1–1	Galen Center (4,116); Los Angeles, CA
11/16/2013*; 7:00 pm	at Fresno State	L 64–80	1–2	Save Mart Center (14,770); Fresno, CA
11/21/2013*; 2:30 pm	vs. Montana State; Central Michigan Tournament	W 74–73	2–2	McGuirk Arena (1,252); Mount Pleasant, MI
11/22/2013*; 1:30 pm	vs. Austin Peay; Central Michigan Tournament	W 80–77 ^{OT}	3–2	McGuirk Arena (1,539); Mount Pleasant, MI
11/23/2013*; 4:30 pm	at Central Michigan; Central Michigan Tournament	L 76–90	3–3	McGuirk Arena (1,575); Mount Pleasant, MI
11/26/2013*; 6:05 pm	at Montana State	L 62–77	3–4	Brick Breeden Fieldhouse (1,945); Bozeman, MT
12/01/2013*; 2:00 pm	La Sierra	W 97–79	4–4	Matadome (195); Northridge, CA
12/03/2013*; 7:05 pm	Southern Utah	W 84–57	5–4	Matadome (339); Northridge, CA
12/05/2013*; 7:05 pm	Seattle	L 53–58	5–5	Matadome (551); Northridge, CA
12/20/2013*; 5:00 pm	at Texas A&M–Corpus Christi	W 67–66	6–5	Dugan Wellness Center (N/A); Corpus Christi, TX
12/22/2013*; 7:05 pm	Idaho	W 79–69	7–5	Matadome (550); Northridge, CA
12/27/2013*; 7:05 pm	Morgan State	W 86–80	8–5	Matadome (430); Northridge, CA
12/30/2013*; 6:00 pm	at Stephen F. Austin	L 67–75	8–6	William R. Johnson Coliseum (674); Nacogdoches, TX
01/02/2014*; 5:00 pm	at South Dakota	L 75–76	8–7	DakotaDome (1,215); Vermillion, SD
01/09/2014; 7:05 pm, ESPN3	UC Davis	W 89–77	9–7 (1–0)	Matadome (630); Northridge, CA
01/11/2014; 7:00 pm, ESPN3	Hawaiʻi	W 79–78	10–7 (2–0)	Matadome (1,060); Northridge, CA
01/16/2014; 7:00 pm	at Cal Poly	L 52–62	10–8 (2–1)	Mott Gym (2,248); San Luis Obispo, CA
01/18/2014; 7:00 pm, Prime Ticket	UC Santa Barbara	L 69–79	10–9 (2–2)	Matadome (1,301); Northridge, CA
01/23/2014; 7:00 pm	at UC Irvine	L 66–72	10–10 (2–3)	Bren Events Center (1,506); Irvine, CA
01/25/2014; 4:00 pm	at Long Beach State	L 62–76	10–11 (2–4)	Walter Pyramid (3,179); Long Beach, CA
01/30/2014; 7:05 pm, ESPN3	UC Riverside	W 93–89 ^{OT}	11–11 (3–4)	Matadome (1,287); Northridge, CA
02/01/2014; 9:00 pm, OC Sports	at Hawaiʻi	L 63–77	11–12 (3–5)	Stan Sheriff Center (6,896); Honolulu, HI
02/06/2014; 7:00 pm, ESPN3	at UC Davis	L 86–90 ^{OT}	11–13 (3–6)	The Pavilion (1,637); Davis, CA
02/08/2014; 7:00 pm	Cal State Fullerton	W 92–83 ^{OT}	12–13 (4–6)	Matadome (1,227); Northridge, CA
02/13/2014; 7:05 pm	Cal Poly	L 55–62	12–14 (4–7)	Matadome (1,083); Northridge, CA
02/15/2014; 4:00 pm	at UC Santa Barbara	W 80–78 ^{OT}	13–14 (5–7)	UC Santa Barbara Events Center (2,687); Santa Barbara, CA
02/18/2014*; 7:00 pm	at Idaho	L 88–96	13–15	Cowan Spectrum (1,067); Moscow, ID
02/22/2014; 7:30 pm, Prime Ticket	UC Irvine	W 81–75 ^{OT}	14–15 (6–7)	Matadome (1,321); Northridge, CA
02/27/2014; 7:00 pm	at Cal State Fullerton	L 81–82	14–16 (6–8)	Titan Gym (747); Fullerton, CA
03/01/2014; 7:00 pm, ESPN3	at UC Riverside	L 105–106 ^{2OT}	14–17 (6–9)	UC Riverside Student Recreation Center (663); Riverside, CA
03/06/2014; 7:05 pm, ESPN3	Long Beach State	W 91–83	15–17 (7–9)	Matadome (1,585); Northridge, CA
Big West tournament
03/13/2014; 8:30 pm	vs. Hawaiʻi; Quarterfinals	W 87–84 ^{OT}	16–17	Honda Center (3,693); Anaheim, CA
03/14/2014; 9:00 pm, ESPNU	vs. Long Beach State; Semifinals	W 82–77	17–17	Honda Center (4,589); Anaheim, CA
03/15/2014; 7:30 pm, ESPN2	vs. Cal Poly; Championship	L 59–61	17–18	Honda Center (3,626); Anaheim, CA
*Non-conference game. ^{#}Rankings from AP Poll. (#) Tournament seedings in parentheses. All times are in Pacific Time.
