= 2013–14 Long Beach State 49ers men's basketball team =

American college basketball season

2013–14 Long Beach State 49ers men's basketball
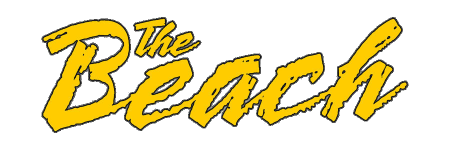
- Conference: Big West Conference
- Record: 15–17 (10–6 Big West)
- Head coach: Dan Monson (7th season)
- Assistant coaches: Vic Couch; Eric Brown; Rod Palmer
- Home arena: Walter Pyramid

2013–14 Big West men's basketball standings
	Conf.				Overall
Team	W		L	PCT	W		L	PCT
UC Irvine	13	–	3	.813	23	–	12	.657
UC Santa Barbara	12	–	4	.750	21	–	9	.700
Long Beach State	10	–	6	.625	15	–	17	.469
Hawai'i	9	–	7	.563	20	–	11	.645
Cal State Northridge	7	–	9	.438	17	–	18	.486
Cal Poly †	6	–	10	.375	14	–	20	.412
Cal State Fullerton	6	–	10	.375	11	–	20	.355
UC Riverside	5	–	11	.313	10	–	21	.323
UC Davis	4	–	12	.250	9	–	22	.290
† 2014 Big West tournament winner

The 2013–14 Long Beach State 49ers men's basketball team represented California State University, Long Beach during the 2013–14 NCAA Division I men's basketball season. The 49ers were led by seventh year head coach Dan Monson and played their home games at Walter Pyramid and were members of the Big West Conference. They finished the season 15–17, 10–6 in Big West play to finish in third place. They advanced to the semifinals of the Big West Conference tournament where they lost to Cal State Northridge.

== Roster ==
Number	Name	Position	Height	Weight	Year	Hometown
1	Tyler Lamb	Guard	6–5	205	Junior	Santa Ana, California
2	Kriss Gulley	Guard/Forward	6–7	175	Junior	Dallas, Texas
3	Anson Moye	Guard	6–0	175	Freshman	Thousand Oaks, California
5	Mike Caffey	Guard	6–0	175	Junior	Corona, California
11	David Samuels	Forward	6–7	225	Senior	Bronx, New York
12	Edgar Garibay	Forward	6–11	250	Senior	Compton, California
14	Branford Jones	Guard	6–1	185	Freshman	Missouri City, Texas
15	A.J. Spencer	Guard	6–3	200	Junior	Shawnee, Kansas
20	Desmond Ross	Guard	6–3	190	Freshman	Mesa, Arizona
21	Christian Griggs-Williams	Forward	6–7	260	Junior	Milwaukee, Wisconsin
22	Javion Watson	Guard	6–2	190	Freshman	San Diego, California
31	McKay LaSalle	Guard	6-3	190	Junior	Bountiful, Utah
33	Nick Shepherd	Forward	6–9	220	Junior	Missouri City, Texas
34	Kyle Richardson	Forward	6–6	235	Junior	Lakewood, California
35	Dan Jennings	Forward	6–9	245	Senior	Staten Island, New York

== Schedule ==
Date time, TV	Opponent	Result	Record	Site (attendance) city, state
Regular season
11/09/2013*; 3:00 pm	Hawaiʻi Pacific	W 71–59	1–0	Walter Pyramid (4,513); Long Beach, CA
11/11/2013*; 7:00 pm, P12N	at No. 6 Arizona	L 57–91	1–1	McKale Center (14,087); Tucson, AZ
11/14/2013*; 7:00 pm	Loyola Marymount	L 73–74	1–2	Walter Pyramid (3,250); Long Beach, CA
11/17/2013*; 11:00 am, FSKC	at Kansas State	L 58–71	1–3	Bramlage Coliseum (12,003); Manhattan, KS
11/21/2013*; 2:00 pm, ESPN2	vs. No. 14 Michigan; Puerto Rico Tip-Off First Round	L 61–85	1–4	Roberto Clemente Coliseum (4,952); San Juan, PR
11/22/2013*; 7:30 pm, ESPNU	vs. No. 10 VCU; Puerto Rico Tip-Off Consolation 2nd round	L 67–73	1–5	Roberto Clemente Coliseum (5,835); San Juan, PR
11/24/2013*; 11:30 am, ESPN3	vs. Kansas State; Puerto Rico Tip-Off 7th place game	L 38–52	1–6	Roberto Clemente Coliseum (N/A); San Juan, PR
11/30/2013*; 3:30 pm, P12N	at Washington	L 89–92 ^{2OT}	1–7	Hec Edmundson Pavilion (6,032); Seattle, WA
12/03/2013*; 7:00 pm	Creighton	L 61–78	1–8	Walter Pyramid (3,481); Long Beach, CA
12/07/2013*; 11:00 am, RSN	at NC State	L 66–76	1–9	PNC Arena (10,616); Raleigh, NC
12/19/2013*; 7:00 pm, Prime Ticket	USC	W 72–71	2–9	Walter Pyramid (4,410); Long Beach, CA
12/21/2013*; 12:00 pm	Montana State-Billings	W 82–75	3–9	Walter Pyramid (1,960); Long Beach, CA
12/28/2013*; 7:00 pm	at Nevada	W 80–77 ^{OT}	4–9	Lawlor Events Center (7,141); Reno, NV
01/04/2014*; 2:00 pm, FSN	at No. 25 Missouri	L 59–69	4–10	Mizzou Arena (8,679); Columbia, MO
01/09/2014; 8:00 pm, Prime Ticket	UC Irvine	L 44–46	4–11 (0–1)	Walter Pyramid (2,817); Long Beach, CA
01/11/2014; 4:00 pm	UC Davis	W 99–74	5–11 (1–1)	Walter Pyramid (2,119); Long Beach, CA
01/16/2014; 8:00 pm, ESPNU	at UC Santa Barbara	L 51–64	5–12 (1–2)	The Thunderdome (3,556); Santa Barbara, CA
01/18/2014; 7:00 pm	at Cal Poly	W 63–62	6–12 (2–2)	Mott Gym (2,924); San Luis Obispo, CA
01/25/2014; 4:00 pm	Cal State Northridge	W 76–62	7–12 (3–2)	Walter Pyramid (3,179); Long Beach, CA
01/30/2014; 9:00 pm	at Hawaiʻi	W 92–83	8–12 (4–2)	Stan Sheriff Center (6,201); Honolulu, HI
02/01/2014; 4:00 pm, ESPN3	Cal State Fullerton	W 75–56	9–12 (5–2)	Walter Pyramid (3,762); Long Beach, CA
02/06/2014; 7:30 pm, Prime Ticket	at UC Irvine	L 58–61	9–13 (5–3)	Bren Events Center (2,979); Irvine, CA
02/08/2014; 7:00 pm, ESPN3	at UC Riverside	W 88–76	10–13 (6–3)	UC Riverside Student Recreation Center (1,064); Riverside, CA
02/13/2014; 7:00 pm, ESPN3	UC Santa Barbara	L 64–65	10–14 (6–4)	Walter Pyramid (3,269); Long Beach, CA
02/15/2014; 7:00 pm, Prime Ticket	Cal Poly	W 74–65	11–14 (7–4)	Walter Pyramid (2,422); Long Beach, CA
02/20/2014; 7:00 pm	at UC Davis	W 79–57	12–14 (8–4)	The Pavilion (1,211); Davis, CA
02/27/2014; 7:30 pm, Prime Ticket	Hawaiʻi	W 63–61	13–14 (9–4)	Walter Pyramid (3,663); Long Beach, CA
03/01/2014; 6:00 pm, ESPN3	at Cal State Fullerton	L 76–84	13–15 (9–5)	Titan Gym (1,806); Fullerton, CA
03/06/2014; 7:00 pm	at Cal State Northridge	L 83–91	13–16 (9–6)	Matadome (1,585); Northridge, CA
03/08/2014; 4:00 pm, ESPN3	UC Riverside	W 74–67	14–16 (10–6)	Walter Pyramid (2,151); Long Beach, CA
Big West tournament
03/13/2014; 2:30 pm, Prime Ticket	vs. Cal State Fullerton; Quarterfinals	W 66–56	15–16	Honda Center (N/A); Anaheim, CA
03/14/2014; 9:00 pm, ESPNU	vs. Cal State Northridge; Semifinals	L 77–82	15–17	Honda Center (4,589); Anaheim, CA
*Non-conference game. ^{#}Rankings from AP Poll. (#) Tournament seedings in parentheses. All times are in Pacific Time.
