= Dennis Cutts =

American basketball coach

Personal information
- Born: April 11, 1968 (age 58) Massapequa, New York, U.S.

Career information
- College: Albany (1986–1990)
- Coaching career: 1991–present

Career history

Coaching
- 1991–1994: Pima CC (assistant)
- 1994–1996: Northland Pioneer CC (assistant)
- 1996–1999: Stephen F. Austin (assistant)
- 1999–2002: Northern Arizona (assistant)
- 2002–2005: San Jose State (assistant)
- 2007–2013: UC Riverside (assistant)
- 2013–2018: UC Riverside
- 2019–2022: Wisconsin Herd (assistant)
- 2022–2023: Austin Spurs (assistant)
- 2025: Halcones de Ciudad Obregón

Career highlights
- As Assistant Coach: Big Sky Conference Tournament champion (2000)

Dennis Allen Cutts (born April 11, 1968) is an American basketball coach. He is the former men's basketball head coach for University of California, Riverside.

Cutts was announced as a part of the Wisconsin Herd coaching staff on September 24, 2019.

== Head coaching record ==
Record table
Season	Team	Overall	Conference	Standing	Postseason
UC Riverside Highlanders (Big West Conference) (2013–2018)
2013–14	UC Riverside	10–21	5–11	8th	
2014–15	UC Riverside	14–17	7–9	6th	
2015–16	UC Riverside	14–19	5–11	T–6th	
2016–17	UC Riverside	7–21	5–11	8th	
2017–18	UC Riverside	5–9			
UC Riverside:		50–87 (.365)	22–43 (.338)		
Total:		50–87 (.365)			
National champion Postseason invitational champion Conference regular season champion Conference regular season and conference tournament champion Division regular season champion Division regular season and conference tournament champion Conference tournament champion
