= 2014 Big West Conference men's basketball tournament =

- Classification: Division I
- Season: 2013–14
- Teams: 8
- Site: Honda Center; Anaheim, California
- Champions: Cal Poly (1st title)
- Winning coach: Joe Callero (1st title)
- MVP: Chris Eversley (Cal Poly)
- Television: FS PRIME; ESPN3; ESPNU; ESPN2

2013–14 Big West men's basketball standings
	Conf.				Overall
Team	W		L	PCT	W		L	PCT
UC Irvine	13	–	3	.813	23	–	12	.657
UC Santa Barbara	12	–	4	.750	21	–	9	.700
Long Beach State	10	–	6	.625	15	–	17	.469
Hawai'i	9	–	7	.563	20	–	11	.645
Cal State Northridge	7	–	9	.438	17	–	18	.486
Cal Poly †	6	–	10	.375	14	–	20	.412
Cal State Fullerton	6	–	10	.375	11	–	20	.355
UC Riverside	5	–	11	.313	10	–	21	.323
UC Davis	4	–	12	.250	9	–	22	.290
† 2014 Big West tournament winner

The 2014 Big West Conference men's basketball tournament took place March 13–15, 2014 at the Honda Center in Anaheim, California. The champion Cal Poly Mustangs received the conference's automatic bid to the 2014 NCAA Men's Division I Basketball Tournament.

== Format ==
The top eight teams qualified for the 2014 Big West tournament. In the semifinals, the highest seed played the lowest seed, while the remaining two teams matched up.

== Bracket ==
Quarterfinals; March 13, 2014; FS PRIME
1	UC Irvine	63
8	UC Riverside	43
4	Hawaiʻi	84
5	Cal State Northridge	87^{OT}
(Pairings are reseeded after the first round)
2	UC Santa Barbara	38
7	Cal Poly	69
3	Long Beach State	66
6	Cal State Fullerton	56

Semifinals; March 14, 2014; ESPNU (re-seeded)
1	UC Irvine	58
7	Cal Poly	61
3	Long Beach State	77
5	Cal State Northridge	82

Championship; March 15, 2014; ESPN2
7	Cal Poly	61
5	Cal State Northridge	59
