= 2013–14 UC Davis Aggies men's basketball team =

American college basketball season

2013–14 UC Davis Aggies men's basketball
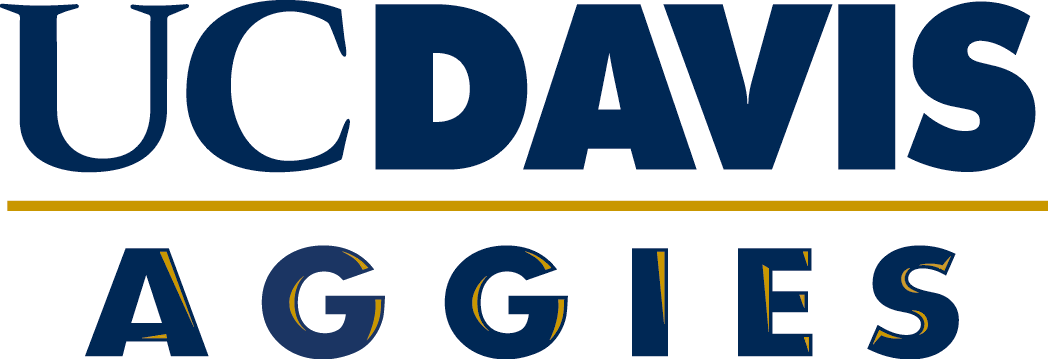
- Conference: Big West Conference
- Record: 9–22 (4–12 Big West)
- Head coach: Jim Les (3rd season)
- Assistant coaches: Kevin Nosek; Chris Davis; Kyle Vogt
- Home arena: The Pavilion

2013–14 Big West men's basketball standings
	Conf.				Overall
Team	W		L	PCT	W		L	PCT
UC Irvine	13	–	3	.813	23	–	12	.657
UC Santa Barbara	12	–	4	.750	21	–	9	.700
Long Beach State	10	–	6	.625	15	–	17	.469
Hawai'i	9	–	7	.563	20	–	11	.645
Cal State Northridge	7	–	9	.438	17	–	18	.486
Cal Poly †	6	–	10	.375	14	–	20	.412
Cal State Fullerton	6	–	10	.375	11	–	20	.355
UC Riverside	5	–	11	.313	10	–	21	.323
UC Davis	4	–	12	.250	9	–	22	.290
† 2014 Big West tournament winner

The 2013–14 UC Davis Aggies men's basketball team represented the University of California, Davis during the 2013-14 NCAA Division I men's basketball season. The Aggies, led by third-year head coach Jim Les, played their home games at The Pavilion as members of the Big West Conference. They finished the season 9–22, 4–12 in Big West play, to finish in last place. They failed to qualify for the Big West Conference tournament.

== Season ==
=== Preseason ===
Coach Jim Les wrapped up his 2013 recruiting class on May 8, 2013, with the announcement that forward Georgi Funtarov had chosen the Aggies and had signed his National Letter of Intent. Funtarov, who played for Vermont Academy in Saxtons River, Vermont, was rated a two-star recruit by ESPN, and joined San Diego prep player of the year and All-California team selection Brynton Lemar as the second member of UC Davis's recruiting class. Lemar was rated a three-star prospect by ESPN.

The Aggies announced their 2013–14 season schedule on July 30, 2013. Key games on UC Davis's schedule included trips to play Pac-12 Conference members Utah and Stanford, as well as hosting Mountain West Conference member Nevada and traveling to play first-year MWC member San Jose State. The Aggies also scheduled to play with Portland State and two other undetermined teams in the Portland State tournament in Portland, Oregon. The Aggies' 16-game conference schedule included home-and-away dates against each of the eight other members of the Big West Conference.

On August 16, 2013, Les announced that junior forward J.T. Adenrele suffered a season-ending left knee injury during a non-contact drill and would miss the entire season. Les announced that Adenrele would be redshirted for the season to preserve his eligibility. Adenrele averaged 12.6 points, 5.9 rebounds, and 1.5 blocks per game while starting all 31 games in 2012–13.

== Roster ==
2013–14 UC Davis Aggies men's basketball team
Players
Coaches

Pos.	#	Name	Height	Weight	Year	Previous school	Hometown
G	0	Brynton Lemar	6 ft 4 in (1.93 m)	192 lb (87 kg)	Fr	St. Augustine HS	San Diego, CA
F	1	Iggy Nujic	6 ft 8 in (2.03 m)	215 lb (98 kg)	Jr	Australian Institute of Sport; UTSA	Perth, Australia
G	2	Darius Graham	5 ft 10 in (1.78 m)	180 lb (82 kg)	RS Fr	Sacramento HS	Sacramento, CA
G	3	Corey Hawkins	6 ft 3 in (1.91 m)	195 lb (88 kg)	Jr	Estrella HS; Arizona State	Goodyear, AZ
G	11	Olivier-Paul Betu	6 ft 2 in (1.88 m)	175 lb (79 kg)	So	Worcester Academy	Montreal, Canada
F	12	Georgia Funtarov	6 ft 8 in (2.03 m)	205 lb (93 kg)	Fr	Vermont Academy	Sofia, Bulgaria
F	13	J. T. Adenrele (injured)	6 ft 7 in (2.01 m)	225 lb (102 kg)	Jr	Oakmont HS	Roseville, CA
G	15	Tyler Les	6 ft 2 in (1.88 m)	185 lb (84 kg)	Sr	Notre Dame HS	Peoria, IL
G	20	Avery Johnson	6 ft 3 in (1.91 m)	180 lb (82 kg)	Jr	Ocean View HS; San Francisco	Long Beach, CA
F	23	Josh Ritchart	6 ft 9 in (2.06 m)	235 lb (107 kg)	Sr	Forest Lake Christian HS	Auburn, CA
G	25	Ryan Sypkens	6 ft 4 in (1.93 m)	195 lb (88 kg)	Sr	Franklin HS	Elk Grove, CA
G	31	Carlos Mancasola	6 ft 2 in (1.88 m)	165 lb (75 kg)	Fr	Homeschooled	Redding, CA
F	33	Clint Bozner	6 ft 8 in (2.03 m)	250 lb (113 kg)	Jr	Villa Park HS; L.A. Trade–Tech	Corona, CA
C	40	Spencer Clayton	6 ft 10 in (2.08 m)	230 lb (104 kg)	Sr	Camas HS; Mt. Hood CC	Gresham, OR

Head coach

- Jim Les (Bradley)

Assistant coach(es)

- Kevin Nosek (UC Davis)
- Chris Davis (Michigan)
- Kyle Vogt (Lakeland)

Legend

- (C) Team captain
- (S) Suspended
- (I) Ineligible
- (W) Walk-on
- Injured
- Current redshirt

== Schedule ==
Date time, TV	Opponent	Result	Record	Site (attendance) city, state
Exhibition
11/04/2013*; 7:00 pm	Menlo	W 81–53	–	The Pavilion (707); Davis, CA
Non-conference games
11/08/2013*; 7:30 pm	at Portland	L 83–100	0–1	Chiles Center (1,329); Portland, OR
11/11/2013*; 7:00 pm	Holy Names	W 80–54	1–1	The Pavilion (637); Davis, CA
11/15/2013*; 7:00 pm, P12N	at Utah	L 60–97	1–2	Jon M. Huntsman Center (10,685); Salt Lake City, UT
11/22/2013*; 3:00 pm	vs. SIU Edwardsville; Portland State Tournament	W 80–75	2–2	Stott Center (755); Portland, OR
11/23/2013*; 3:00 pm	vs. Loyola; Portland State Tournament	W 64–61 ^{OT}	3–2	Stott Center (834); Portland, OR
11/24/2013*; 3:00 pm	at Portland State; Portland State Tournament	L 63–79	3–3	Stott Center (738); Portland, OR
11/26/2013*; 7:00 pm	Sacramento State	L 67–73	3–4	The Pavilion (2,465); Davis, CA
11/30/2013*; 2:00 pm	Idaho	L 76–80	3–5	The Pavilion (627); Davis, CA
12/02/2013*; 7:05 pm	at Seattle	L 53–77	3–6	KeyArena (844); Seattle, WA
12/07/2013*; 7:00 pm	Nevada	L 81–87 ^{OT}	3–7	The Pavilion (2,422); Davis, CA
12/14/2013*; 5:00 pm, P12N	at Stanford	L 56–83	3–8	Maples Pavilion (4,045); Stanford, CA
12/18/2013*; 8:00 pm	at San Jose State	L 85–89 ^{3OT}	3–9	Event Center Arena (1,229); San Jose, CA
12/21/2013*; 2:30 pm	Air Force	W 80–74	4–9	The Pavilion (802); Davis, CA
12/30/2013*; 7:00 pm	Furman	L 65–75	4–10	The Pavilion (631); Davis, CA
01/02/2014*; 7:00 pm	Simpson	W 93–69	5–10	The Pavilion (677); Davis, CA
Conference Games
01/09/2014; 7:05 pm, ESPN3	at Cal State Northridge	L 77–89	5–11 (0–1)	Matadome (630); Northridge, CA
01/11/2014; 4:00 pm	at Long Beach State	L 74–99	5–12 (0–2)	Walter Pyramid (2,119); Long Beach, CA
01/16/2014; 7:00 pm	UC Riverside	L 69–81	5–13 (0–3)	The Pavilion (2,013); Davis, CA
01/18/2014; 7:00 pm	Cal State Fullerton	W 69–61	6–13 (1–3)	The Pavilion (2,216); Davis, CA
01/23/2014; 7:00 pm	Hawaii	L 73–90	6–14 (1–4)	The Pavilion (2,321); Davis, CA
01/30/2014; 7:00 pm	at Cal Poly	W 62–58	7–14 (2–4)	Mott Gym (2,242); San Luis Obispo, CA
02/01/2014; 4:00 pm	at UC Santa Barbara	L 67–82	7–15 (2–5)	UC Santa Barbara Events Center (2,509); Santa Barbara, CA
02/06/2014; 7:00 pm	Cal State Northridge	W 90–86 ^{OT}	8–15 (3–5)	The Pavilion (1,637); Davis, CA
02/08/2014; 7:00 pm	UC Irvine	L 59–61	8–16 (3–6)	The Pavilion (1,598); Davis, CA
02/13/2014; 7:00 pm	at Cal State Fullerton	L 64–74	8–17 (3–7)	Titan Gym (731); Fullerton, CA
02/20/2014; 7:00 pm	Long Beach State	L 57–79	8–18 (3–8)	The Pavilion (1,211); Davis, CA
02/22/2014; 9:00 pm, OC Sports	at Hawaii	L 77–86	8–19 (3–9)	Stan Sheriff Center (7,297); Honolulu, HI
02/27/2014; 7:00 pm	Cal Poly	W 85–73	9–19 (4–9)	The Pavilion (1,190); Davis, CA
03/01/2014; 7:00 pm, ESPN2	UC Santa Barbara	L 54–67	9–20 (4–10)	The Pavilion (5,227); Davis, CA
03/06/2014; 7:00 pm	at UC Riverside	L 65–78	9–21 (4–11)	UC Riverside Student Recreation Center (1,485); Riverside, CA
03/08/2014; 7:00 pm, Prime Ticket	at UC Irvine	L 46–74	9–22 (4–12)	Bren Events Center (2,252); Irvine, CA
*Non-conference game. ^{#}Rankings from AP poll. (#) Tournament seedings in parentheses. All times are in Pacific Time.
