= Chris Eversley =

American basketball player (born 1991)

No. 33 – Westports Malaysia Dragons
- Position: Small forward
- League: ASEAN Basketball League

Personal information
- Born: September 26, 1991 (age 35) Chicago, Illinois
- Listed height: 6 ft 7 in (2.01 m)
- Listed weight: 225 lb (102 kg)

Career information
- High school: Payton College Prep (Chicago, Illinois)
- College: Rice (2009–2010); Cal Poly (2011–2014)
- NBA draft: 2014: undrafted
- Playing career: 2014–present

Career history
- 2014: Westports Malaysia Dragons
- 2015–2016: Kangoeroes Willebroek
- 2016–2017: RheinStars Köln
- 2018–present: Westports Malaysia Dragons

Career highlights
- First-team All-Big West (2013); Second-team All-Big West (2014); Big West tournament MVP (2014)

Chris Eversley (born September 26, 1991) is an American professional basketball player for the Westports Malaysia Dragons of the ASEAN Basketball League. He was not selected in the 2014 NBA draft prior to his international career. Eversley generally plays the small forward position on the court.

He played with the Cal Poly Mustangs men's basketball team throughout his college years and became the first athlete from Walter Payton College Prep to sign a National Letter of Intent with a men's basketball program in the NCAA Division I. Eversley previously played basketball at the collegiate level with the Rice Owls, but transferred after completing his freshman season. Some of his most prestigious honors through his years with Cal Poly include being named to the All-Big West First Team as a junior, and All-Big West Second Team in his final season. He was also a great contributor in the Mustangs' unanticipated run in the Big West championship, and was named the tournament's most valuable player after scoring eighteen points in the final game against Cal State Northridge. Eversley was considered to be the catalyst behind their 2014 NCAA Men's Division I Basketball Tournament appearance.

== Collegiate career ==
On, March 15, 2014, Cal Poly won its first ever Big West championship over CSU Northridge 61–59. Eversley was named the game's MVP with 18 points. By the end of his college years at Cal Poly, Eversley stood 12th on the program's all-time scoring list with 1,192 points total. He also ranked ninth under the rebounding category.

On the night of February 1, 2014, Eversley completed a dunk during a game against UC Irvine at Mott Athletics Center which was shown later that evening on ESPN's "SportsCenter" as the No. 3 play of the day across the country in the daily 'Top 10' segment.

== Professional career ==
Following Cal Poly's tournament defeat to Wichita State, Eversley took part in a nine-game, two-week tour through China with the United States Basketball Academy.

Eversley signed with the Westports Malaysia Dragons of the ASEAN Basketball League (ABL) shortly after being undrafted through the 2014 NBA draft. The decision made him only the ninth Mustang to compete with a professional team after being coached by Joe Callero.

He made his professional debut on July 16, 2014, against HiTech Bangkok City, scoring 31 points total. His first game helped him become the league's top scorer for the time period. Eversley also recorded 13 rebounds, helping him gain league attention. Despite his electric performance, the Dragons started the season out with a loss.

On August 31, 2016, he signed with the Rhein Stars Koln, a Pro A club in the German Bundesliga.

In 2018, Eversly returned to the Westports Malaysia Dragons.
