= Gib Arnold =

American basketball player-coach

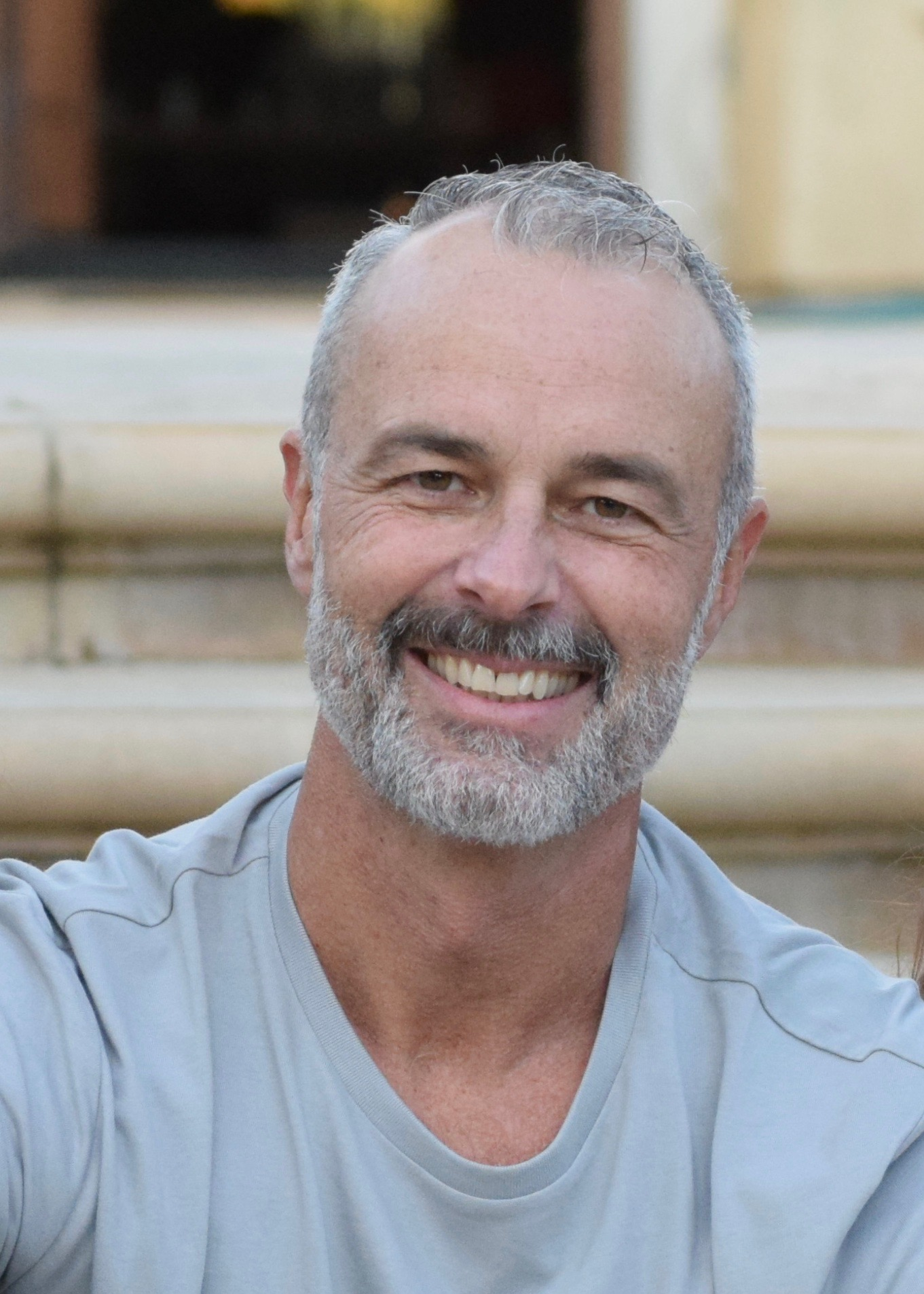
- Arnold in 2019

Biographical details
- Born: October 19, 1968 (age 57); Eugene, Oregon, U.S.

Playing career
- 1987–1988: Arizona State
- 1991–1992: UC San Diego
- Position: Guard

Coaching career (HC unless noted)
- 1994–1995: Provo HS (asst.)
- 1995–1996: Utah Valley (asst.)
- 1996–1998: Loyola Marymount (asst.)
- 1998–1999: Vanderbilt (asst.)
- 1999–2003: Pepperdine (asst.)
- 2003–2005: College of Southern Idaho
- 2005–2010: USC (asst.)
- 2010–2014: Hawaii

Administrative career (AD unless noted)
- 2015–2020: Boston Celtics (scout)

Head coaching record
- Overall: 72–55 (.567) (NCAA); 57–14 (.803) (junior college)
- Tournaments: 1–2 (CIT)

Gibson Kirk Arnold (born October 19, 1968) is an American college basketball player and coach.

== Early life and education ==
Arnold was born in 1968, when his father Frank Arnold was an assistant coach at the University of Oregon. As Frank Arnold later became an assistant at UCLA and was head coach at BYU and Hawaii, Gib Arnold grew up in the Los Angeles, Provo, Utah, and Honolulu, Hawaii areas.

Arnold graduated from Punahou School in 1987, where he was a prep All-American and Hawaii's high school Gatorade Player of the Year. Initially committed to Hawaii, Arnold first attended Arizona State University instead to follow his father, who became assistant coach for the Arizona State Sun Devils. An honor student as a freshman, Arnold left Arizona State to go on a two-year LDS mission to Munich, Germany.

In 1990, Arnold enrolled in Dixie State College, a junior college in St. George, Utah and played his first year of college basketball there. Arnold transferred to UC San Diego in 1991, averaging 3.6 points in 20 games as a sophomore. Retiring from basketball, Arnold transferred to Brigham Young University and graduated in 1994 with a bachelor's degree in business administration. Gib later completed his master's degree in clinical psychology, at Harvard University, in Cambridge.

== Coaching career ==
=== Assistant Coaching and Junior College (1994–2010) ===
Arnold began his coaching career as an assistant coach at Provo High School in 1994. He moved to Utah Valley State College (now Utah Valley University) as an assistant in 1995–96, followed by assistant coaching positions at Loyola Marymount (1996–97), Vanderbilt (1998–99), and Pepperdine (1999–2003). At Pepperdine, Arnold specialized in recruiting and coaching defense.

From 2003 to 2005, Arnold served as head coach at the College of Southern Idaho (CSI), leading his teams to a 57–14 record, back-to-back Scenic West Athletic Conference championships, and a third-place finish in the Junior College National Championships in 2005. He was named Region 18 Coach of the Year twice.

Arnold then joined USC as an assistant coach under Tim Floyd and later Kevin O’Neill (2005–2010), where he was recognized as one of the nation’s top recruiters. He helped recruit several future NBA players, including DeMar DeRozan, Taj Gibson, O. J. Mayo, and Nikola Vucevic.

=== University of Hawaii (2010–2014) ===
In March 2010, Arnold was named head coach of the University of Hawaii basketball program. He inherited a team with three consecutive losing seasons and led them to a 19–13 record and a CollegeInsider.com Tournament (CIT) appearance in his first season. Under Arnold, Hawaii recorded its first 20-win season in over a decade in 2013–14, finishing 20–11. He became the fastest coach in Hawaii history to reach 50 wins and the only full-time coach in his tenure to avoid a losing season. His teams were also academically successful, achieving the highest team GPA in school history and perfect APR scores on multiple occasions.

In October 2014, Arnold was fired amid an NCAA investigation related to alleged Level I and II violations. The NCAA later cleared Arnold of any Level I violations and determined he had no knowledge of the infractions. Arnold reached a $700,000 settlement with the university for wrongful termination.

=== NBA Front Office and Mental Performance Work (2015–Present) ===
Arnold spent five seasons in the Boston Celtics front office, assisting in player acquisitions and contributing to the development of the team that would win the 2024 NBA Championship, including the drafting of Jayson Tatum, Jaylen Brown, and Payton Pritchard.

Recognizing the growing importance of mental strength and emotional well-being for athletes, Arnold earned a master's degree in psychology from Harvard University and founded MindBodySoul Sports Psychology & Performance in 2020. Through this work, he has coached NBA All-Stars, Olympic Gold Medalists, and professional and amateur athletes, helping improve performance and overall well-being.

Arnold later joined the University of Washington men’s basketball program as general manager and director of mental performance, after working as mental performance coach for the 2024 Mountain West Champion Utah State Aggies.

== Personal life ==
Arnold is the son of former BYU head coach Frank Arnold. He is a father of five children. Several of his children are involved in sports at collegiate levels. As a certified USA Triathlon coach, Arnold has completed several Ironman triathlons as well as completing the Boston Marathon in 2019.

== Head coaching record ==
=== Junior college ===
Record table
Season	Team	Overall	Conference	Standing	Postseason
Southern Idaho Golden Eagles (Scenic West Athletic Conference) (2003–2005)
2003–04	Southern Idaho	24–11	15–9	T–3rd	NJCAA First Round
2004–05	Southern Idaho	33–3	16–2	1st	NJCAA Third place
Southern Idaho:		57–14 (.803)	31–11		
Total:		57–14 (.803)			
National champion Postseason invitational champion Conference regular season champion Conference regular season and conference tournament champion Division regular season champion Division regular season and conference tournament champion Conference tournament champion

=== College ===
Record table
Season	Team	Overall	Conference	Standing	Postseason
Hawaii Rainbow Warriors (Western Athletic Conference) (2010–2012)
2010–11	Hawaii	19–13	8–8	T–5th	CIT Second Round
2011–12	Hawaii	16–16	6–8	T–5th	
Hawaii Rainbow Warriors (Big West Conference) (2012–2014)
2012–13	Hawaii	17–15	10–8	4th	CIT First Round
2013–14	Hawaii	20–11	9–7	3rd	
Hawaii:		72–55 (.567)	33–31(.516)		
Total:		72–55 (.567)			
National champion Postseason invitational champion Conference regular season champion Conference regular season and conference tournament champion Division regular season champion Division regular season and conference tournament champion Conference tournament champion
