= Lamond Murray Jr. =

American basketball player, entrepreneur, and model

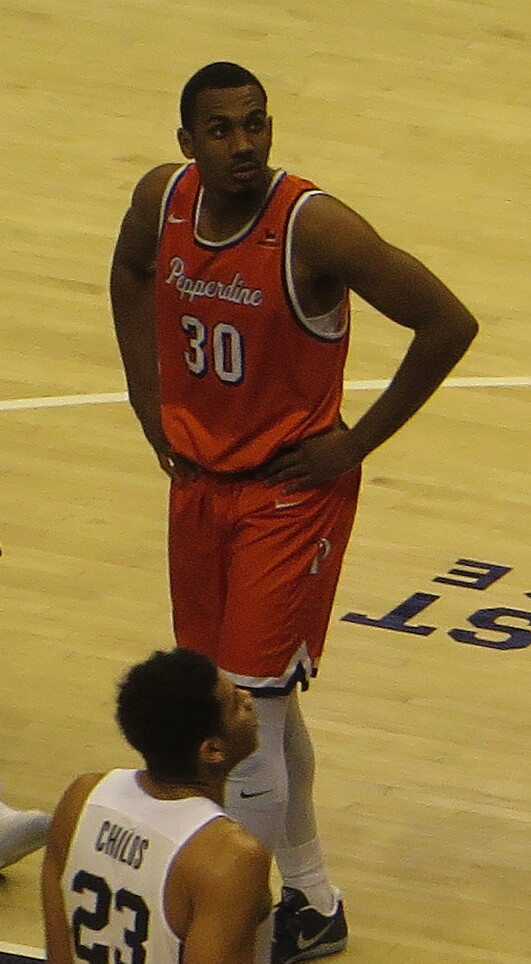

Personal information
- Born: November 11, 1994 (age 32) Los Angeles, California
- Listed height: 6 ft 5 in (1.96 m)
- Listed weight: 200 lb (91 kg)

Career information
- High school: Bishop Montgomery (Torrance, California)
- College: Pepperdine (2013–2017)
- NBA draft: 2017: undrafted
- Playing career: 2017–2019
- Position: Shooting guard / small forward

Career history
- 2017–2018: Aries Trikala
- 2018: Maine Red Claws
- 2018–2019: VL Pesaro
- 2019: Rethymno Cretan Kings

Career highlights
- First-team All-WCC (2017); Second-team All-WCC (2016)

Lamond Maurice Murray Jr. (born November 11, 1994) is an American professional basketball player, entrepreneur, and model. Last played for the Rethymno Cretan Kings of the Greek Basket League. Standing at 1.96 metres (6 feet 5 inches), he plays the shooting guard and the small forward position. He played college basketball at Pepperdine.

== High school career ==
Murray played high school basketball at Bishop Montgomery. Murray averaged 22.3 points and 9.6 rebounds as a senior and was named the Daily Breeze Area Player of the Year, the Del Rey League MVP and to the All-CIF Southern Section Division IV-AA first team. MaxPreps named him to the all-state first team in Division IV and to the third team overall and helped Bishop Montgomery to a 32–2 record, including a 29-game win streak that ended in the regional final.

== College career ==
As a freshman Murray played 27 games, producing 4 points and 2.2 rebounds per game with a total of 108 points. As a sophomore Murray played in 28 contests, improving his numbers, averaging 6.9 points, 3.1 rebounds and 0.3 blocks per game. As a junior, Murray made a breakout season, averaging 16.5 points and 5.4 rebounds in 32 games and was named to the All-WCC second-team. During his last season, he averaged 21.3 points, 5.7 rebounds and 1.3 assists per game and was named to the All-WCC first-team and leading the league in scoring.

== Professional career ==
After going undrafted in the 2017 NBA draft, Murray joined Miami Heat for the 2017 NBA Summer League, where he averaged 5.7 points and 2.5 rebounds in four games. On July 23, 2017, Murray signed with the Greek League club Aries Trikala. In January 2018, he left the club due to financial problems. On February 28, he signed with the Maine Red Claws of the NBA G League.

On August 3, 2018, Murray signed with VL Pesaro.

On October 14, 2019, Murray returned to Greece and signed with the Rethymno Cretan Kings, replacing Jarvis Garrett.

In 2019 he starred as the male major role in K. Michelle's “Supahood” ft. Kash Doll, and Yung Miami from City Girls as the male counterpart for Kash Doll.

In 2020 he made an appearance for “Time out for English”, a non profit organization aimed at teaching children across the world the English language.

== Personal life ==
Murray's father, Lamond Murray, was also a professional basketball player who played in the NBA from 1994 until 2006.

He has a younger sister named Ashley Murray and is family friends with Aubrey “Drizzy” Graham.
