= Kevin Bromley =

American basketball coach

Current position
- Title: Assistant coach
- Team: UC Santa Barbara
- Conference: Big West

Biographical details
- Born: October 22, 1959 (age 67); Denver, Colorado, U.S.

Playing career
- 1979–1981: Mid-Plains CC
- 1981–1983: Colorado State
- Position: Point guard

Coaching career (HC unless noted)
- 1984–1987: Colorado State (asst.)
- 1987–1989: Chemeketa CC
- 1989–1993: Cal Poly Pomona (asst.)
- 1993–1996: Southern Utah (asst.)
- 1995–2001: Cal Poly (asst.)
- 2001–2009: Cal Poly
- 2011–present: UC Santa Barbara (asst.)

Head coaching record
- Overall: 99–145

Kevin Bromley (born October 22, 1959) is an American former basketball coach, who was most recently an assistant at UC Santa Barbara. Bromley joined UCSB as an assistant coach in 2011. He was the head coach for Cal Poly from 2001–2009, compiling an overall record of 99–145.

== Before coaching ==
Bromley played college basketball for Mid-Plains Community College and Colorado State. He graduated from CSU in 1983 with a bachelor's degree in Physical Education. He earned a master's in Education Administration a year later.

== Coaching career ==
Bromley's first coaching job was as an assistant at Colorado State, beginning in 1984.

He would leave CSU to coach at Chemeketa Community College, where his teams had a 56–7 record over two seasons.

After Bromley left Chemeketa, he spent time an assistant at Cal Poly Pomona and Southern Utah, before arriving at Cal Poly in 1995. When Cal Poly's head coach left in the middle of the 2000–01 season, Bromley became the interim head coach. At the end of the season, Bromley was given the job full-time, despite a 4–12 record as interim coach.

In 2002–03, just his second full season as the Mustangs' head coach, Bromley's team went 16–14, and reached the finals of the Big West Conference Tournament. The next three seasons were a struggle.

In the 2006–07 season, Bromley's team was 19–11, a record number of wins for Cal Poly in its Division I era. They again reached the championship game of the Big West Tournament, but were defeated.

Bromley was fired by Cal Poly following the 2008–09 season, in which he led the Mustangs to a 7–21 overall mark and a 3–13 Big West record. Bromley's overall head coaching record was 99–145.

Subsequently, in May 2010, he joined UC Santa Barbara as an assistant coach. After helping UCSB advance to the NCAA Tournament in 2011, Bromley was fired along with head coach Bob Williams after recording a 6–22 record in 2017. He then transitioned into a role of director of development at UCSB, coordinating various fundraising efforts for the Gauchos' athletic department.

== Career coaching record ==
School	Season	Wins	Losses	Postseason
Cal Poly	2000–01	4	12
Cal Poly	2001–02	15	12
Cal Poly	2002–03	15	12	Big West Tournament Runner–Up
Cal Poly	2003–04	11	16	Big West Tournament First Round
Cal Poly	2004–05	5	22
Cal Poly	2005–06	10	19	Big West Tournament Semifinals
Cal Poly	2006–07	19	11	Big West Tournament Runner–Up
Cal Poly	2007–08	12	15
Cal Poly	2008–09	7	21
Career	Totals	99	145
