= Craig Neal =

American basketball player and coach (born 1964)

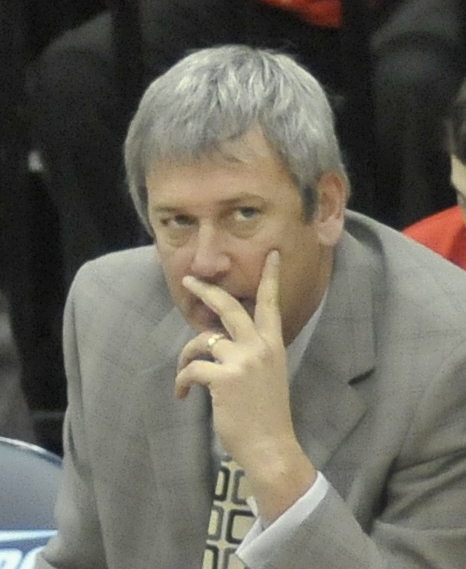
- Neal in 2008 at the Jenny Craig Pavilion in San Diego

Nevada Wolf Pack
- Title: Associate head coach
- League: Mountain West Conference

Personal information
- Born: February 16, 1964 (age 62) Muncie, Indiana, U.S.
- Listed height: 6 ft 5 in (1.96 m)
- Listed weight: 165 lb (75 kg)

Career information
- High school: Washington (Washington, Indiana)
- College: Georgia Tech (1983–1988)
- NBA draft: 1988: 3rd round, 71st overall pick
- Drafted by: Portland Trail Blazers
- Playing career: 1988–1995
- Position: Shooting guard
- Number: 10, 11, 22
- Coaching career: 2000–present

Career history

Playing
- 1988: Jacksonville Hooters
- 1988–1989: Portland Trail Blazers
- 1989: Miami Heat
- 1989–1990: Rapid City Thrillers
- 1990–1991: Columbus Horizon
- 1991: Denver Nuggets
- 1991: Florida Jades
- 1991–1993: Rapid City Thrillers
- 1993–1994: Fort Wayne Fury
- 1994: Omaha Racers
- 1994–1995: Fort Wayne Fury

Coaching
- 2000–2003: Toronto Raptors (assistant)
- 2004–2007: Iowa (Associate HC)
- 2007–2013: New Mexico (Associate HC)
- 2013–2017: New Mexico
- 2019–present: Nevada (Associate HC)

Career highlights
- As player: WBL All-Star (1991); As head coach: Mountain West tournament champion (2014)
- Stats at NBA.com
- Stats at Basketball Reference
Medals
Men's basketball
Representing United States
FIBA Americas Championship
Gold medal – first place	1993 San Juan	Team competition

Craig Duane Neal (born February 16, 1964) is an American basketball coach and former player who is the associate head coach for the Nevada Wolf Pack of the Mountain West Conference (MWC). He played professionally in the National Basketball Association (NBA).

Neal played college basketball for the Georgia Tech Yellow Jackets and was selected by the Portland Trail Blazers in the third round (71st pick overall) of the 1988 NBA draft. He played in the NBA and several minor leagues.

== High school ==
He was brought up in Washington, Indiana, where he played high school basketball at Washington High School, coached by his father, Stan. As a senior in 1983, he earned all-American and all-state honors, averaging 27.6 points per game and leading his 25-2 Washington High School team to the semi-state finals. He scored 1,440 points in his Hatchets career.

== College playing career ==
In 1982, Neal signed with the Georgia Institute of Technology (Georgia Tech) to play basketball under coach Bobby Cremins.

Neal played for the Georgia Tech Yellow Jackets from 1983 to 1988. Due to a season-ending injury, Neal played only four games in his sophomore season in 1984–85 and redshirted that year. As a senior in 1987–88, Neal set the ACC single-season record with 303 assists while averaging a league-best 9.5 assists per game in addition to 7.7 points.

During Neal's time at Georgia Tech, the Yellow Jackets made the 1984 NIT and subsequent NCAA Tournaments the following four years, including trips to the Elite Eight in 1985 and Sweet Sixteen in 1986.

Neal graduated with a bachelor's degree in management in 1988.

== Professional playing career ==
In the 1988 NBA draft, the Portland Trail Blazers picked Neal in the third round, 71st overall. Neal began his basketball career playing for the Jacksonville Hooters of the USBL. In his rookie NBA season, Neal played 21 games for the Portland Trail Blazers before being waived on January 11, 1989. On February 3, Neal signed as a free agent with the Miami Heat and played 32 games.

After playing in the CBA in the 1989–90 season, Neal returned to the NBA in 1990 as a free agent with the Chicago Bulls but was released before the regular season. On February 12, 1991, Neal signed with the Denver Nuggets. In 10 games, Neal averaged 12.5 minutes and 4.4 points before being waived on March 3.

Neal later played for the Florida Jades of the World Basketball League in 1991 and he was the Most Valuable Player in the 1991 WBL All-Star Game.

Neal served as a player and coach for the Fort Wayne Fury of the CBA in 1994–95.

== NBA scouting and coaching career ==
In 1996, Neal joined the Toronto Raptors of the NBA as a scout before becoming an assistant coach for the team under Lenny Wilkens in 2000. For three years, Neal coached the Raptors' summer league team and led pre-draft workouts for prospects. After Wilkens was fired, Neal returned to a scouting role for the Raptors during the 2003–04 season.

== College coaching career ==
=== Iowa ===
In August 2004, Craig Neal joined long-time friend and head coach Steve Alford at the University of Iowa. Neal and Alford had known each other since they were in the third grade. With Neal as Associate Head Coach, Iowa posted a 63–35 record, including consecutive trips to the NCAA Tournament in 2005 and 2006. The Hawkeyes won 25 games in 2005–06. They also captured the 2006 Big Ten Conference tournament title and ran off a school record 19-game winning streak in Carver-Hawkeye Arena, winning all 17 home games in 2005–06.

=== New Mexico ===
On March 27, 2007, Craig Neal followed Steve Alford to New Mexico and became the Associate Head Coach of the Lobos. In his first year at New Mexico, Craig Neal played an essential role in turning New Mexico into a competitive team. In addition, the Lobos made the NIT, their first trip to the postseason since 2005. In 2010 and 2012, New Mexico reached the NCAA tournament (winning both opening round games). In 2013. New Mexico reached the NCAA tournament as the number 3 seed, losing in the first round to 14th seed Harvard.

On April 2, 2013, New Mexico promoted Neal to Head Coach after Alford left to take the head coaching position at UCLA. Neal signed a five-year contract worth $750,000 annually plus incentives. At his introductory press conference Neal remarked "It's just been amazing, this has been one of the happiest days of my life. Steve set the bar really high, I'm going to try and jump over it."

In Neal's first season as head coach, New Mexico finished 27–7, including 15–3 and second place in the Mountain West Conference. New Mexico beat San Diego State in the Mountain West tournament, finished the season ranked 17th in the AP Poll, and earned an automatic bid to the NCAA tournament. As a 7 seed in the tournament, New Mexico lost in the Round of 64 to 10 seed Stanford. New Mexico Athletic Director Paul Krebs rewarded Neal with a two-year contract extension.

However, New Mexico went 15–16 the following year and 17–15 in 2015–16 and failed to make the NCAA tournament. Neal's son Cullen, a starting guard on the team, left the program after the year. In 2016–17, New Mexico went 17–14 and marked the first time in the nearly 50-year history of The Pit that home attendance did not rank in the top 25 in Division I. By the end of the season, four players who had eligibility remaining decided to leave the program, including leading scorer Elijah Brown.

On March 31, 2017, New Mexico fired Neal 3 weeks after Lobos AD Paul Krebs announced that Neal would return next season. Acting university president Chaouki Abdallah stated: "The decision made late tonight comes after lengthy consideration in light of recent developments that cannot be ignored."

=== Nevada ===
After spending two seasons out of college basketball, Neal rejoined his old friend Steve Alford, now the Head Coach at Nevada, before the 2019–20 season. Neal was hired as associate head coach and became the highest paid assistant coach in Nevada athletics history.

== Personal life ==
Neal founded the Craig Neal/Grant Delagrange Benefit Golf Tournament in Fort Wayne, Indiana, to raise money for schools to support children with autism and Down syndrome. In addition, while in Toronto, Craig Neal was involved with the NBA's Team Up community service program.

Neal and his wife, Janet, have two sons, Cullen and Dalton. Cullen played five seasons of college basketball and is now a staff member at Rice. Craig's younger brother Shane played four seasons for the University of Tennessee-Chattanooga Mocs men's basketball team, and their father Stan played college basketball at Ball State University.

== Career playing statistics ==
Legend
GP	Games played	GS	Games started	MPG	Minutes per game
FG%	Field goal percentage	3P%	3-point field goal percentage	FT%	Free throw percentage
RPG	Rebounds per game	APG	Assists per game	SPG	Steals per game
BPG	Blocks per game	PPG	Points per game	**Bold**	Career high

=== NBA ===
==== Regular season ====
Year	Team	GP	GS	MPG	FG%	3P%	FT%	RPG	APG	SPG	BPG	PPG
1988–89	Portland	21	0	7.6	.314	.222	.500	.5	1.5	.4	.0	1.2
1988–89	Miami	**32**	0	10.7	.386	.320	**.619**	.6	2.7	**.5**	**.1**	2.8
1990–91	Denver	10	0	**12.5**	**.400**	**.333**	.591	**1.6**	**3.7**	.4	.0	**4.4**
Career		63	0	9.9	.373	.302	.600	.7	2.5	.4	.1	2.5

== Head coaching record ==
Record table
Season	Team	Overall	Conference	Standing	Postseason
**New Mexico Lobos** (Mountain West Conference) (2013–2017)
2013–14	New Mexico	27–7	15–3	2nd	NCAA round of 64
2014–15	New Mexico	15–16	7–11	8th	
2015–16	New Mexico	17–15	10–8	T–4th	
2016–17	New Mexico	17–14	10–8	5th	
New Mexico:		76–52 (.594)	42–30 (.583)		
Total:		76–52 (.594)			
National champion Postseason invitational champion Conference regular season champion Conference regular season and conference tournament champion Division regular season champion Division regular season and conference tournament champion Conference tournament champion
