= 2013–14 Boise State Broncos men's basketball team =

American college basketball season

2013–14 Boise State Broncos men's basketball
- Conference: Mountain West Conference
- Record: 21–13 (9–9 MW)
- Head coach: Leon Rice
- Assistant coaches: Jeff Linder; John Rillie; Danny Henderson
- Home arena: Taco Bell Arena

2013–14 Mountain West Conference men's basketball standings
	Conf.				Overall
Team	W		L	PCT	W		L	PCT
No. 13 San Diego State	16	–	2	.889	31	–	5	.861
No. 17 New Mexico †	15	–	3	.833	27	–	7	.794
UNLV	10	–	8	.556	20	–	13	.606
Nevada	10	–	8	.556	15	–	17	.469
Boise State	9	–	9	.500	21	–	13	.618
Wyoming	9	–	9	.500	18	–	15	.545
Fresno State	9	–	9	.500	21	–	18	.538
Utah State	7	–	11	.389	18	–	14	.563
Colorado State	7	–	11	.389	16	–	16	.500
Air Force	6	–	12	.333	12	–	18	.400
San Jose State	1	–	17	.056	7	–	24	.226
† 2014 MWC tournament winner Rankings from AP poll

The 2013–14 Boise State Broncos men's basketball team represented Boise State University during the 2013–14 NCAA Division I men's basketball season. The Broncos, led by fourth year head coach Leon Rice, played their home games at Taco Bell Arena and were a member of the Mountain West Conference. They finished the season 21–13, 9–9 in Mountain West play to finish in a tie for fifth place. They advanced to the semifinals of the Mountain West Conference tournament where they lost to New Mexico. Despite having 21 wins, after not being invited to the NIT, the Broncos, citing injuries, chose not to accept an invitation to the CBI or CIT.

Taco Bell Arena had a new court design for this season

== Departures ==
Name	Number	Pos.	Height	Weight	Year	Hometown	Notes
Kenny Buckner	42	C	6'7"	251	Senior	Washington, D.C.	Graduated

== Recruiting ==
College recruiting information
Name	Hometown	School	Height	Weight	Commit date
Dezmyn Trent; SG	Tacoma, WA	Henry Foss High School	6 ft 4 in (1.93 m)	180 lb (82 kg)	Mar 6, 2013
Dezmyn Trent; SG	Recruit ratings: Scout: Rivals: (65)				
James Webb III; PF	Augusta, GA	North Idaho College	6 ft 9 in (2.06 m)	190 lb (86 kg)	Nov 14, 2012
James Webb III; PF	Recruit ratings: Scout: Rivals: (JC)				
Nick Duncan; PF	Sydney, AUS	Australian Institute of Sport	6 ft 8 in (2.03 m)	225 lb (102 kg)	Apr 19, 2013
Nick Duncan; PF	Recruit ratings: Scout: Rivals: (N/A)				
Overall recruit ranking: Scout: – Rivals: –
Note: In many cases, Scout, Rivals, 247Sports, On3, and ESPN may conflict in their listings of height and weight.; In these cases, the average was taken. ESPN grades are on a 100-point scale.; Sources: "Boise State Commit List for 2013". Rivals.; "Men's Basketball Recruiting". Scout.; "ESPN – Boise State Broncos Basketball Recruiting 2013". ESPN.; "Scout.com Team Recruiting Rankings". Scout.; "2013 Team Ranking". Rivals.

== Roster ==
2013–14 Boise State Broncos men's basketball team
Players
Coaches

Pos.	#	Name	Height	Weight	Year	Previous school	Hometown
F	0	Ryan Watkins	6 ft 9 in (2.06 m)	229 lb (104 kg)	Sr	Reseda HS	Santa Clarita, CA
G	1	Mikey Thompson	6 ft 3 in (1.91 m)	167 lb (76 kg)	RS So	Canyon Springs HS	North Las Vegas, NV
G	2	Derrick Marks	6 ft 3 in (1.91 m)	206 lb (93 kg)	Jr	Plainfield Central HS	Chicago, IL
G/F	3	Anthony Drmic	6 ft 6 in (1.98 m)	196 lb (89 kg)	Jr	Australian Institute of Sport	Endeavour Hills, AUS
F	4	Thomas Bropleh	6 ft 5 in (1.96 m)	203 lb (92 kg)	Sr	George Washington HS	Denver, CO
G	5	Joe Hanstad	6 ft 4 in (1.93 m)	193 lb (88 kg)	Jr	Dickinson HS	Dickinson, ND
G	11	Jeff Elorriaga	6 ft 2 in (1.88 m)	180 lb (82 kg)	Sr	Jesuit HS	Portland, OR
G	12	Igor Hadziomerovic	6 ft 4 in (1.93 m)	202 lb (92 kg)	Jr	Australian Institute of Sport	Melbourne, AUS
F	13	Nicholas Duncan	6 ft 7 in (2.01 m)	225 lb (102 kg)	Fr	Australian Institute of Sport	Sydney, AUS
G	14	Chris Nealey	6 ft 2 in (1.88 m)	191 lb (87 kg)	Fr	Mater Dei HS	Newport Beach, CA
F	20	Joey Nebeker	6 ft 7 in (2.01 m)	222 lb (101 kg)	RS Fr	Melba HS	Melba, ID
F	21	Edmunds Dukulis	6 ft 9 in (2.06 m)	225 lb (102 kg)	So	Riga Sec. School	Riga, LAT
G/F	22	Rob Heyer	6 ft 3 in (1.91 m)	207 lb (94 kg)	Sr	Texas-Permian Basian	Worland, WY
F	23	James Webb III	6 ft 8 in (2.03 m)	185 lb (84 kg)	So	North Idaho College	Augusta, GA
G	25	Dezmyn Trent	6 ft 2 in (1.88 m)	201 lb (91 kg)	Fr	Henry Foss HS	Tacoma, WA
F	34	Jake Ness	6 ft 8 in (2.03 m)	214 lb (97 kg)	Jr	Billings West HS	Coeur d'Alene, ID

Head coach

- Leon Rice (Washington State)

Assistant coach(es)

- Jeff Linder (Western State)
- John Rillie (Gonzaga)
- Danny Henderson (Austin College)

Legend

- (C) Team captain
- (S) Suspended
- (I) Ineligible
- (W) Walk-on
- Injured
- Current redshirt

Roster

== Schedule ==
Date time, TV	Opponent	Result	Record	Site (attendance) city, state
Exhibition
Nov 1*; 7:00 pm	Lewis–Clark State	W 80–52		Taco Bell Arena (3,467); Boise, ID
Regular season
Nov 8*; 8:00 pm	Texas–Arlington	W 116–87	1–0	Taco Bell Arena (5,662); Boise, ID
Nov 15*; 7:00 pm	Simpson	W 110–53	2–0	Taco Bell Arena (5,339); Boise, ID
Nov 19*; 7:00 pm, RTNW	Seattle	W 86–68	3–0	Taco Bell Arena (4,518); Boise, ID
Nov 23*; 10:00 am	at New Orleans	W 100–80	4–0	Lakefront Arena (1,894); New Orleans, LA
Nov 27*; 7:00 pm, RTNW	vs. Idaho	W 98–89	5–0	CenturyLink Arena (5,747); Boise, ID
Nov 29*; 6:00 pm	Portland State	W 76–60	6–0	Taco Bell Arena (6,345); Boise, ID
Dec 3*; 8:05 pm, CBSSN	Utah	W 69–67	7–0	Taco Bell Arena (7,151); Boise, ID
Dec 5*; 8:00 pm	Carroll	W 80–52	8–0	Taco Bell Arena (5,083); Boise, ID
Dec 10*; 7:00 pm, ESPN	at No. 11 Kentucky	L 55–70	8–1	Rupp Arena (21,565); Lexington, KY
Dec 14*; 4:00 pm, RTNW	Saint Mary's; Diamond Head Classic mainland round	L 74–82	8–2	Taco Bell Arena (8,234); Boise, ID
Dec 22*; 11:00 pm, ESPNU	at Hawaiʻi; Diamond Head Classic first round	W 62–61	9–2	Stan Sheriff Center (8,093); Honolulu, HI
Dec 23*; 7:00 pm, ESPN2	vs. South Carolina; Diamond Head Classic semifinals	W 80–54	10–2	Stan Sheriff Center (6,438); Honolulu, HI
Dec 25*; 6:30 pm, ESPN2	vs. No. 14 Iowa State; Diamond Head Classic championship	L 66–70	10–3	Stan Sheriff Center (6,769); Honolulu, HI
Jan 4; 7:00 pm, ESPN3	Fresno State	W 86–79	11–3 (1–0)	Taco Bell Arena (7,527); Boise, ID
Jan 8; 9:00 pm, ESPNU	at No. 13 San Diego State	L 66–69	11–4 (1–1)	Viejas Arena (12,414); San Diego, CA
Jan 11; 7:00 pm, ESPN3	Wyoming	L 50–52	11–5 (1–2)	Taco Bell Arena (7,445); Boise, ID
Jan 14; 8:05 pm, MWN	at Nevada	W 74–65	12–5 (2–2)	Lawlor Events Center (8,669); Reno, NV
Jan 18; 7:00 pm, ESPN3	Utah State	W 78–74	13–5 (3–2)	Taco Bell Arena (7,969); Boise, ID
Jan 21; 7:15 pm, CBSSN	at New Mexico	L 75–84	13–6 (3–3)	The Pit (15,242); Albuquerque, NM
Jan 25; 4:00 pm, RTNW	San Jose State	W 76–55	14–6 (4–3)	Taco Bell Arena (6,845); Boise, ID
Jan 29; 7:00 pm, RTNW	Air Force	W 69–58	15–6 (5–3)	Taco Bell Arena (5,006); Boise, ID
Feb 1; 6:00 pm, CBSSN	at UNLV	L 69–73	15–7 (5–4)	Thomas & Mack Center (13,982); Paradise, NV
Feb 5; 7:15 pm, CBSSN	No. 5 San Diego State	L 65–67	15–8 (5–5)	Taco Bell Arena (9,602); Boise, ID
Feb 8; 4:00 pm, CBSSN	at Utah State	L 70–76	15–9 (5–6)	Dee Glen Smith Spectrum (10,011); Logan, UT
Feb 12; 7:15 pm, CBSSN	New Mexico	W 71–70	16–9 (6–6)	Taco Bell Arena (6,329); Boise, ID
Feb 18; 7:00 pm, ESPN3	at Colorado State	W 84–72	17–9 (7–6)	Moby Arena (3,659); Ft. Collins, CO
Feb 22; 6:00 pm, CBSSN	UNLV	W 91–90 ^{OT}	18–9 (8–6)	Taco Bell Arena (9,010); Boise, ID
Feb 26; 7:00 pm, CBSSN	at Fresno State	L 56–76	18–10 (8–7)	Save Mart Center (6,331); Fresno, CA
Mar 1; 4:00 pm, CBSSN	at Wyoming	W 72–63	19–10 (9–7)	Arena-Auditorium (5,389); Laramie, WY
Mar 5; 7:00 pm, MWN	Nevada	L 81–83 ^{2OT}	19–11 (9–8)	Taco Bell Arena (6,892); Boise, ID
Mar 8; 12:00 pm, RTNW	at Air Force	L 61–64 ^{OT}	19–12 (9–9)	Clune Arena (2,689); Colorado Springs, CO
Mountain West tournament
Mar 12; 8:00 pm, MWN	vs. San Jose State; First round	W 83–52	20–12	Thomas & Mack Center (5,824); Paradise, NV
Mar 13; 9:30 pm, CBSSN	vs. Nevada; Quarterfinals	W 75–62	21–12	Thomas & Mack Center (10,645); Paradise, NV
Mar 14; 9:30 pm, CBSSN	vs. No. 20 New Mexico; Semifinals	L 67–70	21–13	Thomas & Mack Center (15,135); Paradise, NV
*Non-conference game. ^{#}Rankings from AP Poll. (#) Tournament seedings in parentheses. All times are in Mountain Time.
