= 2013–14 Fresno State Bulldogs men's basketball team =

American college basketball season

2013–14 Fresno State Bulldogs men's basketball

CBI, Runner-Up
- Conference: Mountain West Conference
- Record: 21–18 (9–9 Mountain West)
- Head coach: Rodney Terry
- Assistant coaches: Michael Schwartz; Byron Jones; Kenton Paulino
- Home arena: Save Mart Center

2013–14 Mountain West Conference men's basketball standings
	Conf.				Overall
Team	W		L	PCT	W		L	PCT
No. 13 San Diego State	16	–	2	.889	31	–	5	.861
No. 17 New Mexico †	15	–	3	.833	27	–	7	.794
UNLV	10	–	8	.556	20	–	13	.606
Nevada	10	–	8	.556	15	–	17	.469
Boise State	9	–	9	.500	21	–	13	.618
Wyoming	9	–	9	.500	18	–	15	.545
Fresno State	9	–	9	.500	21	–	18	.538
Utah State	7	–	11	.389	18	–	14	.563
Colorado State	7	–	11	.389	16	–	16	.500
Air Force	6	–	12	.333	12	–	18	.400
San Jose State	1	–	17	.056	7	–	24	.226
† 2014 MWC tournament winner Rankings from AP poll

The 2013–14 Fresno State Bulldogs men's basketball team represented California State University, Fresno during the 2013–14 NCAA Division I men's basketball season. This was head coach Rodney Terry's third season at Fresno State. The Bulldogs played their home games at the Save Mart Center and they were members of the Mountain West Conference. They finished the season 21–18, 9–9 in Mountain West play to finish in a tie for fifth place. They lost in the quarterfinals of the Mountain West Conference tournament to New Mexico. They were invited to the College Basketball Invitational where they advanced to the best of 3 finals where they lost to Siena 1 games to 2.

== Departures ==
Name	Number	Pos.	Height	Weight	Year	Hometown	Notes
Jerry Brown	0	F	6'7"	220	RS Junior	Richmond, CA	Transfer to Santa Clara
Kevin Olekaibe	3	G	6'2"	180	Junior	Las Vegas, NV	Transfer to UNLV
Aaron Anderson	11	G	6'3"	190	Freshman	Edmond, OK	Transfer to Central Oklahoma
Garrett Johnson	20	G	6'4"	195	Senior	Pomona, CA	Graduated
Brad Ely	22	G	6'3"	195	Senior	Visalia, CA	Graduated
Kevin Foster	24	F	6'8"	230	Senior	Lakeland, FL	Graduated
Robert Upshaw	25	C	7'0"	250	Sophomore	Fresno, CA	Transfer to Washington

== Recruiting ==
College recruiting information
Name	Hometown	School	Height	Weight	Commit date
Soma Edo; PF	Richardson, TX	Bernker High School	6 ft 5 in (1.96 m)	225 lb (102 kg)	Nov 21, 2012
Soma Edo; PF	Recruit ratings: Scout: Rivals: (74)				
Paul Watson; SF	Phoenix, AZ	Paradise Valley	6 ft 6 in (1.98 m)	180 lb (82 kg)	Aug 26, 2012
Paul Watson; SF	Recruit ratings: Scout: Rivals: (70)				
Alex Davis; PF	Houston, TX	Hutchinson Community College	6 ft 9 in (2.06 m)	210 lb (95 kg)	Jun 19, 2012
Alex Davis; PF	Recruit ratings: Scout: Rivals: (N/A)				
Overall recruit ranking: Scout: – Rivals: –
Note: In many cases, Scout, Rivals, 247Sports, On3, and ESPN may conflict in their listings of height and weight.; In these cases, the average was taken. ESPN grades are on a 100-point scale.; Sources: "Fresno State Commit List for 2013". Rivals.; "Men's Basketball Recruiting". Scout.; "ESPN – Fresno State Bulldogs Basketball Recruiting 2013". ESPN.; "Scout.com Team Recruiting Rankings". Scout.; "2013 Team Ranking". Rivals.

== Roster ==
2013–14 Fresno State Bulldogs men's basketball team
Players
Coaches

Pos.	#	Name	Height	Weight	Year	Previous school	Hometown
G	0	Emmanuel Owootoah	5 ft 11 in (1.8 m)	175 lb (79 kg)	Fr	Cordia HS	Toronto, ON
G	1	Tyler Johnson	6 ft 2 in (1.88 m)	186 lb (84 kg)	Sr	Saint Francis HS	Mountain View, CA
F	2	Braeden Anderson	6 ft 9 in (2.06 m)	225 lb (102 kg)	So	Wilbraham & Monson Acad.	Alberta
G	3	Cezar Guerrero	6 ft 1 in (1.85 m)	190 lb (86 kg)	RS So	Oklahoma State	Huntington Park, CA
F	4	Karachi Edo	6 ft 6 in (1.98 m)	226 lb (103 kg)	Fr	Berkner HS	Richardson, TX
F/C	5	Tanner Giddings	6 ft 11 in (2.11 m)	226 lb (103 kg)	So	Windsor HS	Windsor, CA
F	10	Alex Davis	6 ft 9 in (2.06 m)	205 lb (93 kg)	Jr	Hutchinson CC	Houston, TX
G	13	Blake Williams	6 ft 2 in (1.88 m)	197 lb (89 kg)	RS Fr	Kennedy HS	Sacramento, CA
G	14	Julien Lewis	6 ft 3 in (1.91 m)	190 lb (86 kg)	Jr	Texas	Galveston, TX
G/F	22	Paul Watson	6 ft 7 in (2.01 m)	187 lb (85 kg)	Fr	Paradise Valley HS	Phoenix, AZ
G	23	Marvelle Harris	6 ft 4 in (1.93 m)	212 lb (96 kg)	So	Eisenhower HS	Rialto, CA
G/F	25	Broderick Newbill	6 ft 5 in (1.96 m)	195 lb (88 kg)	RS Fr	Hogan Prep Acad.	Kansas City, MO
G	55	Allen Huddleston	6 ft 1 in (1.85 m)	183 lb (83 kg)	RS Sr	Pacific	Merced, CA

Head coach

- Rodney Terry (St. Edward's)

Assistant coach(es)

- Michael Schwartz (Texas)
- Bryon Jones (Central Oklahoma)
- Kenton Paulino (Texas)

Legend

- (C) Team captain
- (S) Suspended
- (I) Ineligible
- (W) Walk-on
- Injured
- Current redshirt

Roster
Last update: 2013-07-20

== Schedule and results ==
Date time, TV	Opponent	Result	Record	Site (attendance) city, state
Exitbition
Nov 1*; 7:00 pm	Cal State Stanislaus	W 76–71	–	Save Mart Center (N/A); Fresno, CA
Nov 4*; 7:00 pm	Dominican	W 91–67	–	Save Mart Center (N/A); Fresno, CA
Regular season
Nov 8*; 7:00 pm	at UC Irvine	W 98–97 ^{OT}	1–0	Bren Events Center (3,241); Irvine, CA
Nov 12*; 4:00 pm, ESPN3	at Pittsburgh	L 54–75	1–1	Petersen Events Center (8,543); Pittsburgh, PA
Nov 16*; 7:00 pm	Cal State Northridge	W 80–64	2–1	Save Mart Center (14,770); Fresno, CA
Nov 20*; 7:00 pm	Cal Poly	W 63–46	3–1	Save Mart Center (6,085); Fresno, CA
Nov 23*; 7:30 pm	at Pacific	L 77–86	3–2	Alex G. Spanos Center (3,204); Stockton, CA
Nov 25*; 7:00 pm	San Diego Christian	W 92–59	4–2	Save Mart Center (5,813); Fresno, CA
Nov 29*; 7:00 pm	Drake; Fresno State Tournament	L 74–84	4–3	Save Mart Center (6,170); Fresno, CA
Nov 30*; 7:00 pm	Cal State Bakersfield; Fresno State Tournament	W 96–86 ^{OT}	5–3	Save Mart Center (6,022); Fresno, CA
Dec 1*; 2:00 pm	Northern Arizona; Fresno State Tournament	W 71–67 ^{OT}	6–3	Save Mart Center (5,807); Fresno, CA
Dec 7*; 2:00 pm, P12N	at Utah	L 77–90	6–4	Jon M. Huntsman Center (8,189); Salt Lake City, UT
Dec 14*; 3:00 pm, P12N	at California	L 56–67	6–5	Haas Pavilion (9,342); Berkeley, CA
Dec 21*; 1:30 pm, FSN	vs. No. 16 Florida; Orange Bowl Basketball Classic	L 49–66	6–6	BB&T Center (11,214); Sunrise, FL
Dec 28*; 4:00 pm	UC Merced	W 104–43	7–6	Save Mart Center (6,377); Fresno, CA
Jan 1; 12:00 pm, ESPN3	UNLV	L 62–75	7–7 (0–1)	Save Mart Center (5,968); Fresno, CA
Jan 4; 6:00 pm, ESPN3	at Boise State	L 79–86	7–8 (0–2)	Taco Bell Arena (7,527); Boise, ID
Jan 8; 7:05 pm	Air Force	W 71–65	8–8 (1–2)	Save Mart Center (5,947); Fresno, CA
Jan 11; 6:00 pm	at Colorado State	L 57–76	8–9 (1–3)	Moby Arena (3,345); Fort Collins, CO
Jan 15; 7:00 pm, ESPN3	at No. 10 San Diego State	L 60–68	8–10 (1–4)	Viejas Arena (12,414); San Diego, CA
Jan 18; 4:00 pm, ESPN3	New Mexico	L 78–89	8–11 (1–5)	Save Mart Center (6,499); Fresno, CA
Jan 22; 7:00 pm	Nevada	L 86–96	8–12 (1–6)	Save Mart Center (5,815); Fresno, CA
Jan 25; 7:05 pm, CBSSN	at UNLV	L 73–75 ^{OT}	8–13 (1–7)	Thomas & Mack Center (13,849); Paradise, NV
Jan 29; 7:00 pm	Wyoming	W 67–62	9–13 (2–7)	Save Mart Center (5,946); Fresno, CA
Feb 5; 6:00 pm	at Air Force	W 68–51	10–13 (3–7)	Clune Arena (1,601); Colorado Springs, CO
Feb 8; 4:00 pm	San Jose State	W 82–56	11–13 (4–7)	Save Mart Center (6,784); Fresno, CA
Feb 12; 7:05 pm	at Nevada	W 75–67	12–13 (5–7)	Lawlor Events Center (6,060); Reno, NV
Feb 15; 5:05 pm, RTRM	Colorado State	W 75–66	13–13 (6–7)	Save Mart Center (6,765); Fresno, CA
Feb 19; 6:05 pm, RTRM	at Wyoming	L 66–72	13–14 (6–8)	Arena-Auditorium (5,386); Laramie, WY
Feb 22; 6:05 pm	at Utah State	W 79–76	14–14 (7–8)	Smith Spectrum (9,939); Logan, UT
Feb 26; 6:05 pm, CBSSN	Boise State	W 76–56	15–14 (8–8)	Save Mart Center (6,331); Fresno, CA
Mar 1; 7:05 pm, CBSSN	San Diego State	L 67–82	15–15 (8–9)	Save Mart Center (14,801); Fresno, CA
Mar 8; 7:00 pm	at San Jose State	W 69–56	16–15 (9–9)	Event Center Arena (2,451); San Jose, CA
Mountain West tournament
Mar 12; 4:30 pm	vs. Air Force; First round	W 61–59	17–15	Thomas & Mack Center (5,824); Paradise, NV
Mar 13; 6:00 pm, CBSSN	vs. No. 20 New Mexico; Quarterfinals	L 77–93	17–16	Thomas & Mack Center (10,645); Paradise, NV
CBI
Mar 19*; 6:00 pm	at UTEP; First round	W 61–56	18–16	Don Haskins Center (5,688); El Paso, TX
Mar 24*; 7:00 pm	Princeton; Quarterfinals	W 72–56	19–16	Save Mart Center (3,637); Fresno, CA
Mar 26*; 7:00 pm	Old Dominion; Semifinals	W 71–64	20–16	Save Mart Center (3,916); Fresno, CA
Mar 31*; 7:00 pm, CBSSN	Siena; Finals Game 1	L 57–61	20–17	Save Mart Center (5,284); Fresno, CA
Apr 2*; 4:00 pm, CBSSN	at Siena; Finals Game 2	W 89–75	21–17	Alumni Recreation Center (3,177); Loudonville, NY
Apr 5*; 8:30 am, CBSSN	at Siena; Finals Game 3	L 68–81	21–18	Alumni Recreation Center (2,788); Loudonville, NY
*Non-conference game. ^{#}Rankings from AP Poll. (#) Tournament seedings in parentheses. All times are in Pacific Time.
