= 2013–14 Nevada Wolf Pack men's basketball team =

American college basketball season

2013–14 Nevada Wolf Pack men's basketball
- Conference: Mountain West Conference
- Record: 15–17 (10–8 MW)
- Head coach: David Carter (5th season)
- Assistant coaches: Doug Novsek; Keith Brown; Zac Claus
- Home arena: Lawlor Events Center

2013–14 Mountain West Conference men's basketball standings
	Conf.				Overall
Team	W		L	PCT	W		L	PCT
No. 13 San Diego State	16	–	2	.889	31	–	5	.861
No. 17 New Mexico †	15	–	3	.833	27	–	7	.794
UNLV	10	–	8	.556	20	–	13	.606
Nevada	10	–	8	.556	15	–	17	.469
Boise State	9	–	9	.500	21	–	13	.618
Wyoming	9	–	9	.500	18	–	15	.545
Fresno State	9	–	9	.500	21	–	18	.538
Utah State	7	–	11	.389	18	–	14	.563
Colorado State	7	–	11	.389	16	–	16	.500
Air Force	6	–	12	.333	12	–	18	.400
San Jose State	1	–	17	.056	7	–	24	.226
† 2014 MWC tournament winner Rankings from AP poll

The 2013–14 Nevada Wolf Pack men's basketball team represented the University of Nevada, Reno during the 2013–14 NCAA Division I men's basketball season. The Wolf Pack, led by fifth year head coach David Carter, played their home games at the Lawlor Events Center and were members of the Mountain West Conference. They finished the season 15–17, 10–8 in Mountain West play to finish in a tie for third place. They lost in the quarterfinals of the Mountain West tournament to Boise State.

== Departures ==
Name	Number	Pos.	Height	Weight	Year	Hometown	Notes
Patrick Nyeko	1	G	6'6"	180	Senior	Reno, NV	Graduated
Devonte Elliott	4	F	6'10"	220	Junior	Los Angeles, CA	Transferred
Brice Crook	11	G	6'4"	205	Junior	Reno, NV	Transferred
Keith Fuetsch	12	G	6'0"	184	Senior	Reno, NV	Graduated
Jordan Finn	15	G	6'4"	196	Junior	Rancho Cucamonga, CA	Transferred
Jordan Burris	20	G	6'7"	218	Junior	Bakersfield, CA	Transferred
Kevin Panzer	33	F	6'9"	220	Junior	Mission Viejo, CA	Transferred
Malik Story	34	G	6'5"	217	Senior	Pasadena, CA	Graduated

== Recruiting ==
College recruiting information
Name	Hometown	School	Height	Weight	Commit date
D.J. Fenner; SF	Seattle, WA	Seattle Prep	6 ft 5 in (1.96 m)	200 lb (91 kg)	Oct 5, 2012
D.J. Fenner; SF	Recruit ratings: Scout: Rivals: (78)				
A.J. West; C	Brooklyn, NY	Monroe College	6 ft 9 in (2.06 m)	230 lb (100 kg)	Mar 31, 2013
A.J. West; C	Recruit ratings: Scout: Rivals: (74)				
Lucas Stivrins; C	Phoenix, AZ	Pratt Community College	6 ft 11 in (2.11 m)	205 lb (93 kg)	Apr 15, 2013
Lucas Stivrins; C	Recruit ratings: Scout: Rivals: (N/A)				
Overall recruit ranking: Scout: – Rivals: –
Note: In many cases, Scout, Rivals, 247Sports, On3, and ESPN may conflict in their listings of height and weight.; In these cases, the average was taken. ESPN grades are on a 100-point scale.; Sources: "Nevada Commit List for 2013". Rivals.; "Men's Basketball Recruiting". Scout.; "ESPN – Nevada Wolf Pack Basketball Recruiting 2013". ESPN.; "Scout.com Team Recruiting Rankings". Scout.; "2013 Team Ranking". Rivals.

== Roster ==
2013–14 Nevada Wolf Pack men's basketball team
Players
Coaches

Pos.	#	Name	Height	Weight	Year	Previous school	Hometown
G	1	Marqueze Coleman	6 ft 3 in (1.91 m)	185 lb (84 kg)	So	Bishop Alemany HS	Mission Hills, CA
F	2	Jerry Evans, Jr.	6 ft 8 in (2.03 m)	210 lb (95 kg)	Sr	Leuzinger HS	Lawndale, CA
C	3	AJ West	6 ft 9 in (2.06 m)	230 lb (104 kg)	Jr	Monroe College	Brooklyn, NY
C	4	Chris Brown	6 ft 11 in (2.11 m)	265 lb (120 kg)	Jr	Western Texas College	Houston, TX
G	11	Patrick Conroy	6 ft 2 in (1.88 m)	180 lb (82 kg)	Fr	Marin Catholic HS	Novato, CA
F	13	Cole Huff	6 ft 8 in (2.03 m)	205 lb (93 kg)	So	Campbell Hall HS	Altadena, CA
G	15	DJ Fenner	6 ft 6 in (1.98 m)	205 lb (93 kg)	Fr	Seattle Prep	Seattle, WA
F	21	Alioune Cheika Fall	6 ft 9 in (2.06 m)	250 lb (113 kg)	Sr	Barstow CC	Thies, SEG
G	23	Michael Perez	6 ft 3 in (1.91 m)	190 lb (86 kg)	RS Jr	UTEP	Tucson, AZ
G	24	Deonte Burton	6 ft 1 in (1.85 m)	190 lb (86 kg)	Sr	Centennial HS	Los Angeles, CA
F/C	33	Ronnie Stevens, Jr.	6 ft 8 in (2.03 m)	230 lb (104 kg)	Jr	Indian Hills CC	Los Angeles, CA
F/C	34	Lucas Stivrins	6 ft 11 in (2.11 m)	212 lb (96 kg)	So	Pratt CC	Scottsdale, AZ
F	41	Richard Bell	6 ft 9 in (2.06 m)	215 lb (98 kg)	RS So	Worthing College Academy of Sports	West Sussex, ENG

Head coach

- David Carter (Saint Mary's)

Assistant coach(es)

- Doug Novsek (Southern Illinois)
- Keith Brown (Hampton)
- Zac Claus (Eastern Washington)

Legend

- (C) Team captain
- (S) Suspended
- (I) Ineligible
- (W) Walk-on
- Injured
- Current redshirt

Roster
Last update: 2013-08-01

== Schedule ==
Date time, TV	Opponent	Result	Record	Site (attendance) city, state
Exhibition
Nov 4*; 7:05 pm	Montana Tech	W 98–57		Lawlor Events Center (3,023); Reno, NV
Regular season
Nov 8*; 7:05 pm	Pacific	L 78–80	0–1	Lawlor Events Center (5,936); Reno, NV
Nov 12*; 7:00 pm	at Cal Poly	W 60–58	1–1	Mott Gym (1,502); San Luis Obispo, CA
Nov 15*; 7:00 pm	at San Francisco	W 92–90	2–1	War Memorial Gymnasium (2,391); San Francisco, CA
Nov 18*; 7:00 pm	at Cal State Bakersfield	L 66–74	2–2	Rabobank Arena (1,612); Bakersfield, CA
Nov 22*; 7:05 pm	Chattanooga; Las Vegas Invitational	W 83–81	3–2	Lawlor Events Center (5,883); Reno, NV
Nov 24*; 3:05 pm	Morehead State; Las Vegas Invitational	L 58–63	3–3	Lawlor Events Center (5,133); Reno, NV
Nov 28*; 4:30 pm, ESPN3	vs. No. 19 UCLA; Las Vegas Invitational	L 84–105	3–4	Orleans Arena (2,250); Paradise, NV
Nov 29*; 5:30 pm, ESPN3	vs. Missouri; Las Vegas Invitational	L 70–83	3–5	Orleans Arena (2,520); Paradise, NV
Dec 7*; 7:00 pm	at UC Davis	W 87–81 ^{OT}	4–5	The Pavilion (2,422); Davis, CA
Dec 10*; 8:00 pm, P12N	at California	L 84–92	4–6	Haas Pavilion (8,679); Berkeley, CA
Dec 14*; 3:05 pm	Nebraska–Omaha	L 80–82	4–7	Lawlor Events Center (5,052); Reno, NV
Dec 22*; 1:05 pm	Iona	W 80–72	5–7	Lawlor Events Center (5,219); Reno, NV
Dec 28*; 7:05 pm	Long Beach State	L 77–80 ^{OT}	5–8	Lawlor Events Center (7,141); Reno, NV
Jan 1; 7:00 pm	at San Jose State	W 62–50	6–8 (1–0)	Event Center Arena (1,435); San Jose, CA
Jan 4; 3:05 pm, RTRM	Wyoming	W 61–58	7–8 (2–0)	Lawlor Events Center (5,740); Reno, NV
Jan 8; 6:15 pm, CBSSN	at UNLV	W 74–71	8–8 (3–0)	Thomas & Mack Center (13,741); Paradise, NV
Jan 11; 5:05 pm	Utah State	W 62–54	9–8 (4–0)	Lawlor Events Center (6,142); Reno, NV
Jan 14; 7:05 pm	Boise State	L 65–74	9–9 (4–1)	Lawlor Events Center (8,669); Reno, NV
Jan 22; 7:00 pm	at Fresno State	W 96–86	10–9 (5–1)	Save Mart Center (5,815); Fresno, CA
Jan 25; 1:00 pm	at Wyoming	L 62–64 ^{OT}	10–10 (5–2)	Arena-Auditorium (6,944); Laramie, WY
Jan 29; 7:05 pm	Colorado State	W 76–67	11–10 (6–2)	Lawlor Events Center (6,076); Reno, NV
Feb 1; 3:05 pm	Air Force	W 69–56 ^{OT}	12–10 (7–2)	Lawlor Events Center (6,376); Reno, NV
Feb 5; 6:05 pm, RTRM	at Utah State	L 75–83	12–11 (7–3)	Smith Spectrum (9,950); Logan, UT
Feb 8; 7:00 pm, ESPN3	at No. 5 San Diego State	L 58–73	12–12 (7–4)	Viejas Arena (12,414); San Diego, CA
Feb 12; 7:05 pm	Fresno State	L 67–75	12–13 (7–5)	Lawlor Events Center (6,060); Reno, NV
Feb 15; 3:05 pm, CBSSN	at New Mexico	L 72–90	12–14 (7–6)	The Pit (15,411); Albuquerque, NM
Feb 18; 7:05 pm	San Jose State	L 64–66	12–15 (7–7)	Lawlor Events Center (5,994); Reno, NV
Feb 22; 1:00 pm	at Air Force	W 75–56	13–15 (8–7)	Clune Arena (2,485); Colorado Springs, CO
Mar 2; 3:05 pm, ESPN3	No. 25 New Mexico	L 58–72	13–16 (8–8)	Lawlor Events Center (7,259); Reno, NV
Mar 5; 6:00 pm	at Boise State	W 83–81 ^{2OT}	14–16 (9–8)	Taco Bell Arena (6,892); Boise, ID
Mar 8; 7:05 pm, ESPN3	UNLV	W 76–72	15–16 (10–8)	Lawlor Events Center (10,317); Reno, NV
Mountain West tournament
Mar 13; 8:30 pm, CBSSN	vs. Boise State; Quarterfinals	L 62–75	15–17	Thomas & Mack Center (10,645); Paradise, NV
*Non-conference game. ^{#}Rankings from AP Poll. (#) Tournament seedings in parentheses. All times are in Pacific Time.
