= Dakarai Allen =

American basketball player (born 1995)

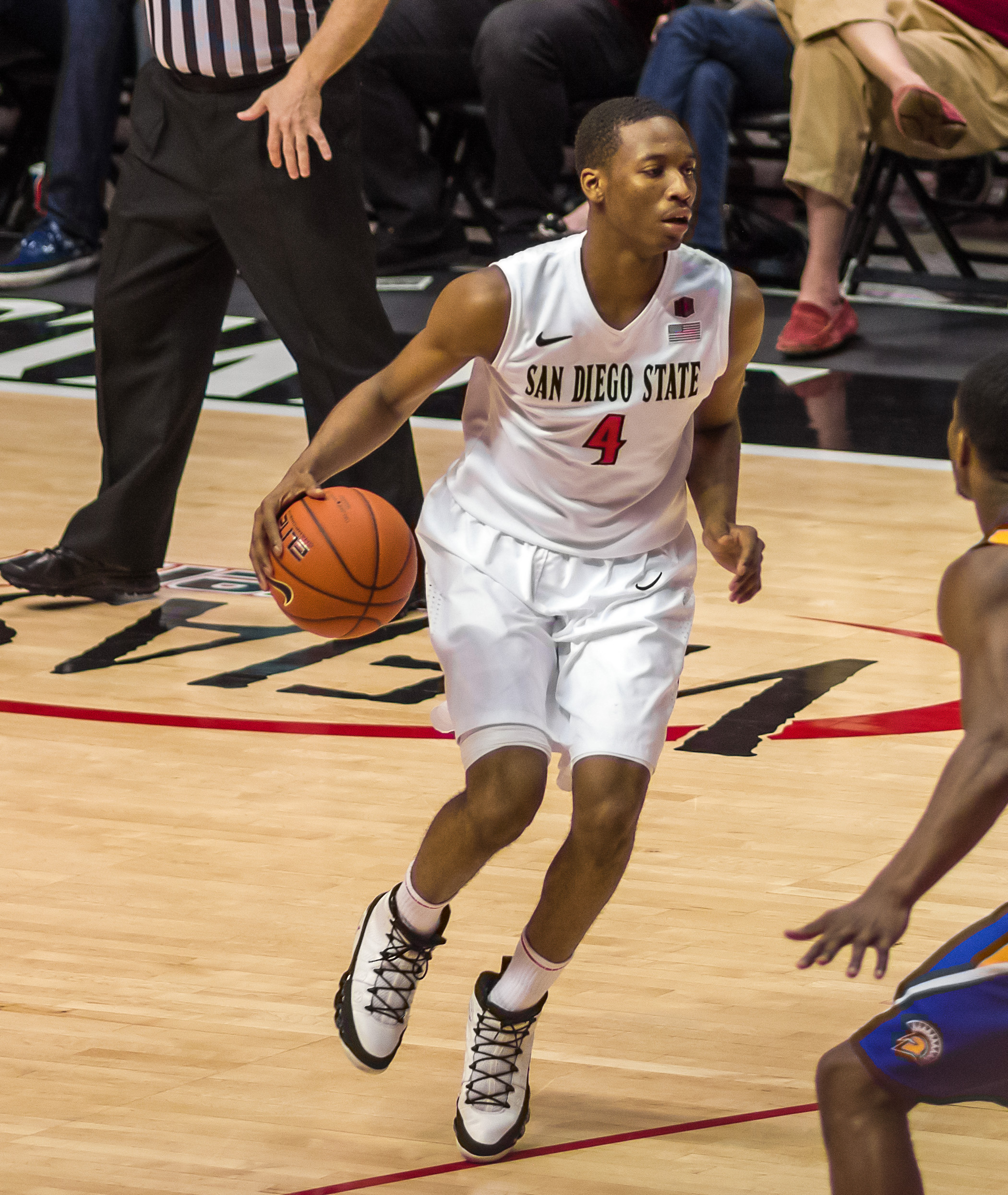
- Allen with the San Diego State Aztecs in 2014

Personal information
- Born: February 4, 1995 (age 31) Sacramento, California, U.S.
- Listed height: 6 ft 5 in (1.96 m)
- Listed weight: 193 lb (88 kg)

Career information
- High school: Sheldon (Sacramento, California)
- College: San Diego State (2013–2017)
- NBA draft: 2017: undrafted
- Playing career: 2017–2022
- Position: Shooting guard

Career history
- 2017–2018: Salt Lake City Stars
- 2018–2019: Agua Caliente Clippers
- 2019–2020: Grand Rapids Drive
- 2021: Salt Lake City Stars
- 2021–2022: NBA G League Ignite
- Stats at Basketball Reference

Dakarai Dupree Lorenzo Allen (born February 4, 1995) is an American former professional basketball player He played college basketball for the San Diego State Aztecs.

== High school career ==
Allen attended Sheldon High School in Sacramento, California, where he was a standout four-year varsity basketball player.

== College career ==
In September 2012 during his senior year in high school, Allen committed to play basketball for the San Diego State University Aztecs after high school. During the high school recruiting process, he received offers to play basketball from every Pac-12 Conference college and many other big colleges in the Western United States.

Through his first two seasons with the Aztecs (2013–14 and 2014–15), Allen was primarily on the bench. He started just one game out of the 62 total games he played, averaging 2.5 points and 11.3 minutes per contest.

During his junior year (2015–16), Allen enjoyed an expanded role with more minutes, and greater success. As the team's sixth-leading scorer and starting 17 of 38 games, he was mainly in the team's sixth man role. He averaged 6.2 points, 2.7 rebounds, and 1.2 assists per game, while nearly doubling his minutes from the previous two seasons with 22.2 per game.

For his senior year (2016–17), he became a full-fledged starter, being the team's only player to start all 33 games. He averaged 8.3 points per game to go along with 4.2 rebounds and 1.4 assists in 28.2 minutes. At the end of the season in 2017, the league's head coaches named Allen the Mountain West Defensive Player of the Year due to his skillfully tenacious defense, as evidenced by his 39 steals, 29 blocks, and 85 defensive rebounds that season. His defensive play has also been aided by his unusually long wingspan (7'1") in proportion to his height (6'5").

== Professional career ==
=== Salt Lake City Stars (2017–2018) ===
After graduating from college, Allen went undrafted in the 2017 NBA draft, making him an unrestricted free agent. Later in 2017, he made it onto the Salt Lake City Stars team via a local tryout prior to the start of the 2017-18 NBA G League season. The team waived him on January 17, 2018.

=== Agua Caliente Clippers (2018–2019) ===
Eleven days later on January 28, 2018, the Agua Caliente Clippers picked up Allen via the G League available player pool. On February 11, 2018, in a game against the Northern Arizona Suns, Allen posted a career-high 22 points in a 113–109 loss.

=== Grand Rapids Drive (2019–2020) ===
On January 8, 2019, the Grand Rapids Drive acquired Allen from the Agua Caliente Clippers in a trade. During the 2019–20 season, Allen averaged 7.9 points, 3.2 rebounds and 2.6 assists per game.

=== Return to Salt Lake City (2021) ===
On February 14, 2021, the Salt Lake City Stars acquired Allen from the available player pool.

=== NBA G League Ignite (2021–2022) ===
On October 28, 2021, Allen signed with the NBA G League Ignite.

== Personal life ==
Dakarai's uncle is Larry Allen, a former NFL offensive lineman, Super Bowl XXX champion, and 11-time Pro Bowler who was inducted into the Pro Football Hall of Fame in 2013.

In a 2015 radio interview on the "Scott and BR Show" hosted by Scott Kaplan and Billy Ray Smith Jr. on XEPRS-AM "The Mighty 1090", Allen revealed that the meaning of his given name "Dakarai" is "happiness" in Swahili.

In July 2024 Allen sued the Elk Grove, California Police Department, accusing them of breaking his knee with baton strikes after he was found sleeping in a car.
