= 2014 Mountain West Conference men's basketball tournament =

Basketball tournament Held in 2014 at Las Vegas

- Classification: Division I
- Season: 2013–14
- Teams: 11
- Site: Thomas & Mack Center; Paradise, NV
- Champions: New Mexico (4th title)
- Winning coach: Craig Neal (1st title)
- MVP: Cameron Bairstow (New Mexico)
- Television: CBSSN, CBS

2013–14 Mountain West Conference men's basketball standings
	Conf.				Overall
Team	W		L	PCT	W		L	PCT
No. 13 San Diego State	16	–	2	.889	31	–	5	.861
No. 17 New Mexico †	15	–	3	.833	27	–	7	.794
UNLV	10	–	8	.556	20	–	13	.606
Nevada	10	–	8	.556	15	–	17	.469
Boise State	9	–	9	.500	21	–	13	.618
Wyoming	9	–	9	.500	18	–	15	.545
Fresno State	9	–	9	.500	21	–	18	.538
Utah State	7	–	11	.389	18	–	14	.563
Colorado State	7	–	11	.389	16	–	16	.500
Air Force	6	–	12	.333	12	–	18	.400
San Jose State	1	–	17	.056	7	–	24	.226
† 2014 MWC tournament winner Rankings from AP poll

The 2014 Mountain West Conference men's basketball tournament was held on March 12–15, 2014 at the Thomas & Mack Center in Las Vegas, Nevada. With San Jose State and Utah State added to the MWC, the MWC had an 11-team tournament for 2014. The top five seeds got a first round bye. For the second year in a row, the first-round games were online, quarterfinals and semifinals games were on the CBS Sports Network and the championship game was televised on CBS. The tournament champion received the Mountain West's automatic bid to the 2014 NCAA tournament.

== Seeds ==
Teams were seeded by conference record, with a ties broken by record between the tied teams followed by record against the regular-season champion, if necessary. The top five seeds received first round byes.

Seed	School	Conference	Overall	Tiebreaker
1	San Diego State	16–2	27–4	
2	New Mexico	15–3	26–6	
3	Nevada	10–8	15–17	2–0 vs. UNLV
4	UNLV	10–8	20–13	0–2 vs. Nevada
5	Wyoming	9–9	18–13	2–2 vs Boise/Fresno; 1–0 vs. SDSU
6	Boise State	9–9	21–13	2–2 vs Wyoming/Fresno; 0–2 vs SDSU; 1–1 vs. UNM
7	Fresno State	9–9	17–16	2–2 vs Boise/Wyoming; 0–2 vs. SDSU; 0–1 vs. UNM
8	Utah State	7–11	18–14	2–0 vs Colorado State
9	Colorado State	7–11	16–17	0–2 vs Utah State
10	Air Force	6–12	12–19	
11	San Jose State	1–17	7–25	

== Schedule ==
Game	Time*	Matchup^{#}	Television
First round – Wednesday, March 12
1	2:00 pm	#8 Utah State vs. #9 Colorado State	MWN
2	4:30 pm	#7 Fresno State vs. #10 Air Force	MWN
3	7:00 pm	#6 Boise State vs. #11 San Jose State	MWN
Quarterfinals – Thursday, March 13
4	Noon	#1 San Diego State vs. #8 Utah State	CBSSN
5	2:30 pm	#4 UNLV vs. #5 Wyoming	CBSSN
6	6:00 pm	#2 New Mexico vs. #7 Fresno State	CBSSN
7	8:30 pm	#3 Nevada vs. #6 Boise State	CBSSN
Semifinals – Friday, March 14
8	6:00 pm	#1 San Diego State vs. #4 UNLV	CBSSN
9	8:30 pm	#2 New Mexico vs. #6 Boise State	CBSSN
Championship – Saturday, March 15
10	3:00 pm	#1 San Diego State vs. #2 New Mexico	CBS
*Game times in PT. #-Rankings denote tournament seeding.

== Bracket ==
First round Wednesday, March 12
8	Utah State	73
9	Colorado State	69
7	Fresno State	61
10	Air Force	59
6	Boise State	83
11	San Jose State	52

Quarterfinals; Thursday, March 13; CBSSN
1	San Diego State	73
8	Utah State	39
4	UNLV	71
5	Wyoming	67
2	New Mexico	93
7	Fresno State	77
3	Nevada	62
6	Boise State	75

Semifinals; Friday, March 14; CBSSN
1	San Diego State	59
4	UNLV	51
2	New Mexico	70
6	Boise State	67

Championship; Saturday, March 15; CBS
1	San Diego State	58
2	New Mexico	64
