= 2013–14 San Jose State Spartans men's basketball team =

American college basketball season

2013–14 San Jose State Spartans men's basketball
- Conference: Mountain West Conference
- Record: 7–24 (1–17 MWC)
- Head coach: Dave Wojcik (1st season)
- Assistant coaches: Chris Brazelton; Jack Kennedy; Omar Lowery
- Home arena: Event Center Arena

2013–14 Mountain West Conference men's basketball standings
	Conf.				Overall
Team	W		L	PCT	W		L	PCT
No. 13 San Diego State	16	–	2	.889	31	–	5	.861
No. 17 New Mexico †	15	–	3	.833	27	–	7	.794
UNLV	10	–	8	.556	20	–	13	.606
Nevada	10	–	8	.556	15	–	17	.469
Boise State	9	–	9	.500	21	–	13	.618
Wyoming	9	–	9	.500	18	–	15	.545
Fresno State	9	–	9	.500	21	–	18	.538
Utah State	7	–	11	.389	18	–	14	.563
Colorado State	7	–	11	.389	16	–	16	.500
Air Force	6	–	12	.333	12	–	18	.400
San Jose State	1	–	17	.056	7	–	24	.226
† 2014 MWC tournament winner Rankings from AP poll

The 2013–14 San Jose State Spartans men's basketball team representsed San Jose State University during the 2013–14 NCAA Division I men's basketball season. The Spartans, led by first year head coach Dave Wojcik, played their home games at the Event Center Arena and were first year members of the Mountain West Conference. They finished the season 7–24, 1–17 in Mountain West play to finish in last place. They lost in the first round of the Mountain West Conference tournament to Boise State.

== Preseason roster changes ==
=== Departures ===
Many players from the previous season left with eligibility remaining. Athletic director Gene Bleymaier explained in 2014: "Last year, we were faced with a situation that needed to be dealt with in a major fashion. The coaching staff was not retained, and several players were not invited back for the 2013-14 season. Only four players returned from the 2012-13 team."

Name	Number	Pos.	Height	Weight	Year	Hometown	Notes
Aalim Moor	4	G	6'3"	194	Senior	Oakland, CA	Graduated
Xavier Jones	5	G	6'4"	205	Junior	Gary, IN	Transferred to Florida Southern
Stephon Smith	10	F	6'8"	260	Sophomore	Dallas, TX	Transferred to Northwood (FL)
David Andoh	22	F	6'7"	200	Freshman	San Jose, CA	Transferred to Merritt CC
Chris Jones	23	G	6'4"	205	Senior	Hayward, CA	Graduated
LaVanne Pennington	24	G	6'4"	180	Senior	San Bernardino, CA	Graduated
Nick Grieves	30	G	6'3"	160	Sophomore	Aptos, CA	Transferred to Cal State East Bay
Louis Garrett	32	F	6'6"	215	Junior	St. George, UT	Transferred to Dixie State
James Kinney	33	G	6'2"	180	Senior	Champaign, IL	Graduated
Alex Brown	44	C	6'11"	210	Junior	Colp, IL	Transferred to Kentucky Wesleyan

=== Incoming transfers ===
Name	Number	Pos.	Height	Weight	Year	Hometown	Previous School
Jordan Baker*	11	G	6'4"	190	Junior	Tempe, AZ	Pepperdine
Frank Rogers*	14	F	6'9"	230	Junior	Salinas, CA	San Francisco
Devante Wilson	22	G	6'4"	215	Junior	Muskogee, OK	Lee CC

*Redshirted this season per NCAA transfer rules.

=== Recruiting ===
College recruiting
Name	Hometown	School	Height	Weight	Commit date
Jalen James; PG	Chicago, IL	La Lumiere School	6 ft 3 in (1.91 m)	175 lb (79 kg)	Apr 20, 2013
Jalen James; PG	Recruit ratings: Scout: Rivals: (72)				
Rashad Muhammad; SG	Las Vegas, NV	Bishop Gorman HS	6 ft 4 in (1.93 m)	170 lb (77 kg)	Apr 20, 2013
Rashad Muhammad; SG	Recruit ratings: Scout: Rivals: (70)				
Brandon Mitchell; SF	Memphis, TN	Ridgeway HS	6 ft 5 in (1.96 m)	200 lb (91 kg)	May 6, 2013
Brandon Mitchell; SF	Recruit ratings: Scout: Rivals: (N/A)				
Matt Pollard; C	Houston, TX	Shooting 4 Greatness Academy	6 ft 11 in (2.11 m)	240 lb (110 kg)	May 7, 2013
Matt Pollard; C	Recruit ratings: Scout: Rivals: (N/A)				
Isaac Thornton; SG	San Antonio, TX	Sam Houston HS	6 ft 3 in (1.91 m)	165 lb (75 kg)	May 3, 2013
Isaac Thornton; SG	Recruit ratings: Scout: Rivals: (N/A)				
Devante Wilson; SG	Muskogee, OK	Lee CC	6 ft 4 in (1.93 m)	200 lb (91 kg)	May 9, 2013
Devante Wilson; SG	Recruit ratings: Scout: Rivals: (N/A)				
Overall recruit ranking: Scout: – Rivals: –
Note: In many cases, Scout, Rivals, 247Sports, On3, and ESPN may conflict in their listings of height and weight.; In these cases, the average was taken. ESPN grades are on a 100-point scale.; Sources: "San Jose State Commit List for 2013". Rivals. Archived from the original on June 5, 2013.; "Men's Basketball Recruiting". Scout.; "ESPN – San Jose State Spartans Basketball Recruiting 2013". ESPN.; "Scout.com Team Recruiting Rankings". Scout.; "2013 Team Ranking". Rivals.

== Roster ==
2013–14 San Jose State Spartans men's basketball team
Players
Coaches

Pos.	#	Name	Height	Weight	Year	Previous school	Hometown
G	0	Rashad Muhammad	6 ft 6 in (1.98 m)	180 lb (82 kg)	Fr	Bishop Gorman HS	Las Vegas, NV
G	1	D.J. Brown	6 ft 2 in (1.88 m)	185 lb (84 kg)	RS Jr	Chino Hills HS	Los Angeles, CA
F	2	Jaleel Williams	6 ft 7 in (2.01 m)	220 lb (100 kg)	Jr	Ellison HS	Killeen, TX
F	4	Brandon Mitchell	6 ft 7 in (2.01 m)	210 lb (95 kg)	Fr	Ridgeway HS	Memphis, TN
G	5	Dylan Alexander (W)	6 ft 4 in (1.93 m)	190 lb (86 kg)	Fr	Weston Ranch HS	Stockton, CA
G	11	Jordan Baker (I) (redshirt)	6 ft 4 in (1.93 m)	190 lb (86 kg)	Jr	Pepperdine U.	Tempe, AZ
G	12	Jalen James	6 ft 3 in (1.91 m)	170 lb (77 kg)	Fr	La Lumiere School	Chicago, IL
F	14	Frank Rogers (I) (redshirt)	6 ft 9 in (2.06 m)	230 lb (104 kg)	Jr	U. of San Francisco	Salinas, CA
F	15	Chris Cunningham	6 ft 9 in (2.06 m)	240 lb (109 kg)	RS Sr	Santa Clara U.	Pomona, CA
G	20	Isaac Thornton	6 ft 3 in (1.91 m)	170 lb (77 kg)	Fr	Sam Houston HS	San Antonio, TX
C	21	Mike VanKirk	7 ft 1 in (2.16 m)	240 lb (109 kg)	So	La Jolla Prep	Palmdale, CA
G	22	Devante Wilson	6 ft 4 in (1.93 m)	215 lb (98 kg)	Jr	Lee CC	Muskogee, OK
C	35	Matt Pollard	7 ft 0 in (2.13 m)	265 lb (120 kg)	Fr	Kashmere HS	Houston, TX

Head coach

- Dave Wojcik (Loyola)

Assistant coach(es)

- Chris Brazelton (Fresno State)
- Jack Kennedy (Grinnell)
- Omar Lowery (Concordia)

Legend

- (C) Team captain
- (S) Suspended
- (I) Ineligible
- (W) Walk-on
- Injured
- Current redshirt

Roster

== Schedule ==
Date time, TV	Rank^{#}	Opponent^{#}	Result	Record	Site (attendance) city, state
Exhibition
Nov 4*; 7:00 pm		Cal State Monterey Bay	L 69–78		Event Center Arena (1,321); San Jose, CA
Nov 6*; 7:00 pm		Pacific Union	W 93–42		Event Center Arena (1,139); San Jose, CA
Regular season
Nov 12*; 8:00 pm		at Santa Clara	L 77–89	0–1	Leavey Center (1,456); Santa Clara, CA
Nov 15*; 3:30 pm		vs. Milwaukee; NIU Invitational	L 61–64	0–2	Convocation Center (1,113); DeKalb, IL
Nov 16*; 6:00 pm		at Northern Illinois; NIU Invitational	L 59–60	0–3	Convocation Center (753); DeKalb, IL
Nov 17*; 11:00 am		vs. James Madison; NIU Invitational	L 66–79	0–4	Convocation Center (474); DeKalb, IL
Nov 20*; 7:00 pm		at Pepperdine	W 83–77	1–4	Firestone Fieldhouse (847); Malibu, CA
Nov 23*; 12:30 pm		Cal State Fullerton	W 81–59	2–4	Event Center Arena (1,284); San Jose, CA
Nov 27*; 7:00 pm		at Portland	L 69–86	2–5	Chiles Center (1,036); Portland, OR
Nov 30*; 6:00 pm		at Weber State	L 55–72	2–6	Dee Events Center (5,584); Ogden, UT
Dec 7*; 3:00 pm, ESPN3		at Houston	W 72–68	3–6	Hofheinz Pavilion (3,105); Houston, TX
Dec 18*; 8:00 pm		UC Davis	W 89–85 ^{3OT}	4–6	Event Center Arena (1,229); San Jose, CA
Dec 21*; 12:00 pm		Westminster	W 73–66	5–6	Event Center Arena (1,338); San Jose, CA
Dec 28*; 2:00 pm		Pacifica College	W 87–59	6–6	Event Center Arena (1,126); San Jose, CA
Jan 1; 7:00 pm		Nevada	L 50–62	6–7 (0–1)	Event Center Arena (1,435); San Jose, CA
Jan 4; 6:00 pm		at Utah State	L 67–86	6–8 (0–2)	Smith Spectrum (10,015); Logan, UT
Jan 8; 7:00 pm		Colorado State	L 64–66	6–9 (0–3)	Event Center Arena (1,513); San Jose, CA
Jan 11; 7:05 pm, RTRM		New Mexico	L 65–69	6–10 (0–4)	Event Center Arena (2,078); San Jose, CA
Jan 15; 6:00 pm		at Air Force	L 62–77	6–11 (0–5)	Clune Arena (1,695); Colorado Springs, CO
Jan 18; 1:00 pm		at Wyoming	L 56–67	6–12 (0–6)	Arena-Auditorium (5,673); Laramie, WY
Jan 22; 7:00 pm, ESPN3		No. 7 San Diego State	L 50–75	6–13 (0–7)	Event Center Arena (4,117); San Jose, CA
Jan 25; 4:05 pm, RTRM		at Boise State	L 55–76	6–14 (0–8)	Taco Bell Arena (6,845); Boise, ID
Jan 29; 7:00 pm, ESPN3		UNLV	L 46–70	6–15 (0–9)	Event Center Arena (2,643); San Jose, CA
Feb 1; 5:05 pm, RTRM		at New Mexico	L 47–72	6–16 (0–10)	The Pit (15,411); Albuquerque, NM
Feb 8; 4:00 pm		at Fresno State	L 56–82	6–17 (0–11)	Save Mart Center (6,784); Fresno, CA
Feb 12; 7:00 pm, RTRM		Air Force	L 48–51	6–18 (0–12)	Event Center Arena (1,326); San Jose, CA
Feb 15; 2:00 pm		Wyoming	L 38–46	6–19 (0–13)	Event Center Arena (1,153); San Jose, CA
Feb 18; 7:05 pm		at Nevada	W 66–64	7–19 (1–13)	Lawlor Events Center (5,994); Reno, NV
Feb 25; 8:05 pm, CBSSN		at No. 13 San Diego State	L 64–90	7–20 (1–14)	Viejas Arena (12,414); San Diego, CA
Mar 1; 5:05 pm, RTRM		Utah State	L 58–75	7–21 (1–15)	Event Center Arena (1,343); San Jose, CA
Mar 5; 6:00 pm		at Colorado State	L 66–78	7–22 (1–16)	Moby Arena (4,130); Fort Collins, CO
Mar 8; 7:00 pm		Fresno State	L 56–69	7–23 (1–17)	Event Center Arena (2,451); San Jose, CA
Mountain West tournament
Mar 12; 7:00 pm	(11)	vs. (6) Boise State; First round	L 52–83	7–24	Thomas & Mack Center (5,824); Paradise, NV
*Non-conference game. ^{#}Rankings from AP Poll. (#) Tournament seedings in parentheses. All times are in Pacific Time.
