= 2013–14 UNLV Runnin' Rebels basketball team =

American college basketball season

2013–14 UNLV Runnin' Rebels basketball

Las Vegas Classic Champions
- Conference: Mountain West Conference
- Record: 20–13 (10–8 Mountain West)
- Head coach: Dave Rice
- Assistant coaches: Heath Schroyer; Stacey Augmon; Todd Simon
- Home arena: Thomas & Mack Center

2013–14 Mountain West Conference men's basketball standings
	Conf.				Overall
Team	W		L	PCT	W		L	PCT
No. 13 San Diego State	16	–	2	.889	31	–	5	.861
No. 17 New Mexico †	15	–	3	.833	27	–	7	.794
UNLV	10	–	8	.556	20	–	13	.606
Nevada	10	–	8	.556	15	–	17	.469
Boise State	9	–	9	.500	21	–	13	.618
Wyoming	9	–	9	.500	18	–	15	.545
Fresno State	9	–	9	.500	21	–	18	.538
Utah State	7	–	11	.389	18	–	14	.563
Colorado State	7	–	11	.389	16	–	16	.500
Air Force	6	–	12	.333	12	–	18	.400
San Jose State	1	–	17	.056	7	–	24	.226
† 2014 MWC tournament winner Rankings from AP poll

The 2013–14 UNLV Runnin' Rebels basketball team represented the University of Nevada, Las Vegas during the 2013–14 NCAA Division I men's basketball season. The team was coached by Dave Rice, in his third year with the Runnin' Rebels. They played their home games at the Thomas & Mack Center on UNLV's main campus in Paradise, Nevada and were a member of the Mountain West Conference. They finished the season 20–13, 10–8 in Mountain West play to finish in a tie for third place. They advanced to the semifinals of the Mountain West Conference tournament to San Diego State. They did not play in a postseason tournament for the first time since 2009.

== Departures ==
Name	Number	Pos.	Height	Weight	Year	Hometown	Notes
Savon Goodman	0	F	6'6"	215	Sophomore	Philadelphia, PA	Voluntarily left team in preseason pending a court hearing for burglary
Quintrell Thomas	1	F	6'8"	245	RS Senior	Newark, NJ	Graduated
Anthony Marshall	3	G	6'3"	200	Senior	Las Vegas, NV	Graduated
Katin Reinhardt	5	G	6'5"	210	Freshman	Dana Point, CA	Transfer
Anthony Bennett	15	F	6'8"	240	Freshman	Brampton, ON	NBA draft
Justin Hawkins	31	G	6'3"	190	Senior	Los Angeles, CA	Graduated
Mike Moser	43	F	6'8"	210	Junior	Portland, OR	Transfer

== Recruiting ==
College recruiting information
Name	Hometown	School	Height	Weight	Commit date
Christian Wood; PF	Palmdale, CA	Findlay Prep	6 ft 10 in (2.08 m)	200 lb (91 kg)	Jul 1, 2011
Christian Wood; PF	Recruit ratings: Scout: Rivals: (85)				
Kendall Smith; PG	Antioch, CA	Deer Valley High School	6 ft 2 in (1.88 m)	165 lb (75 kg)	Jan 4, 2013
Kendall Smith; PG	Recruit ratings: Scout: Rivals: (82)				
Jelan Kendrick; SG	Atlanta, GA	Indian Hills C.C.	6 ft 6 in (1.98 m)	195 lb (88 kg)	Oct 14, 2012
Jelan Kendrick; SG	Recruit ratings: Scout: Rivals: (N/A)				
DeVille Smith; PG	Jackson, MS	Southwest Mississippi C.C.	5 ft 11 in (1.80 m)	175 lb (79 kg)	Mar 10, 2013
DeVille Smith; PG	Recruit ratings: Scout: Rivals: (N/A)				
Overall recruit ranking: Scout: – Rivals: –
Note: In many cases, Scout, Rivals, 247Sports, On3, and ESPN may conflict in their listings of height and weight.; In these cases, the average was taken. ESPN grades are on a 100-point scale.; Sources: "UNLV Commit List for 2013". Rivals.; "Men's Basketball Recruiting". Scout.; "ESPN – UNLV Runnin' Rebels Basketball Recruiting 2013". ESPN.; "Scout.com Team Recruiting Rankings". Scout.; "2013 Team Ranking". Rivals.

== Roster ==
2013–14 UNLV Runnin' Rebels men's basketball team
Players
Coaches

Pos.	#	Name	Height	Weight	Year	Previous school	Hometown
F	1	Roscoe Smith	6 ft 8 in (2.03 m)	215 lb (98 kg)	RS Jr	Connecticut	Baltimore, MD
F	2	Khem Birch	6 ft 9 in (2.06 m)	220 lb (100 kg)	RS Jr	Pittsburgh	Montreal, QC
G	3	Kevin Olekaibe	6 ft 2 in (1.88 m)	180 lb (82 kg)	Sr	Fresno State	Las Vegas, NV
F	5	Christian Wood	6 ft 10 in (2.08 m)	210 lb (95 kg)	Fr	Findlay Prep	Los Angeles, CA
F	11	Carlos Lopez-Sosa	6 ft 11 in (2.11 m)	225 lb (102 kg)	RS Sr	Findlay Prep	Lajas, PR
G	12	Barry Cheaney	6 ft 1 in (1.85 m)	165 lb (75 kg)	Jr	Los Osos HS	Corona, CA
G	13	Bryce Dejean-Jones	6 ft 5 in (1.96 m)	210 lb (95 kg)	RS Jr	USC	Los Angeles, CA
G	15	Kendall Smith	6 ft 2 in (1.88 m)	180 lb (82 kg)	Fr	Deer Valley HS	Antioch, CA
G	20	Charles Rushman	6 ft 3 in (1.91 m)	185 lb (84 kg)	RS Fr	St. John's Prep	Milwaukee, WI
G	22	Jelan Kendrick	6 ft 6 in (1.98 m)	210 lb (95 kg)	Jr	Indian Hills CC	Atlanta, GA
F	24	Demetris Morant	6 ft 9 in (2.06 m)	210 lb (95 kg)	RS Fr	Bishop Gorman HS	Las Vegas, NV
G	30	Dantley Walker	5 ft 11 in (1.8 m)	165 lb (75 kg)	Fr	Lincoln County HS	Panaca, NV
G	33	Deville Smith	6 ft 0 in (1.83 m)	175 lb (79 kg)	Jr	Southwest Mississippi CC	Jackson, MS

Head coach

- Dave Rice (UNLV)

Assistant coach(es)

- Heath Schroyer (Armstrong Atlantic State)
- Stacey Augmon (UNLV)
- Todd Simon

Legend

- (C) Team captain
- (S) Suspended
- (I) Ineligible
- (W) Walk-on
- Injured
- Current redshirt

Roster
Last update: 2013-08-17

== Schedule and results ==
Date time, TV	Opponent	Result	Record	Site (attendance) city, state
Exhibition
Nov 1*; 8:00 pm	Dixie State	L 70–71	–	Thomas & Mack Center (12,076); Paradise, NV
Nov 5*; 7:00 pm	Adams State	W 72–67	–	Thomas & Mack Center (11,275); Paradise, NV
Regular season
Nov 8*; 7:30 pm	Portland State	W 67–48	1–0	Thomas & Mack Center (13,148); Paradise, NV
Nov 12*; 7:00 pm, Cox 96	UC Santa Barbara	L 65–86	1–1	Thomas & Mack Center (12,242); Paradise, NV
Nov 15*; 7:00 pm	Nebraska–Omaha	W 73–70	2–1	Thomas & Mack Center (12,638); Paradise, NV
Nov 19*; 7:05 pm, CBSSN	Arizona State	L 80–86	2–2	Thomas & Mack Center (12,915); Paradise, NV
Nov 26*; 7:45 pm, CBSSN	Illinois	L 59–61	2–3	Thomas & Mack Center (13,747); Paradise, NV
Nov 30*; 7:00 pm, Cox 96	Tennessee–Martin	W 85–55	3–3	Thomas & Mack Center (12,397); Paradise, NV
Dec 7*; 2:15 pm, ESPN2	at No. 2 Arizona	L 58–63	3–4	McKale Center (14,545); Tucson, AZ
Dec 14*; 4:00 pm	at Southern Utah	W 73–51	4–4	Centrum Arena (3,505); Cedar City, UT
Dec 18*; 7:00 pm	Radford; Las Vegas Classic	W 81–62	5–4	Thomas & Mack Center (11,547); Paradise, NV
Dec 20*; 7:00 pm	Sacred Heart; Las Vegas Classic	W 82–50	6–4	Thomas & Mack Center (12,235); Paradise, NV
Dec 22*; 7:30 pm	vs. Santa Clara; Las Vegas Classic Semifinals	W 92–71	7–4	Orleans Arena (4,376); Paradise, NV
Dec 23*; 7:30 pm, CBSSN	vs. Mississippi State; Las Vegas Classic Finals	W 82–66	8–4	Orleans Arena (3,618); Paradise, NV
Dec 28*; 7:00 pm, Cox 96	Cal State Fullerton	W 83–64	9–4	Thomas & Mack Center (12,551); Paradise, NV
Jan 1; 12:00 pm, ESPN3	at Fresno State	W 75–62	10–4 (1–0)	Save Mart Center (5,968); Fresno, CA
Jan 4; 7:00 pm, Cox 96	Air Force	L 68–75	10–5 (1–1)	Thomas & Mack Center (12,325); Paradise, NV
Jan 8; 6:15 pm, CBSSN	Nevada	L 71–74	10–6 (1–2)	Thomas & Mack Center (13,741); Paradise, NV
Jan 15; 6:05 pm, CBSSN	at New Mexico	W 76–73	11–6 (2–2)	The Pit (15,351); Albuquerque, NM
Jan 18; 3:05 pm, CBSSN	at No. 10 San Diego State	L 52–63	11–7 (2–3)	Viejas Arena (12,414); San Diego, CA
Jan 22; 8:05 pm, CBSSN	Utah State	W 62–42	12–7 (3–3)	Thomas & Mack Center (12,919); Paradise, NV
Jan 25; 7:05 pm, CBSSN	Fresno State	W 75–73 ^{OT}	13–7 (4–3)	Thomas & Mack Center (13,849); Paradise, NV
Jan 29; 7:00 pm, ESPN3	at San Jose State	W 70–46	14–7 (5–3)	Event Center Arena (2,643); San Jose, CA
Feb 1; 5:05 pm, CBSSN	Boise State	W 73–69	15–7 (6–3)	Thomas & Mack Center (13,982); Paradise, NV
Feb 5; 8:05 pm, ESPN3	at Colorado State	L 57–75	15–8 (6–4)	Moby Arena (3,702); Fort Collins, CO
Feb 8; 7:00 pm, ESPN3	Wyoming	W 48–46	16–8 (7–4)	Thomas & Mack Center (13,863); Paradise, NV
Feb 15; 1:05 pm, CBSSN	at Utah State	W 73–62	17–8 (8–4)	Smith Spectrum (10,002); Logan, UT
Feb 19; 8:05 pm, ESPN2	New Mexico	L 56–68	17–9 (8–5)	Thomas & Mack Center (13,701); Paradise, NV
Feb 22; 5:05 pm, CBSSN	at Boise State	L 90–91 ^{OT}	17–10 (8–6)	Taco Bell Arena (9,010); Boise, ID
Feb 26; 8:05 pm, CBSSN	Colorado State	W 78–70	18–10 (9–6)	Thomas & Mack Center (13,682); Paradise, NV
Mar 1; 1:00 pm, ESPN3	at Air Force	W 93–67	19–10 (10–6)	Clune Arena (2,362); Colorado Springs, CO
Mar 5; 8:05 pm, CBSSN	No. 10 San Diego State	L 64–73	19–11 (10–7)	Thomas & Mack Center (16,030); Paradise, NV
Mar 8; 8:05 pm, ESPN3	at Nevada	L 72–76	19–12 (10–8)	Lawlor Events Center (10,317); Reno, NV
Mountain West tournament
Mar 13; 2:30 pm, CBSSN	Wyoming; Quarterfinals	W 71–67	20–12	Thomas & Mack Center (9,854); Paradise, NV
Mar 14; 6:00 pm, CBSSN	No. 8 San Diego State; Semifinals	L 51–59	20–13	Thomas & Mack Center (15,135); Paradise, NV
*Non-conference game. ^{#}Rankings from AP Poll. (#) Tournament seedings in parentheses. All times are in Pacific Time.

== See also ==
- 2013–14 UNLV Lady Rebels basketball team
