= 2013–14 New Mexico Lobos men's basketball team =

American college basketball season

2013–14 New Mexico Lobos men's basketball

Mountain West tournament champions

NCAA tournament, round of 64
- Conference: Mountain West Conference

Ranking
- AP: No. 17
- Record: 27–7 (15–3 Mountain West)
- Head coach: Craig Neal (1st season)
- Assistant coaches: Drew Adams; Craig Snow; Lamont Smith
- Home arena: The Pit (Capacity: 15,411)

2013–14 Mountain West Conference men's basketball standings
	Conf.				Overall
Team	W		L	PCT	W		L	PCT
No. 13 San Diego State	16	–	2	.889	31	–	5	.861
No. 17 New Mexico †	15	–	3	.833	27	–	7	.794
UNLV	10	–	8	.556	20	–	13	.606
Nevada	10	–	8	.556	15	–	17	.469
Boise State	9	–	9	.500	21	–	13	.618
Wyoming	9	–	9	.500	18	–	15	.545
Fresno State	9	–	9	.500	21	–	18	.538
Utah State	7	–	11	.389	18	–	14	.563
Colorado State	7	–	11	.389	16	–	16	.500
Air Force	6	–	12	.333	12	–	18	.400
San Jose State	1	–	17	.056	7	–	24	.226
† 2014 MWC tournament winner Rankings from AP poll

The 2013–14 New Mexico Lobos men's basketball team represented the University of New Mexico during the 2013–14 NCAA Division I men's basketball season as a member of the Mountain West Conference. They played their home games at The Pit in Albuquerque, New Mexico. The Lobos were led by first year head coach Craig Neal. They finished the season 27–7, 15–3 in Mountain West play to finish in second place. They were champions of the Mountain West tournament, their third consecutive conference tournament championship, to earn an automatic bid to the NCAA tournament where they lost in the second round to Stanford.

== Off season ==
=== Departures ===
Name	Number	Pos.	Height	Weight	Year	Hometown	Notes
Chad Adams	4	G	6'6"	190	Senior	Albuquerque, NM	Graduated
Jamal Fenton	13	G	5'9"	170	Senior	Houston, TX	Graduated
Tony Snell	21	G	6'7"	200	Junior	Riverside, CA	NBA draft
Kory Alford	24	G	6'3"	185	RS Freshman	Albuquerque, NM	Transferred
Demetrius Walker	40	G	6'3"	190	RS Junior	Fontana, CA	Suspended

=== Incoming transfers ===
Name	Number	Pos.	Height	Weight	Year	Hometown	Notes
Arthur Edwards	5	SF	6'7"	195	Sophomore	Temple Hills, Maryland	Junior college transfer from Northwest Florida State College.
Deshawn Delaney	33	SG	6'5"	190	Junior	Chicago, Illinois	Junior college transfer from Vincennes University.

=== Recruiting ===
College recruiting information
Name	Hometown	School	Height	Weight	Commit date
Cullen Neal; PG	Albuquerque, NM	Eldorado High School	6 ft 4 in (1.93 m)	170 lb (77 kg)	Apr 14, 2013
Cullen Neal; PG	Recruit ratings: Scout: Rivals: ESPN: (82)				
Tim Myles; PF	Rancho Cucamonga, CA	Etiwanda High School	6 ft 7 in (2.01 m)	220 lb (100 kg)	Aug 17, 2012
Tim Myles; PF	Recruit ratings: Scout: Rivals: ESPN: (66)				
Overall recruit ranking:
Note: In many cases, Scout, Rivals, 247Sports, On3, and ESPN may conflict in their listings of height and weight.; In these cases, the average was taken. ESPN grades are on a 100-point scale.; Sources: "2013 Team Ranking". Rivals.

== Roster ==
2013–14 New Mexico Lobos men's basketball team
Players
Coaches

Pos.	#	Name	Height	Weight	Year	Hometown
G	1	Cleveland Thomas	6 ft 3 in (1.91 m)	195 lb (88 kg)	So	Baton Rouge, Louisiana
G	2	Chris Perez	6 ft 0 in (1.83 m)	190 lb (86 kg)	Sr	Corona, California
G	3	Hugh Greenwood	6 ft 3 in (1.91 m)	205 lb (93 kg)	Jr	Hobart, Australia
F	5	Arthur Edwards	6 ft 6 in (1.98 m)	205 lb (93 kg)	So	Temple Hills, Maryland
G	10	Kendall Williams	6 ft 4 in (1.93 m)	180 lb (82 kg)	Sr	Rancho Cucamonga, California
C	11	Obij Aget	7 ft 1 in (2.16 m)	225 lb (102 kg)	Fr	La Porte, Indiana
G/F	12	Devon Williams	6 ft 7 in (2.01 m)	205 lb (93 kg)	RS Fr	Dallas, Texas
G	13	Cullen Neal	6 ft 4 in (1.93 m)	180 lb (82 kg)	Fr	Albuquerque, New Mexico
G	22	Merv Lindsay	6 ft 7 in (2.01 m)	205 lb (93 kg)	RS So	Moreno Valley, California
F	23	Nick Banyard	6 ft 8 in (2.03 m)	205 lb (93 kg)	So	Flower Mound, Texas
F	24	Tim Myles	6 ft 6 in (1.98 m)	225 lb (102 kg)	Fr	Rancho Cucamonga, California
G	33	DeShawn Delaney	6 ft 5 in (1.96 m)	190 lb (86 kg)	Jr	Chicago, Illinois
F	41	Cameron Bairstow	6 ft 9 in (2.06 m)	250 lb (113 kg)	Sr	Brisbane, Australia
C	53	Alex Kirk	7 ft 0 in (2.13 m)	245 lb (111 kg)	RS Jr	Los Alamos, New Mexico

Head coach

- Craig Neal (Georgia Tech)

Assistant coach(es)

- Drew Adams (Tennessee)
- Craig Snow (Evansville)
- Lamont Smith (San Diego)

Legend

- (C) Team captain
- (S) Suspended
- (I) Ineligible
- (W) Walk-on
- Injured
- Current redshirt

Roster

== Schedule and results ==
Date time, TV	Rank^{#}	Opponent^{#}	Result	Record	Site (attendance) city, state
Exhibition
Nov 2*; 7:00 pm	No. 23	Eastern New Mexico	W 87–68		The Pit (14,153); Albuquerque, NM
Nov 6*; 7:00 pm, RTRM	No. 23	Jamestown	W 94–51		The Pit (13,426); Albuquerque, NM
Regular season
Nov 9*; 8:05 pm, RTRM	No. 23	Alabama A&M	W 88–52	1–0	The Pit (14,445); Albuquerque, NM
Nov 17*; 4:05 pm, RTRM	No. 22	Charleston Southern	W 109–93	2–0	The Pit (14,146); Albuquerque, NM
Nov 21*; 1:00 pm, ESPNU	No. 19	vs. UAB; Charleston Classic First Round	W 97–94 ^{2OT}	3–0	TD Arena (1,873); Charleston, SC
Nov 22*; 12:30 pm, ESPNU	No. 19	vs. Massachusetts; Charleston Classic semifinals	L 65–81	3–1	TD Arena (1,730); Charleston, SC
Nov 24*; 10:00 am, ESPNU	No. 19	vs. Davidson; Charleston Classic 3rd place game	W 79–58	4–1	TD Arena (1,137); Charleston, SC
Nov 30*; 1:05 pm, RTRM		San Diego	W 73–66	5–1	The Pit (15,364); Albuquerque, NM
Dec 4*; 7:00 pm, AggieVision		at New Mexico State; Rio Grande Rivalry	W 79–70	6–1	Pan American Center (9,184); Las Cruces, NM
Dec 7*; 2:05 pm, CBSSN		Cincinnati	W 63–54	7–1	The Pit (15,411); Albuquerque, NM
Dec 14*; 5:00 pm, ESPN2		vs. No. 13 Kansas; Kansas City Shootout	L 63–80	7–2	Sprint Center (18,493); Kansas City, MO
Dec 17*; 7:00 pm, ESPN3		New Mexico State; Rio Grande Rivalry	L 61–67	7–3	The Pit (15,411); Albuquerque, NM
Dec 21*; 7:00 pm, ESPNU		vs. Marquette; MGM Grand Showcase	W 75–68	8–3	MGM Grand Garden Arena (N/A); Paradise, NV
Dec 23*; 7:05 pm, RTRM		Grand Canyon	W 80–68	9–3	The Pit (15,322); Albuquerque, NM
Conference regular season
Jan 4; 4:05 pm, ESPNU		Colorado State	W 80–73	10–3 (1–0)	The Pit (15,411); Albuquerque, NM
Jan 8; 7:00 pm, ESPN3		at Wyoming	W 72–69 ^{OT}	11–3 (2–0)	Arena-Auditorium (4,711); Laramie, WY
Jan 11; 8:05 pm, RTRM		at San Jose State	W 69–65	12–3 (3–0)	Event Center Arena (2,078); San Jose, CA
Jan 15; 7:05 pm, CBSSN		UNLV	L 73–76	12–4 (3–1)	The Pit (15,351); Albuquerque, NM
Jan 18; 5:00 pm, ESPN3		at Fresno State	W 89–78	13–4 (4–1)	Save Mart Center (6,499); Fresno, CA
Jan 21; 7:15 pm, CBSSN		Boise State	W 84–75	14–4 (5–1)	The Pit (15,242); Albuquerque, NM
Jan 25; 2:00 pm, ESPN3		at Colorado State	W 68–66	15–4 (6–1)	Moby Arena (5,592); Ft. Collins, CO
Jan 28; 9:05 pm, ESPNU		at Utah State	W 78–65	16–4 (7–1)	Dee Glen Smith Spectrum (9,751); Logan, UT
Feb 1; 6:05 pm, RTRM		San Jose State	W 72–47	17–4 (8–1)	The Pit (15,411); Albuquerque, NM
Feb 5; 9:05 pm, ESPNU		Wyoming	W 66–61 ^{OT}	18–4 (9–1)	The Pit (15,077); Albuquerque, NM
Feb 12; 7:15 pm, CBSSN		at Boise State	L 70–71	18–5 (9–2)	Taco Bell Arena (6,329); Boise, ID
Feb 15; 4:05 pm, CBSSN		Nevada	W 90–72	19–5 (10–2)	The Pit (15,411); Albuquerque, NM
Feb 19; 9:05 pm, ESPN2		at UNLV	W 68–56	20–5 (11–2)	Thomas and Mack Center (13,701); Paradise, NV
Feb 22; 8:05 pm, ESPN2		No. 6 San Diego State	W 58–44	21–5 (12–2)	The Pit (15,411); Albuquerque, NM
Feb 25; 7:05 pm, CBSSN	No. 25	Utah State	W 67–58	22–5 (13–2)	The Pit (15,352); Albuquerque, NM
Mar 2; 4:05 pm, ESPN3	No. 25	at Nevada	W 72–58	23–5 (14–2)	Lawlor Events Center (7,259); Reno, NV
Mar 5; 7:00 pm, ESPN3	No. 21	Air Force	W 80–52	24–5 (15–2)	The Pit (15,411); Albuquerque, NM
Mar 8; 8:00 pm, CBSSN	No. 21	at No. 10 San Diego State	L 48–51	24–6 (15–3)	Viejas Arena (12,414); San Diego, CA
Mountain West tournament
Mar 13; 7:00 pm, CBSSN	(2) No. 20	vs. (7) Fresno State; Quarterfinals	W 93–77	25–6	Thomas and Mack Center (10,645); Paradise, NV
Mar 14; 9:30 pm, CBSSN	(2) No. 20	vs. (6) Boise State; Semifinals	W 70–67	26–6	Thomas and Mack Center (15,135); Paradise, NV
Mar 15; 4:00 pm, CBS	(2) No. 20	vs. (1) No. 8 San Diego State; Championship	W 64–58	27–6	Thomas and Mack Center (N/A); Paradise, NV
NCAA tournament
Mar 21*; 11:40 am, TBS	(7 S) No. 17	vs. (10 S) Stanford; Second round	L 53–58	27–7	Scottrade Center (17,955); St. Louis, MO
*Non-conference game. ^{#}Rankings from AP poll, (#) during NCAA Tournament is seed within region. S=South. (#) Tournament seedings in parentheses. All times are in Mountain Time.

== Rankings ==
Ranking movement Legend: ██ Increase in ranking. ██ Decrease in ranking. ██ Not ranked the previous week.
Poll	Pre	Wk 2	Wk 3	Wk 4	Wk 5	Wk 6	Wk 7	Wk 8	Wk 9	Wk 10	Wk 11	Wk 12	Wk 13	Wk 14	Wk 15	Wk 16	Wk 17	Wk 18	Wk 19	Wk 20	Final
AP	23	22	19	RV	RV	RV	NR	NR	NR	NR	RV	RV	RV	RV	RV	RV	25	21	20	17	N/A
Coaches	20	21	20	RV	RV	RV	RV	RV	RV	RV	RV	NR	NR	RV	RV	RV	RV	21	20	17	RV

== See also ==
- 2013–14 New Mexico Lobos women's basketball team
