= 2013–14 Colorado State Rams men's basketball team =

American college basketball season

2013–14 Colorado State Rams men's basketball
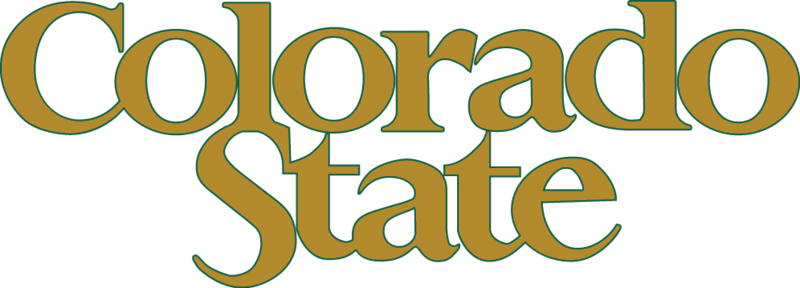
- Conference: Mountain West Conference
- Record: 16–16 (7–11 Mountain West)
- Head coach: Larry Eustachy (2nd season)
- Assistant coaches: Leonard Perry; Ross Hodge; Steve Barnes
- Home arena: Moby Arena

2013–14 Mountain West Conference men's basketball standings
	Conf.				Overall
Team	W		L	PCT	W		L	PCT
No. 13 San Diego State	16	–	2	.889	31	–	5	.861
No. 17 New Mexico †	15	–	3	.833	27	–	7	.794
UNLV	10	–	8	.556	20	–	13	.606
Nevada	10	–	8	.556	15	–	17	.469
Boise State	9	–	9	.500	21	–	13	.618
Wyoming	9	–	9	.500	18	–	15	.545
Fresno State	9	–	9	.500	21	–	18	.538
Utah State	7	–	11	.389	18	–	14	.563
Colorado State	7	–	11	.389	16	–	16	.500
Air Force	6	–	12	.333	12	–	18	.400
San Jose State	1	–	17	.056	7	–	24	.226
† 2014 MWC tournament winner Rankings from AP poll

The 2013–14 Colorado State Rams men's basketball team represented Colorado State University during the 2013–14 NCAA Division I men's basketball season. The team was coached by Larry Eustachy in his second season. They played their home games at the Moby Arena on Colorado State University's main campus in Fort Collins, Colorado and were a member of the Mountain West Conference. They finished the season 16–16, 7–11 in Mountain West play to finish in a tie for eighth place. They lost in the first round of the Mountain West Conference tournament to Utah State.

== Departures ==
Name	Number	Pos.	Height	Weight	Year	Hometown	Reason for departure
Pierce Hornung	4	G	6'5"	210	RS senior	Arvada, CO	Graduated
Wes Eikmeier	10	G	6'3"	168	RS senior	Fremont, NE	Graduated
Dorian Green	22	G	6'2"	192	Senior	Lawrence, KS	Graduated
Greg Smith	44	F	6'6"	221	Senior	Omaha, NE	Graduated
Colton Iverson	45	F/C	6'10"	261	RS senior	Yankton, SD	Graduated, NBA draft

== Recruiting ==
College recruiting
Name	Hometown	School	Height	Weight	Commit date
David Cohn; PG	Chicago, IL	York High School	6 ft 2 in (1.88 m)	170 lb (77 kg)	Jul 31, 2012
David Cohn; PG	Recruit ratings: Scout: Rivals: (79)				
Carlton Hurst; PG	Aurora, CO	Aurora Central	6 ft 3 in (1.91 m)	170 lb (77 kg)	Oct 8, 2012
Carlton Hurst; PG	Recruit ratings: Scout: Rivals: (74)				
Marcus Holt; PF	Aurora, CO	Paris Junior College	6 ft 11 in (2.11 m)	200 lb (91 kg)	Jun 25, 2012
Marcus Holt; PF	Recruit ratings: Scout: Rivals: (N/A)				
Overall recruit ranking: Scout: – Rivals: –
Note: In many cases, Scout, Rivals, 247Sports, On3, and ESPN may conflict in their listings of height and weight.; In these cases, the average was taken. ESPN grades are on a 100-point scale.; Sources: "Colorado State Commit List for 2013". Rivals.; "Men's Basketball Recruiting". Scout.; "ESPN – Colorado State Rams Basketball Recruiting 2013". ESPN.; "Scout.com Team Recruiting Rankings". Scout.; "2013 Team Ranking". Rivals.

== Roster ==
2013–14 Colorado State Rams men's basketball team
Players
Coaches

Pos.	#	Name	Height	Weight	Year	Previous school	Hometown
G	2	Daniel Bejarano	6 ft 4 in (1.93 m)	202 lb (92 kg)	RS Jr	Arizona	Phoenix, AZ
F/C	3	Marcus Holt	6 ft 10 in (2.08 m)	200 lb (91 kg)	Jr	Paris JC	Aurora, CO
G	4	John Gillon (redshirt)	6 ft 0 in (1.83 m)	166 lb (75 kg)	So	Arkansas-Little Rock	Houston, TX
G	5	Jonathan Octeus	6 ft 4 in (1.93 m)	170 lb (77 kg)	RS Jr	Wabash Valley College	Miramar, FL
G	10	Joe De Ciman	6 ft 4 in (1.93 m)	185 lb (84 kg)	So	Dr. Martin LeBoldus HS	Regina, SK
G	11	Jesse Carr (injured)	6 ft 2 in (1.88 m)	184 lb (83 kg)	GS	Ainsworth HS	Ainsworth, NE
G	12	Carlton Hurst	6 ft 3 in (1.91 m)	170 lb (77 kg)	Fr	Aurora Central HS	Aurora, CO
G	13	Mike Burnett (W)	6 ft 2 in (1.88 m)	175 lb (79 kg)	RS So	Manuel HS	Denver, CO
G	14	Jordan Mason	6 ft 2 in (1.88 m)	175 lb (79 kg)	So	Ennis HS	Ennis, TX
F	15	Gerson Santo	6 ft 9 in (2.06 m)	210 lb (95 kg)	Sr	College of Southern Idaho	Valencia, BRA
G	20	Enrico Bueno (W)	6 ft 4 in (1.93 m)	200 lb (91 kg)	Fr	IMG Acad.	São Paulo, BRA
F	22	Stanton Kidd (redshirt)	6 ft 7 in (2.01 m)	215 lb (98 kg)	Sr	North Carolina Central	Baltimore, MD
F	25	Dantiel Daniels (redshirt)	6 ft 5 in (1.96 m)	230 lb (104 kg)	Jr	Southern Illinois	Wentzville, MO
G	30	Josh Morgan	6 ft 2 in (1.88 m)	172 lb (78 kg)	RS Jr	Hawaii-Hilo	Buena Vista, CO
F	31	J. J. Avila	6 ft 7 in (2.01 m)	246 lb (112 kg)	RS Jr	Navy	McAllen, TX
G	33	Dwight Smith	6 ft 4 in (1.93 m)	185 lb (84 kg)	RS Jr	Ralston HS	Omaha, NE
G	34	David Cohn	6 ft 2 in (1.88 m)	170 lb (77 kg)	Fr	York	Elmhurst, IL

Head coach

- Larry Eustachy (Long Beach State)

Assistant coach(es)

- Leonard Perry (Idaho)
- Ross Hodge (East Texas A&M)
- Steve Barnes (Azusa Pacific)

Legend

- (C) Team captain
- (S) Suspended
- (I) Ineligible
- (W) Walk-on
- Injured
- Current redshirt

Roster
Last update: 2013-10-13

== Schedule and results ==
Date time, TV	Opponent	Result	Record	Site (attendance) city, state
Exhibition
Nov 2*; 2:00 pm	Regis	W 70–69	–	Moby Arena (1,827); Fort Collins, CO
Regular season
Nov 8*; 5:30 pm	UC Colorado Springs	W 99–70	1–0	Moby Arena (4,262); Fort Collins, CO
Nov 11*; 7:00 pm, ESPNU	at No. 15 Gonzaga; ESPN Tip-Off Marathon	L 61–93	1–1	McCarthey Athletic Center (6,000); Spokane, WA
Nov 16*; 3:00 pm	Weber State	W 88–67	2–1	Moby Arena (4,133); Fort Collins, CO
Nov 19*; 7:00 pm	at UTEP	L 74–82	2–2	Don Haskins Center (7,137); El Paso, TX
Nov 22*; 7:00 pm	Northern Colorado; Colorado State Challenge	W 72–65	3–2	Moby Arena (4,473); Fort Collins, CO
Nov 25*; 7:00 pm	Prairie View A&M; Colorado State Challenge	W 95–68	4–2	Moby Arena (2,718); Fort Collins, CO
Nov 27*; 2:00 pm	Bethune-Cookman; Colorado State Challenge	W 66–52	5–2	Moby Arena (2,945); Fort Collins, CO
Nov 30*; 4:00 pm, RTRM	New Mexico State; Colorado State Challenge	W 85–83	6–2	Moby Arena (3,693); Fort Collins, CO
Dec 3*; 7:00 pm, ESPN3	Colorado	L 62–67	6–3	Moby Arena (8,268); Fort Collins, CO
Dec 8*; 12:00 pm	Southwestern OK State	W 109–55	7–3	Moby Arena (3,044); Fort Collins, CO
Dec 11*; 7:00 pm, RTRM	Denver	L 70–80	7–4	Moby Arena (3,968); Fort Collins, CO
Dec 23*; 7:00 pm	UIC	W 74–61	8–4	Moby Arena (3,225); Fort Collins, CO
Dec 28*; 2:00 pm	Lamar	W 86–71	9–4	Moby Arena (3,706); Fort Collins, CO
Jan 1; 7:00 pm, CBSSN	No. 21 San Diego State	L 61–71	9–5 (0–1)	Moby Arena (4,059); Fort Collins, CO
Jan 4; 4:00 pm, ESPNU	at New Mexico	L 73–80	9–6 (0–2)	The Pit (15,411); Albuquerque, NM
Jan 8; 8:00 pm	at San Jose State	W 66–64	10–6 (1–2)	Event Center Arena (1,513); San Jose, CA
Jan 11; 7:00 pm	Fresno State	W 76–57	11–6 (2–2)	Moby Arena (3,345); Fort Collins, CO
Jan 15; 7:00 pm	at Utah State	L 50–57	11–7 (2–3)	Smith Spectrum (9,766); Logan, UT
Jan 18; 4:00 pm, RTRM	Air Force	W 74–68	12–7 (3–3)	Moby Arena (4,296); Fort Collins, CO
Jan 25; 9:00 pm, ESPN3	New Mexico	L 66–68	12–8 (3–4)	Moby Arena (5,592); Fort Collins, CO
Jan 29; 8:00 pm	at Nevada	L 67–76	12–9 (3–5)	Lawlor Events Center (6,076); Reno, NV
Feb 1; 5:00 pm, ESPNU	at No. 5 San Diego State	L 56–65	12–10 (3–6)	Viejas Arena (12,414); San Diego, CA
Feb 5; 9:00 pm, ESPN3	UNLV	W 75–57	13–10 (4–6)	Moby Arena (3,702); Fort Collins, CO
Feb 8; 2:00 pm	at Air Force	W 68–56	14–10 (5–6)	Clune Arena (3,781); Colorado Springs, CO
Feb 11; 7:15 pm, CBSSN	Utah State	L 62–71	14–11 (5–7)	Moby Arena (3,909); Fort Collins, CO
Feb 15; 6:00 pm, RTRM	at Fresno State	L 66–75	14–12 (5–8)	Save Mart Center (6,765); Fresno, CA
Feb 18; 9:00 pm, ESPN3	Boise State	L 72–84	14–13 (5–9)	Moby Arena (3,659); Fort Collins, CO
Feb 22; 4:00 pm, RTRM	Wyoming	W 82–67	15–13 (6–9)	Moby Arena (6,590); Fort Collins, CO
Feb 26; 9:00 pm, CBSSN	at UNLV	L 70–78	15–14 (6–10)	Thomas & Mack Center (13,682); Paradise, NV
Mar 5; 7:00 pm	San Jose State	W 78–66	16–14 (7–10)	Moby Arena (4,130); Fort Collins, CO
Mar 8; 2:00 pm, RTRM	at Wyoming	L 75–83	16–15 (7–11)	Arena-Auditorium (6,734); Laramie, WY
Mountain West tournament
Mar 12; 3:00 pm	vs. Utah State; First round	L 69–73	16–16	Thomas & Mack Center (5,824); Paradise, NV
*Non-conference game. ^{#}Rankings from AP Poll. (#) Tournament seedings in parentheses. All times are in Mountain Time.

== See also ==
- 2013–14 Colorado State Rams women's basketball team
