= 2013–14 Utah State Aggies men's basketball team =

American college basketball season

2013–14 Utah State Aggies men's basketball
- Conference: Mountain West Conference
- Record: 18–14 (7–11 Mountain West)
- Head coach: Stew Morrill (16th season)
- Assistant coaches: Tim Duryea; Chris Jones; Tarvish Felton
- Home arena: Smith Spectrum

2013–14 Mountain West Conference men's basketball standings
	Conf.				Overall
Team	W		L	PCT	W		L	PCT
No. 13 San Diego State	16	–	2	.889	31	–	5	.861
No. 17 New Mexico †	15	–	3	.833	27	–	7	.794
UNLV	10	–	8	.556	20	–	13	.606
Nevada	10	–	8	.556	15	–	17	.469
Boise State	9	–	9	.500	21	–	13	.618
Wyoming	9	–	9	.500	18	–	15	.545
Fresno State	9	–	9	.500	21	–	18	.538
Utah State	7	–	11	.389	18	–	14	.563
Colorado State	7	–	11	.389	16	–	16	.500
Air Force	6	–	12	.333	12	–	18	.400
San Jose State	1	–	17	.056	7	–	24	.226
† 2014 MWC tournament winner Rankings from AP poll

The 2013–14 Utah State Aggies men's basketball team represented Utah State University in the 2013–14 NCAA Division I men's basketball season. This was head coach Stew Morrill's 16th season at Utah State. The Aggies played their home games at the Smith Spectrum and this was their first year as a member of the Mountain West Conference. They finished the season 18–14, 7–11 in Mountain West play to finish in a tie for eighth place. They advanced to the quarterfinals of the Mountain West Conference tournament where they lost to San Diego State.

== Departures ==
Name	Number	Pos.	Height	Weight	Year	Hometown	Notes
Quinn Taylor	2	G/F	6'6"	170	Freshman	Houston, TX	LDS mission (returning in 2015)
Marvin Jean	15	G	6'4"	190	Junior	Harriman, NY	Transfer
Riley Bradshaw	24	G	6'2"	180	Freshman	Corvallis, OR	Transferred to Montana
Quincy Bair	32	G/F	6'5"	180	Freshman	American Fork, UT	Quit the team
Kyisean Reed	34	G	6'6"	215	Senior	Palmdale, CA	Graduated

== Recruiting ==
College recruiting information
Name	Hometown	School	Height	Weight	Commit date
JoJo McGlaston; SG	Dublin, CA	Dublin	6 ft 4 in (1.93 m)	180 lb (82 kg)	Feb 21, 2013
JoJo McGlaston; SG	Recruit ratings: Scout: Rivals: (78)				
Jalen Moore; PF	Smithfield, UT	Sky View	6 ft 7 in (2.01 m)	195 lb (88 kg)	Jul 6, 2011
Jalen Moore; PF	Recruit ratings: Scout: Rivals: (68)				
Carson Shanks; C	Prior Lake, MN	Prior Lake	7 ft 0 in (2.13 m)	240 lb (110 kg)	Nov 16, 2011
Carson Shanks; C	Recruit ratings: Scout: Rivals: (55)				
Overall recruit ranking: Scout: – Rivals: –
Note: In many cases, Scout, Rivals, 247Sports, On3, and ESPN may conflict in their listings of height and weight.; In these cases, the average was taken. ESPN grades are on a 100-point scale.; Sources: "Utah State Commit List for 2013". Rivals.; "Men's Basketball Recruiting". Scout.; "ESPN – Utah State Aggies Basketball Recruiting 2013". ESPN.; "Scout.com Team Recruiting Rankings". Scout.; "2013 Team Ranking". Rivals.

== Roster ==
2013–14 Utah State Aggies men's basketball team
Players
Coaches

Pos.	#	Name	Height	Weight	Year	Previous school	Hometown
G	0	Marcel Davis	6 ft 2 in (1.88 m)	180 lb (82 kg)	So	American Fork	American Fork, UT
F	1	Ben Clifford	6 ft 7 in (2.01 m)	220 lb (100 kg)	RS Jr	Bingham	South Jordan, UT
G	3	James Young	6 ft 3 in (1.91 m)	180 lb (82 kg)	Fr	Albuquerque	Salt Lake City, UT
C	4	Matt Lopez (I)	6 ft 11 in (2.11 m)	245 lb (111 kg)	RS So	Washington Township; La Salle	Erial, NJ
F/C	5	Jarred Shaw	6 ft 10 in (2.08 m)	235 lb (107 kg)	Sr	Carter; Oklahoma State	Dallas, TX
G	10	Viko Noma'aea	6 ft 1 in (1.85 m)	180 lb (82 kg)	Fr	Sierra Vista	Las Vegas, NV
G/F	12	Danny Berger	6 ft 6 in (1.98 m)	205 lb (93 kg)	RS Jr	North Medford; Chemeketa CC	Medford, OR
G	13	Preston Medlin	6 ft 4 in (1.93 m)	185 lb (84 kg)	RS Sr	Hebron	Carrollton, TX
F	14	Jalen Moore	6 ft 7 in (2.01 m)	190 lb (86 kg)	Fr	Sky View	Smithfield, UT
G	20	TeNale Roland	6 ft 1 in (1.85 m)	170 lb (77 kg)	Sr	New Albany; Rend Lake College	Louisville, KY
G/F	21	Spencer Butterfield	6 ft 3 in (1.91 m)	205 lb (93 kg)	Jr	Del Oro; Yuba CC	Loomis, CA
F	23	Kyle Davis	6 ft 7 in (2.01 m)	225 lb (102 kg)	So	Alta; Southern Utah	Draper, UT
G	24	JoJo McGlaston	6 ft 3 in (1.91 m)	180 lb (82 kg)	Fr	Dublin	Dublin, CA
C	25	Jordan Stone	6 ft 10 in (2.08 m)	270 lb (122 kg)	Jr	Sky View	Smithfield, UT
F	30	Sean Harris	6 ft 7 in (2.01 m)	220 lb (100 kg)	Sr	Rocklin; Yuba CC	Rocklin, CA
F	31	Terrell Croasdell	6 ft 7 in (2.01 m)	210 lb (95 kg)	Fr	Judge Memorial	Albuquerque, NM
C	41	Carson Shanks	7 ft 0 in (2.13 m)	235 lb (107 kg)	Fr	Prior Lake	Prior Lake, MN

Head coach

- Stew Morrill (Ricks College;
  Gonzaga)

Assistant coach(es)

- Tim Duryea (North Texas)
- Chris Jones (Utah)
- Tarvish Felton (Southern Utah University)

Legend

- (C) Team captain
- (S) Suspended
- (I) Ineligible
- (W) Walk-on
- Injured
- Current redshirt

== Schedule ==
Date time, TV	Opponent	Result	Record	Site (attendance) city, state
Exhibition
Oct 25*; 7:05 pm	Central Methodist	W 108–88	–	Smith Spectrum (6,901); Logan, UT
Nov 1*; 7:05 pm	Adams State	W 86–55	–	Smith Spectrum (6,561); Logan, UT
Regular season
Nov 8*; 7:05 pm, CBSSN	USC	W 78–65	1–0	Smith Spectrum (9,935); Logan, UT
Nov 12*; 7:05 pm, RTUT	Southern Utah; Old Oquirrh Bucket	W 90–57	2–0	Smith Spectrum (9,540); Logan, UT
Nov 16*; 8:00 pm	at UC Santa Barbara	W 71–64	3–0	The Thunderdome (2,817); Santa Barbara, CA
Nov 23*; 7:05 pm	Mississippi State	W 87–68	4–0	Smith Spectrum (10,043); Logan, UT
Nov 26*; 7:30 pm	at Weber State; Old Oquirrh Bucket	W 77–71	5–0	Dee Events Center (9,169); Ogden, UT
Nov 30*; 7:00 pm, BYUtv	vs. BYU; Old Oquirrh Bucket	L 74–85	5–1	EnergySolutions Arena (18,235); Salt Lake City, UT
Dec 7*; 7:05 pm	Pacific	L 68–78	5–2	Smith Spectrum (9,558); Logan, UT
Dec 14*; 7:05 pm	Utah Valley; Old Oquirrh Bucket	W 71–60	6–2	Smith Spectrum (9,571); Logan, UT
Dec 19*; 8:05 pm	Western Illinois; World Vision Classic	W 68–52	7–2	Smith Spectrum (9,447); Logan, UT
Dec 20*; 8:05 pm	UC Santa Barbara; World Vision Classic	W 77–71 ^{OT}	8–2	Smith Spectrum (9,809); Logan, UT
Dec 21*; 8:05 pm	Troy; World Vision Classic	W 71–50	9–2	Smith Spectrum (9,704); Logan, UT
Dec 28*; 7:05 pm	San Diego Christian	W 84–53	10–2	Smith Spectrum (9,851); Logan, UT
Jan 1; 6:00 pm, RTUT	at Air Force	L 72–73	10–3 (0–1)	Clune Arena (2,223); Colorado Springs, CO
Jan 4; 7:05 pm	San Jose State	W 86–67	11–3 (1–1)	Smith Spectrum (10,015); Logan, UT
Jan 11; 6:00 pm	at Nevada	L 54–62	11–4 (1–2)	Lawlor Events Center (6,142); Reno, NV
Jan 15; 7:05 pm	Colorado State	W 57–50	12–4 (2–2)	Smith Spectrum (9,766); Logan, UT
Jan 18; 7:00 pm, ESPN3	at Boise State	L 74–78	12–5 (2–3)	Taco Bell Arena (7,969); Boise, ID
Jan 22; 9:00 pm, CBSSN	at UNLV	L 42–62	12–6 (2–4)	Thomas and Mack Center (12,919); Paradise, NV
Jan 25; 9:00 pm, ESPNU	No. 7 San Diego State	L 69–74 ^{OT}	12–7 (2–5)	Smith Spectrum (10,127); Logan, UT
Jan 28; 9:00 pm, ESPNU	New Mexico	L 65–78	12–8 (2–6)	Smith Spectrum (9,751); Logan, UT
Feb 1; 4:00 pm, RTUT	at Wyoming	L 57–74	12–9 (2–7)	Arena-Auditorium (5,981); Laramie, WY
Feb 5; 7:00 pm, RTUT	Nevada	W 83–75	13–9 (3–7)	Smith Spectrum (9,950); Logan, UT
Feb 8; 4:05 pm, CBSSN	Boise State	W 76–70	14–9 (4–7)	Smith Spectrum (10,011); Logan, UT
Feb 11; 7:15 pm, CBSSN	at Colorado State	W 71–62	15–9 (5–7)	Moby Arena (3,909); Fort Collins, CO
Feb 15; 2:05 pm, CBSSN	UNLV	L 62–73	15–10 (5–8)	Smith Spectrum (10,002); Logan, UT
Feb 18; 9:00 pm, ESPNU	at San Diego State	L 45–60	15–11 (5–9)	Viejas Arena (12,414); San Diego, CA
Feb 22; 7:05 pm	Fresno State	L 76–79	15–12 (5–10)	Smith Spectrum (9,939); Logan, UT
Feb 25; 7:00 pm, CBSSN	at New Mexico	L 58–67	15–13 (5–11)	The Pit (15,352); Albuquerque, NM
Mar 1; 6:00 pm, RTUT	at San Jose State	W 75–58	16–13 (6–11)	Event Center Arena (1,343); San Jose, CA
Mar 5; 8:00 pm, RTUT	Wyoming	W 65–54	17–13 (7–11)	Smith Spectrum (9,909); Logan, UT
Mountain West tournament
Mar 12; 3:00 pm	vs. Colorado State; First round	W 73–69	18–13	Thomas & Mack Center (5,824); Paradise, NV
Mar 13; 1:00 pm, CBSSN	vs. No. 8 San Diego State; Quarterfinals	L 39–73	18–14	Thomas & Mack Center (9,854); Paradise, NV
*Non-conference game. ^{#}Rankings from AP Poll. (#) Tournament seedings in parentheses. All times are in Mountain Time.
