= 2014 College Basketball Invitational =

College basketball tournament

- Teams: 16
- Finals site: Save Mart Center; Alumni Recreation Center, Fresno, California; Albany, New York
- Champions: Siena Saints (1st title)
- Runner-up: Fresno State Bulldogs (1st title game)
- Semifinalists: Old Dominion Monarchs (1st semifinal); Illinois State Redbirds (1st semifinal)
- Winning coach: Jimmy Patsos (1st title)
- MVP: Brett Bisping (Siena)

The 2014 College Basketball Invitational (CBI) was a single-elimination tournament of 16 National Collegiate Athletic Association (NCAA) Division I teams that did not participate in the NCAA Tournament or the NIT. The opening games were held on Tuesday, March 18 and Wednesday, March 19. After the quarterfinals, the bracket was reseeded. A best-of-three championship series between the eventual winner Siena College and the loser Fresno State was held on March 31, April 2, and April 5 in a best of three series. Games were televised by the CBS Sports Network.

== Participants ==
The following teams were announced as participants on Sunday, March 16, after the NCAA Selection Show.

Team	Conference	Overall record	Conference record
Fresno State	Mountain West	17–16	9–9
Hampton	MEAC	18–12	13–3
Illinois State	Missouri Valley	16–15	9–9
Morehead State	Ohio Valley	20–13	10–6
Old Dominion	Conference USA	16–17	9–7
Oregon State	Pac-12	16–15	8–10
Penn State	Big Ten	15–17	6–12
Princeton	Ivy League	20–8	8–6
Radford	Big South	21–10	10–6
Stony Brook	America East	23–10	13–3
Siena	MAAC	15–17	11–9
South Dakota State	Summit League	19–12	10–4
Texas A&M	SEC	17–15	8–10
Tulane	Conference USA	17–16	8–8
UTEP	Conference USA	23–10	12–4
Wyoming	Mountain West	18–14	9–9

=== Declined invitations ===
The following programs declined an invitation to participate in the CBI:

- Indiana
- St. Bonaventure

== Schedule ==
Game	Date	Time*	Matchup	Television
First round
1	March 18	7:00 pm	Stony Brook at **Siena**	
2	March 19	7:00 pm	Hampton at **Penn State**	
3	March 19	7:00 pm	South Dakota State at **Old Dominion**	
4	March 19	7:00 pm	**Princeton** at Tulane	
5	March 19	8:00 pm	Wyoming at **Texas A&M**	FCS Pacific
6	March 19	8:00 pm	Morehead State at **Illinois State**	
7	March 19	9:00 pm	**Fresno State** at UTEP	
8	March 19	10:00 pm	**Radford** at Oregon State	
Quarterfinals
9	March 24	7:00 pm	Penn State at **Siena**	CBSSN
10	March 24	7:00 pm	Radford at **Old Dominion**	
11	March 24	9:00 pm	Texas A&M at **Illinois State**	CBSSN
12	March 24	10:00 pm	Princeton at **Fresno State**	
Semifinals
13	March 26	7:00 pm	Illinois State at **Siena**	
14	March 26	10:00 pm	Old Dominion at **Fresno State**	
Finals
15	March 31	10:00 pm	**Siena** at Fresno State	CBSSN
16	April 2	7:00 pm	**Fresno State** at Siena	CBSSN
17	April 5	11:30 am	Fresno State at **Siena**	CBSSN
All tipoff times in Eastern Time Zone. Winning team in **bold**.

== Bracket ==
First round March 18–19
Wyoming	43
Texas A&M	59
Morehead State	67
Illinois State	77
Radford	96
Oregon State	92
South Dakota State	65
Old Dominion	72
Princeton	56
Tulane	55
Fresno State	61
UTEP	56
Hampton	65
Penn State	69
Stony Brook	55
Siena	66

Quarterfinals; March 24
Texas A&M	55
Illinois State	62
Radford	59
Old Dominion	82
Princeton	56
Fresno State	72
Penn State	52
Siena	54

Semifinals (Reseeded); March 26
Illinois State	49
Siena	61
Old Dominion	64
Fresno State	71

Finals (Best of three); March 31, April 2, 5
Siena	61	75	81
Fresno State	57	89	68

Home teams listed second.
During the finals, Siena hosted games 2 and 3 at Alumni Recreation Center instead of their normal home site at Times Union Center.
