= 2013–14 Wyoming Cowboys basketball team =

American college basketball season

2013–14 Wyoming Cowboys basketball

CBI First round vs. Texas A&M, L 43–59
- Conference: Mountain West Conference
- Record: 18–15 (9–9 Mountain West)
- Head coach: Larry Shyatt
- Assistant coaches: Scott Duncan; Jeremy Shyatt; Allen Edwards
- Home arena: Arena-Auditorium (Capacity: 15,028)

2013–14 Mountain West Conference men's basketball standings
	Conf.				Overall
Team	W		L	PCT	W		L	PCT
No. 13 San Diego State	16	–	2	.889	31	–	5	.861
No. 17 New Mexico †	15	–	3	.833	27	–	7	.794
UNLV	10	–	8	.556	20	–	13	.606
Nevada	10	–	8	.556	15	–	17	.469
Boise State	9	–	9	.500	21	–	13	.618
Wyoming	9	–	9	.500	18	–	15	.545
Fresno State	9	–	9	.500	21	–	18	.538
Utah State	7	–	11	.389	18	–	14	.563
Colorado State	7	–	11	.389	16	–	16	.500
Air Force	6	–	12	.333	12	–	18	.400
San Jose State	1	–	17	.056	7	–	24	.226
† 2014 MWC tournament winner Rankings from AP poll

The 2013–14 Wyoming Cowboys basketball team represented the University of Wyoming during the 2013–2014 NCAA Division I men's basketball season. Their head coach was Larry Shyatt in his third year. They played their home games at the Arena-Auditorium in Laramie, Wyoming. The Cowboys were a member of the Mountain West Conference. They finished the season 18–15, 9–9 in Mountain West play to finish in a tie for fifth place. They lost in the quarterfinals of the Mountain West Conference tournament to UNLV. They were invited to the College Basketball Invitational, where they lost in the first round to Texas A&M.

== Departures ==
Name	Number	Pos.	Height	Weight	Year	Hometown	Reason for departure
Leonard Washington	0	F	6'7"	230	RS senior	Baton Rouge, LA	Graduated
Derrious Gilmore	1	G	5'10"	170	Senior	Baltimore, MD	Graduated
Shakir Smith	5	G	6'1"	160	Sophomore	Tucson, AZ	Suspended
Luke Martinez	25	G	6'4"	190	RS senior	Bismarck, ND	Graduated

== Recruiting ==
College recruiting
Name	Hometown	School	Height	Weight	Commit date
Alan Herndon #89 PF	Colorado Springs, CO	Widefield High School	6 ft 8 in (2.03 m)	185 lb (84 kg)	Jul 5, 2012
Alan Herndon #89 PF	Recruit ratings: Scout: Rivals: (67)				
Keonta Vernon #110 PF	Tulare, CA	Tulare Union High School	6 ft 6 in (1.98 m)	210 lb (95 kg)	Oct 26, 2012
Keonta Vernon #110 PF	Recruit ratings: Scout: Rivals: (65)				
Overall recruit ranking: Scout: – Rivals: –
Note: In many cases, Scout, Rivals, 247Sports, On3, and ESPN may conflict in their listings of height and weight.; In these cases, the average was taken. ESPN grades are on a 100-point scale.; Sources: "Wyoming Commit List for 2013". Rivals.; "Men's Basketball Recruiting". Scout.; "ESPN – Wyoming Cowboys Basketball Recruiting 2013". ESPN.; "Scout.com Team Recruiting Rankings". Scout.; "2013 Team Ranking". Rivals.

== Roster ==
2013–14 Wyoming Cowboys men's basketball team
Players
Coaches

Pos.	#	Name	Height	Weight	Year	Previous school	Hometown
G	1	Charles Hankerson, Jr.	6 ft 4 in (1.93 m)	220 lb (100 kg)	RS Jr	Alabama	Miami, FL
G	2	Riley Grabau	6 ft 2 in (1.88 m)	175 lb (79 kg)	Jr	Boulder HS	Boulder, CO
G	3	Aaron Tyser	6 ft 3 in (1.91 m)	205 lb (93 kg)	So	Sheridan College	Buffalo, WY
G	5	Trey Washington (W)	5 ft 11 in (1.8 m)	180 lb (82 kg)	Fr	Woodrow Wilson HS	Dallas, TX
F	11	Derek Cooke, Jr.	6 ft 9 in (2.06 m)	220 lb (100 kg)	Jr	Cloud Community CC	Washington, D.C.
G	13	Jack Benz	6 ft 1 in (1.85 m)	180 lb (82 kg)	Jr	University School	Chagrin Falls, OH
G	14	Josh Adams	6 ft 2 in (1.88 m)	175 lb (79 kg)	So	Chaparral HS	Parker, CO
G	15	Jerron Granberry	6 ft 4 in (1.93 m)	225 lb (102 kg)	RS Sr	North Florida	Miami, FL
G	20	Nathan Sobey	6 ft 3 in (1.91 m)	185 lb (84 kg)	Sr	Cochise College	Warrnambool, AUS
F	22	Larry Nance Jr.	6 ft 8 in (2.03 m)	225 lb (102 kg)	Jr	Revere HS	Akron, OH
G	23	Jason McManamen	6 ft 5 in (1.96 m)	190 lb (86 kg)	So	Torrington HS	Torrington, WY
F	24	Keonta Vernon	6 ft 5 in (1.96 m)	225 lb (102 kg)	Fr	Tulare Union HS	Tulare, CA
F	32	Alan Herndon	6 ft 9 in (2.06 m)	200 lb (91 kg)	Fr	Widefield HS	Colorado Springs, CO
G	33	Zane Stull (W)	6 ft 1 in (1.85 m)	185 lb (84 kg)	Fr	Millard North HS	Omaha, NE
F	43	Matt Sellers	6 ft 10 in (2.08 m)	245 lb (111 kg)	Jr	Western Wyoming CC	Champlin, MN

Head coach

- Larry Shyatt (Wooster)

Assistant coach(es)

- Scott Duncan (Wooster)
- Allen Edwards (Kentucky)
- Jeremy Shyatt (Clemson)

Legend

- (C) Team captain
- (S) Suspended
- (I) Ineligible
- (W) Walk-on
- Injured
- Current redshirt

Roster

== Statistics ==
Player	GP	GS	MPG	FG%	3FG%	FT%	RPG	APG	SPG	BPG	PPG
Josh Adams	32	32	32.4	.483	.313	.734	3.1	2.9	0.8	0.3	12.7
Jack Bentz	18	0	5.8	.429	.000	.500	0.6	0.8	0.2	0.0	0.4
Derek Cooke Jr.	33	32	22.6	.629	.000	.449	5.8	1.0	0.7	0.9	6.1
Riley Grabau	33	33	35.3	.421	.420	.892	2.5	2.2	0.4	0.0	10.1
Jerron Granberry	33	7	25.2	.435	.387	.849	2.1	1.2	0.7	0.5	6.1
Austin Haldorson	15	0	4.9	.200	.250	.000	0.4	0.1	0.1	0.3	0.5
Charles Hankerson Jr.	27	1	17.2	.429	.400	.650	1.3	1.3	0.3	0.0	5.1
Larry Nance Jr.	26	26	34.7	.544	.243	.758	8.6	1.6	1.4	2.1	15.4
Matt Sellers	12	1	6.9	.286	.000	.750	0.9	0.1	0.1	0.2	1.2
Nathan Sobey	33	33	30.2	.427	.259	.691	3.4	1.9	0.5	0.2	9.8
Zane Stull	4	0	1.3	.000	.000	.000	0.0	0.0	0.0	0.0	0.0
Aaron Tyser	10	0	1.3	.714	.750	.000	0.7	0.1	0.0	0.0	1.3
Trey Washington III	29	0	9.7	.391	.333	.593	0.9	0.7	0.1	0.0	3.0

== Schedule and results ==
Date time, TV	Opponent	Result	Record	Site (attendance) city, state
Exhibition
Oct 31*; 7:00 pm	UC Colorado Springs	W 85–81	–	Arena-Auditorium (4,561); Laramie, WY
Regular season
Nov 8*; 7:00 pm	Tennessee–Martin; Global Sports Main Event	W 78–60	1–0	Arena-Auditorium (5,082); Laramie, WY
Nov 13*; 7:00 pm, P12N	at Colorado; Global Sports Main Event	L 58–63	1–1	Coors Events Center (9,429); Boulder, CO
Nov 16*; 1:00 pm	Arkansas State; Global Sports Main Event	W 85–64	2–1	Arena-Auditorium (4,934); Laramie, WY
Nov 18*; 7:30 pm	Jackson State; Global Sports Main Event	W 73–65	3–1	Arena-Auditorium (4,099); Laramie, WY
Nov 22*; 8:00 pm, RTRM	South Dakota	W 70–53	4–1	Arena-Auditorium (5,086); Laramie, WY
Nov 25*; 5:00 pm, BTN	at No. 7 Ohio State	L 50–65	4–2	Value City Arena (15,438); Columbus, OH
Nov 30*; 7:30 pm	Montana State	W 79–54	5–2	Arena-Auditorium (4,631); Laramie, WY
Dec 2*; 7:00 pm, RTRM	Black Hills State	W 79–65	6–2	Arena-Auditorium (4,536); Laramie, WY
Dec 7*; 7:15 pm, MSN	vs. South Dakota	W 67–66 ^{OT}	7–2	Rushmore Plaza Civic Center (3,356); Rapid City, SD
Dec 15*; 2:00 pm, RTRM	at Denver	L 61–64	7–3	Magness Arena (4,940); Denver, CO
Dec 20*; 7:00 pm, RTRM	SMU	L 54–62	7–4	Arena-Auditorium (4,486); Laramie, WY
Dec 22*; 4:00 pm	Northern Colorado	W 72–59	8–4	Arena-Auditorium (4,513); Laramie, WY
Jan 1*; 2:00 pm	Western State	W 69–52	9–4	Arena-Auditorium (4,262); Laramie, WY
Mountain West regular season
Jan 4; 4:05 pm, RTRM	at Nevada	L 58–61	9–5 (0–1)	Lawlor Events Center (5,740); Reno, NV
Jan 8; 7:00 pm, ESPN3	New Mexico	L 69–72	9–6 (0–2)	Arena-Auditorium (4,711); Laramie, WY
Jan 11; 7:00 pm, ESPN3	at Boise State	W 52–50	10–6 (1–2)	Taco Bell Arena (7,445); Boise, ID
Jan 18; 2:00 pm	San Jose State	W 67–56	11–6 (2–2)	Arena-Auditorium (5,673); Laramie, WY
Jan 22; 7:05 pm, RTRM	at Air Force	W 66–59	12–6 (3–2)	Clune Arena (1,881); Colorado Springs, CO
Jan 25; 2:00 pm	Nevada	W 64–62 ^{OT}	13–6 (4–2)	Arena-Auditorium (6,944); Laramie, WY
Jan 29; 8:00 pm	at Fresno State	L 62–67	13–7 (4–3)	Save Mart Center (5,946); Fresno, CA
Feb 1; 4:05 pm, RTRM	Utah State	W 74–57	14–7 (5–3)	Arena-Auditorium (5,981); Laramie, WY
Feb 5; 9:05 pm, ESPNU	at New Mexico	L 61–66 ^{OT}	14–8 (5–4)	The Pit (15,077); Albuquerque, NM
Feb 8; 8:00 pm, ESPN3	at UNLV	L 46–48	14–9 (5–5)	Thomas & Mack Center (13,863); Paradise, NV
Feb 11; 9:05 pm, ESPNU	No. 5 San Diego State	W 68–62	15–9 (6–5)	Arena-Auditorium (5,801); Laramie, WY
Feb 15; 3:00 pm	at San Jose State	W 46–38	16–9 (7–5)	Event Center Arena (1,153); San Jose, CA
Feb 18; 7:05 pm, RTRM	Fresno State	W 72–66	17–9 (8–5)	Arena-Auditorium (5,386); Laramie, WY
Feb 22; 7:05 pm, RTRM	at Colorado State	L 67–82	17–10 (8–6)	Moby Arena (6,590); Fort Collins, CO
Feb 26; 7:05 pm, RTRM	Air Force	L 53–55	17–11 (8–7)	Arena-Auditorium (4,468); Laramie, WY
Mar 1; 4:05 pm, CBSSN	Boise State	L 63–72	17–12 (8–8)	Arena-Auditorium (5,389); Laramie, WY
Mar 5; 8:05 pm, RTRM	at Utah State	L 54–65	17–13 (8–9)	Smith Spectrum (9,909); Logan, UT
Mar 8; 2:05 pm, RTRM	Colorado State	W 83–75	18–13 (9–9)	Arena-Auditorium (6,734); Laramie, WY
Mountain West tournament
Mar 13; 3:30 pm, CBSSN	at UNLV; Quarterfinals	L 67–71	18–14	Thomas & Mack Center (9,854); Paradise, NV
CBI
Mar 19*; 6:00 pm, FCS Pacific	at Texas A&M; First round	L 43–59	18–15	Reed Arena (2,346); College Station, TX
*Non-conference game. ^{#}Rankings from AP Poll. (#) Tournament seedings in parentheses. All times are in Mountain Time.

== See also ==
- 2013–14 Wyoming Cowgirls basketball team
