= 2013–14 San Diego State Aztecs men's basketball team =

American college basketball season

2013–14 San Diego State Aztecs men's basketball

Mountain West regular season champions Wooden Legacy champions

NCAA tournament, Sweet Sixteen
- Conference: Mountain West Conference

Ranking
- Coaches: No. 12
- AP: No. 13
- Record: 31–5 (16–2 Mountain West)
- Head coach: Steve Fisher
- Associate head coach: Brian Dutcher
- Assistant coaches: Mark Fisher; Justin Hutson; Dave Velasquez
- Home arena: Viejas Arena

2013–14 Mountain West Conference men's basketball standings
	Conf.				Overall
Team	W		L	PCT	W		L	PCT
No. 13 San Diego State	16	–	2	.889	31	–	5	.861
No. 17 New Mexico †	15	–	3	.833	27	–	7	.794
UNLV	10	–	8	.556	20	–	13	.606
Nevada	10	–	8	.556	15	–	17	.469
Boise State	9	–	9	.500	21	–	13	.618
Wyoming	9	–	9	.500	18	–	15	.545
Fresno State	9	–	9	.500	21	–	18	.538
Utah State	7	–	11	.389	18	–	14	.563
Colorado State	7	–	11	.389	16	–	16	.500
Air Force	6	–	12	.333	12	–	18	.400
San Jose State	1	–	17	.056	7	–	24	.226
† 2014 MWC tournament winner Rankings from AP poll

The 2013–14 San Diego State men's basketball team represented San Diego State University during the 2013–14 NCAA Division I men's basketball season. They were members in the Mountain West Conference. This was head coach Steve Fisher's fifteenth season at San Diego State. The Aztecs played their home games at Viejas Arena. They finished the season 31–5, 16–2 in Mountain West play to win the Mountain West regular season championship. They advanced to the finals of the Mountain West tournament where they lost to New Mexico. They received an at-large bid to the NCAA tournament where they defeated New Mexico State and North Dakota State to advance to the Sweet Sixteen where they lost to Arizona.

== Previous season ==
San Diego State's 2012-13 team finished with a record of 23–11 overall, 9–7 in Mountain West play for 3rd place tie with Boise State. They lost in the semifinals in the 2013 Mountain West Conference men's basketball tournament to New Mexico. They received an at-large bid as a 7-seed in the 2013 NCAA Division I men's basketball tournament, in which they beat Oklahoma in the second round, and lost in the third round to Florida Gulf Coast.

== Off-season ==
=== Departures ===
Name	Number	Pos.	Height	Weight	Year	Hometown	Notes
Aaron Douglas	32	G	6'1"	195	Senior	San Diego, California	Graduated.
Narbeh Ebrahimian	25	G	6'3"	200	Senior	Glendale, California	Graduated.
Jamaal Franklin	21	G	6'5"	205	Junior	Hawthorne, California	Declared for 2013 NBA draft.
LaBradford Franklin	3	G	6'2"	175	Junior	Temecula, California	Elected to transfer.
James Rahon	11	G	6'5"	205	Senior	San Diego, California	Graduated.
DeShawn Stephens	23	F	6'8"	225	Senior	Los Angeles, California	Graduated.
Chase Tapley	22	G	6'3"	195	Senior	Sacramento, California	Graduated.

=== Incoming transfers ===
Name	Number	Pos.	Height	Weight	Year	Hometown	Notes
Angelo Chol	3	F/C	6'9"	225	Junior	San Diego, California	Elected to transfer from Arizona. Chol will redshirt for the 2013-14 season, under NCAA transfer rules. Will have two years of eligibility.
Josh Davis	22	F	6'8"	215	Senior	Raleigh, North Carolina	Elected to transfer from Tulane. Will be eligible to play immediately since Davis graduated from Tulane University.
Parker U'u	14	G	6'4"	210	Sophomore	Sacramento, California	Elected to transfer from Hartford. U'u will redshirt for the 2013-14 season, under NCAA transfer rules. Will have three years of eligibility.

=== 2013 recruiting class ===
College recruiting information
Name	Hometown	School	Height	Weight	Commit date
Dakarai Allen; SF	Sacramento, CA	Sheldon High School	6 ft 5 in (1.96 m)	175 lb (79 kg)	Sep 12, 2012
Dakarai Allen; SF	Recruit ratings: Scout: Rivals: (80)				
D'Erryl Williams; PG	Sacramento, CA	Sheldon High School	6 ft 3 in (1.91 m)	190 lb (86 kg)	Oct 13, 2012
D'Erryl Williams; PG	Recruit ratings: Scout: Rivals: (70)				
Overall recruit ranking:
Note: In many cases, Scout, Rivals, 247Sports, On3, and ESPN may conflict in their listings of height and weight.; In these cases, the average was taken. ESPN grades are on a 100-point scale.; Sources: "2013 Team Ranking". Rivals.

== Roster ==
2013–14 San Diego State Aztecs men's basketball team
Players
Coaches

Pos.	#	Name	Height	Weight	Year	Previous school	Hometown
F	0	Skylar Spencer	6 ft 10 in (2.08 m)	235 lb (107 kg)	So	Frederick K.C. Price H.S.	Inglewood, California
G	2	Xavier Thames	6 ft 3 in (1.91 m)	195 lb (88 kg)	RS Sr	Pleasant Grove H.S./Washington State	Sacramento, California
F	3	Angelo Chol (redshirt)	6 ft 9 in (2.06 m)	225 lb (102 kg)	Jr	Hoover H.S./Arizona	San Diego, California
G	4	Dakarai Allen	6 ft 5 in (1.96 m)	195 lb (88 kg)	Fr	Sheldon H.S.	Sacramento, California
F	5	Dwayne Polee II	6 ft 7 in (2.01 m)	195 lb (88 kg)	RS Jr	Westchester H.S./St. John's	Los Angeles, California
G	10	Aqeel Quinn	6 ft 3 in (1.91 m)	200 lb (91 kg)	RS Jr	Leuzinger H.S./CS Northridge	Gardena, California
G	11	D'Erryl Williams	6 ft 2 in (1.88 m)	200 lb (91 kg)	Fr	Sheldon H.S.	Sacramento, California
F	12	James Johnson	6 ft 10 in (2.08 m)	235 lb (107 kg)	RS Jr	Elsinore H.S./Virginia	Wildomar, California
F	13	Winston Shepard	6 ft 8 in (2.03 m)	205 lb (93 kg)	So	Findlay Prep	Houston, Texas
G	14	Parker U'u (redshirt)	6 ft 4 in (1.93 m)	210 lb (95 kg)	So	Jesuit H.S./Hartford	Sacramento, California
F	20	J.J. O'Brien	6 ft 7 in (2.01 m)	220 lb (100 kg)	RS Jr	Alta Loma H.S./Utah	Rancho Cucamonga, California
F	22	Josh Davis	6 ft 8 in (2.03 m)	215 lb (98 kg)	Sr	Athens Drive H.S./Tulane	Raleigh, North Carolina
G	23	Kibret Woldemichael	5 ft 7 in (1.7 m)	150 lb (68 kg)	Fr	Mission Hills H.S.	San Marcos, California
G	24	Ryan Staten	6 ft 2 in (1.88 m)	190 lb (86 kg)	Jr	Piedmont H.S.	San Pablo, California
G	32	Desmond Maxwell	6 ft 0 in (1.83 m)	165 lb (75 kg)	Fr	Crenshaw H.S.	View Park, California
F	33	Niksha Federico	6 ft 6 in (1.98 m)	185 lb (84 kg)	Fr	Cathedral Catholic H.S.	San Diego, California
F	40	Matt Shrigley	6 ft 6 in (1.98 m)	195 lb (88 kg)	RS Fr	La Costa Canyon H.S.	Encinitas, California

Head coach

- Steve Fisher (Illinois State)

Assistant coach(es)

- Brian Dutcher (Minnesota)
- Mark Fisher (Michigan)
- Justin Hutson (Cal State Bakersfield)
- Dave Velasquez (San Diego State)

Legend

- (C) Team captain
- (S) Suspended
- (I) Ineligible
- (W) Walk-on
- Injured
- Current redshirt

Roster
Last update: 01-06-14

== Schedule ==
Date time, TV	Rank^{#}	Opponent^{#}	Result	Record	Site (attendance) city, state
Exhibition
11/01/2013*; 7:00 pm		Cal State San Marcos	W 81–66	–	Viejas Arena (12,414); San Diego, CA
Regular season
11/08/2013*; 7:00 pm		UC Riverside	W 77–41	1–0	Viejas Arena (12,414); San Diego, CA
11/14/2013*; 7:05 pm, CBSSN		No. 6 Arizona	L 60–69	1–1	Viejas Arena (12,414); San Diego, CA
11/20/2013*; 7:30 pm, FSSD		San Diego Christian	W 93–41	2–1	Viejas Arena (12,414); San Diego, CA
11/28/2013*; 5:30 pm, ESPNU		vs. College of Charleston; Wooden Legacy Quarterfinals	W 72–52	3–1	Titan Gym (1,865); Fullerton, CA
11/29/2013*; 6:30 pm, ESPN2		vs. No. 20 Creighton; Wooden Legacy semifinals	W 86–80	4–1	Titan Gym (3,287); Fullerton, CA
12/01/2013*; 6:30 pm, ESPN2		vs. No. 25 Marquette; Wooden Legacy Championship	W 67–59	5–1	Honda Center (6,007); Anaheim, CA
12/05/2013*; 8:00 pm, FSSD	No. 24	at San Diego; City Championship	W 65–64	6–1	Jenny Craig Pavilion (5,100); San Diego, CA
12/08/2013*; 12:05 pm, CBSSN	No. 24	Washington	W 70–63	7–1	Viejas Arena (12,414); San Diego, CA
12/18/2013*; 7:00 pm, 4SD	No. 24	Southern Utah	W 76–39	8–1	Viejas Arena (12,414); San Diego, CA
12/21/2013*; 7:00 pm, 4SD	No. 24	McNeese State	W 65–36	9–1	Viejas Arena (12,414); San Diego, CA
12/27/2013*; 7:00 pm, FSSD	No. 20	St. Katherine College	W 118–35	10–1	Viejas Arena (12,414); San Diego, CA
01/01/2014; 6:05 pm, CBSSN	No. 21	at Colorado State	W 71–61	11–1 (1–0)	Moby Arena (4,059); Fort Collins, CO
01/05/2014*; 1:30 pm, CBS	No. 21	at No. 16 Kansas	W 61–57	12–1	Allen Fieldhouse (16,300); Lawrence, KS
01/08/2014; 8:05 pm, ESPNU	No. 13	Boise State	W 69–66	13–1 (2–0)	Viejas Arena (12,414); San Diego, CA
01/12/2014; 1:00 pm, ESPN3	No. 13	at Air Force	W 79–72	14–1 (3–0)	Clune Arena (2,152); Colorado Springs, CO
01/15/2014; 7:00 pm, ESPN3	No. 10	Fresno State	W 68–60	15–1 (4–0)	Viejas Arena (12,414); San Diego, CA
01/18/2014; 3:05 pm, CBSSN	No. 10	UNLV	W 63–52	16–1 (5–0)	Viejas Arena (12,414); San Diego, CA
01/22/2014; 7:00 pm, ESPN3	No. 7	at San Jose State	W 75–50	17–1 (6–0)	Event Center Arena (4,117); San Jose, CA
01/25/2014; 8:05 pm, ESPNU	No. 7	at Utah State	W 74–69 ^{OT}	18–1 (7–0)	Smith Spectrum (10,127); Logan, UT
02/01/2014; 4:05 pm, ESPNU	No. 5	Colorado State	W 65–56	19–1 (8–0)	Viejas Arena (12,414); San Diego, CA
02/05/2014; 6:15 pm, CBSSN	No. 5	at Boise State	W 67–65	20–1 (9–0)	Taco Bell Arena (9,602); Boise, ID
02/08/2014; 7:00 pm, ESPN3	No. 5	Nevada	W 73–58	21–1 (10–0)	Viejas Arena (12,414); San Diego, CA
02/11/2014; 8:05 pm, ESPNU	No. 5	at Wyoming	L 62–68	21–2 (10–1)	Arena-Auditorium (5,801); Laramie, WY
02/15/2014; 5:05 pm, CBSSN	No. 5	Air Force	W 64–56	22–2 (11–1)	Viejas Arena (12,414); San Diego, CA
02/18/2014; 8:05 pm, ESPNU	No. 6	Utah State	W 60–45	23–2 (12–1)	Viejas Arena (12,414); San Diego, CA
02/22/2014; 7:05 pm, ESPN2	No. 6	at New Mexico	L 44–58	23–3 (12–2)	The Pit (15,411); Albuquerque, NM
02/25/2014; 8:05 pm, CBSSN	No. 13	San Jose State	W 90–64	24–3 (13–2)	Viejas Arena (12,414); San Diego, CA
03/01/2014; 7:05 pm, CBSSN	No. 13	at Fresno State	W 82–67	25–3 (14–2)	Save Mart Center (14,801); Fresno, CA
03/05/2014; 8:05 pm, CBSSN	No. 10	at UNLV	W 73–64	26–3 (15–2)	Thomas & Mack Center (16,030); Paradise, NV
03/08/2014; 7:05 pm, CBSSN	No. 10	No. 21 New Mexico	W 51–48	27–3 (16–2)	Viejas Arena (12,414); San Diego, CA
Mountain West tournament
03/13/2014; 12:00 pm, CBSSN	(1) No. 8	vs. (8) Utah State; Quarterfinals	W 73–39	28–3	Thomas & Mack Center (9,854); Paradise, NV
03/14/2014; 6:00 pm, CBSSN	(1) No. 8	vs. (4) UNLV; Semifinals	W 59–51	29–3	Thomas & Mack Center (15,135); Paradise, NV
03/15/2014; 3:00 pm, CBS	(1) No. 8	vs. (2) No. 20 New Mexico; Championship Game	L 58–64	29–4	Thomas & Mack Center (N/A); Paradise, NV
NCAA tournament
03/20/2014*; 6:57 pm, truTV	(4 W) No. 13	vs. (13 W) New Mexico State; Second round	W 73–69 ^{OT}	30–4	Spokane Veterans Memorial Arena (10,962); Spokane, WA
03/22/2014*; 3:10 pm, TNT	(4 W) No. 13	vs. (12 W) North Dakota State; Third round	W 63–44	31–4	Spokane Veterans Memorial Arena (11,623); Spokane, WA
03/27/2014*; 7:17 pm, TBS	(4 W) No. 13	vs. (1 W) No. 4 Arizona; Sweet Sixteen	L 64–70	31–5	Honda Center (17,773); Anaheim, CA
*Non-conference game. ^{#}Rankings from AP Poll, (#) during NCAA Tournament is seed within region W=West. (#) Tournament seedings in parentheses. All times are in Pacific Time.

== Rankings ==
Ranking movements Legend: ██ Increase in ranking ██ Decrease in ranking — = Not ranked RV = Received votes т = Tied with team above or below
	Week																				
Poll	Pre	1	2	3	4	5	6	7	8	9	10	11	12	13	14	15	16	17	18	19	Final
AP	—	—	—	—	24	25	24	20	21	13	10	7	5	5	5	6	13	10	8т	13	Not released
Coaches	—	—	—	—	RV	24	23	20	19	13	11	7	5	5	5	7	13	10	7	11	12

*AP does not release post-NCAA Tournament rankings.
