= 2013–14 Big East Conference men's basketball season =

- League: NCAA Division I
- Sport: Basketball
- Teams: 10
- TV partner(s): CBS, CBSSN, FS1, FSN, Fox

Regular Season
- 2014 Big East Champions: Villanova
- Runners-up: Creighton
- Season MVP: Doug McDermott, Creighton
- Top scorer: Doug McDermott, Creighton

Tournament
- Champions: Providence
- Runners-up: Creighton
- Finals MVP: Bryce Cotton, Providence

Basketball seasons
- ← 2012–13 2014–15 →

2013–14 Big East men's basketball standings
	Conf.				Overall
Team	W		L	PCT	W		L	PCT
No. 6 Villanova	16	–	2	.889	29	–	5	.853
No. 16 Creighton	14	–	4	.778	27	–	8	.771
Providence †	10	–	8	.556	23	–	12	.657
Xavier	10	–	8	.556	21	–	13	.618
St. John's	10	–	8	.556	20	–	13	.606
Marquette	9	–	9	.500	17	–	15	.531
Georgetown	8	–	10	.444	18	–	15	.545
Seton Hall	6	–	12	.333	17	–	17	.500
Butler	4	–	14	.222	14	–	17	.452
DePaul	3	–	15	.167	12	–	21	.364
† 2014 Big East tournament winner Rankings from AP poll Source:

The 2013–14 Big East Conference men's basketball season began with practices in October 2013, followed by the start of the followed by the start of the 2013–14 NCAA Division I men's basketball season in November. This was the 35th year in the conference's history, but the first as a non-football conference, which officially formed on July 1, 2013. Conference play started on New Year's Eve 2013, and concluded in March with the 2014 Big East Conference men's basketball tournament at Madison Square Garden in New York.

The original Big East Conference split effective immediately after the conclusion of the 2013 NCAA Division I baseball tournament. The seven schools that did not sponsor FBS football purchased the "Big East" name and reorganized as a new Big East, while the FBS schools that had not left for other conferences retained the original Big East charter and are now operating as the American Conference, known before July 2025 as the American Athletic Conference. Both leagues, however, claim the 1979 founding date of the original Big East as their own founding dates. While both offshoot leagues initially claimed the history of the original conference, that has apparently changed, as the basketball history of the original Big East is now claimed by the current Big East, and the American now considers its basketball history to have begun with the conference split. Cincinnati, Louisville, Rutgers, South Florida, and UConn, the five full members of the original Big East that sponsored FBS football before the split, joined with several new members to reorganize as The American.

The nucleus of the conference is the so-called "Catholic 7", the members of the original Big East Conference that do not sponsor FBS football, all Catholic institutions: DePaul, Georgetown, Marquette, Providence, Seton Hall, St. John's, and Villanova. The seven from the original Big East were joined by Butler and Xavier from the Atlantic 10, and Creighton from the Missouri Valley. The Big East's full membership remained unchanged from the conference's relaunch through the 2019–20 season; the first change to the league's core membership took place on July 1, 2020 when UConn rejoined from the American.

== Preseason ==
	Media
1.	Marquette (5)
2.	Georgetown (2)
3.	Creighton (1)
4.	Villanova
5.	St. John's (2)
6.	Providence
7.	Xavier
8.	Seton Hall
9.	Butler
10.	DePaul

() first place votes

=== Preseason All-Big East teams ===
Media
Semaj Christon XAVIER
Bryce Cotton PROVIDENCE
Davante Gardner MARQUETTE
D'Angelo Harrison ST. JOHN'S
**Doug McDermott CREIGHTON**
Markel Starks GEORGETOWN

- Coaches select 8 players
- Players in bold are choices for Big East Player of the Year

== Rankings ==
Legend
Increase in ranking
Decrease in ranking
Not ranked previous week

		Pre	Wk 2	Wk 3	Wk 4	Wk 5	Wk 6	Wk 7	Wk 8	Wk 9	Wk 10	Wk 11	Wk 12	Wk 13	Wk 14	Wk 15	Wk 16	Wk 17	Wk 18	Wk 19	Wk 20	Final
Butler	AP																					
Butler	C																					
Creighton	AP	RV	RV	23	20	RV	RV		RV	RV	RV	20	RV	20	12	18	11	9	13	14	16	
Creighton	C	RV	RV	23	18	RV	RV	RV	RV	RV	23	19	24	20	12	17	12	10	13	14	16	20
DePaul	AP																					
DePaul	C																					
Georgetown	AP	RV	RV		RV																	
Georgetown	C	RV	RV	RV	RV																	
Marquette	AP	17	17	25	25																	
Marquette	C	17	17	RV	RV	RV																
Providence	AP																				RV	
Providence	C																				RV	
Seton Hall	AP																					
Seton Hall	C																					
St. John's	AP																					
St. John's	C																					
Villanova	AP	RV	RV	RV	RV	14	10	8	8	11	8	6	4	9	6	6	9	8	6	3	6	
Villanova	C	RV	RV	RV	RV	19	14	12	11	14	10	6	5	9	6	6	11	9	6	3	7	13
Xavier	AP																		RV			
Xavier	C																					

== Regular season ==
=== Conference matrix ===
This table summarizes the head-to-head results between teams in conference play. (x) indicates games remaining this season.

	Butler	Creighton	DePaul	Georgetown	Marquette	Providence	Seton Hall	St. John's	Villanova	Xavier
vs. Butler	–	2–0	1–1	2–0	1–1	2–0	0–2	2–0	2–0	2–0
vs. Creighton	0–2	–	0–2	1–1	0–2	1–1	0–2	1–1	0–2	1–1
vs. DePaul	1–1	2–0	–	2–0	2–0	2–0	1–1	1–1	2–0	2–0
vs. Georgetown	0–2	1–1	0–2	–	2–0	1–1	2–0	1–1	2–0	1–1
vs. Marquette	1–1	2–0	0–2	0–2	–	1–1	0–2	2–0	2–0	1–1
vs. Providence	0–1	1–1	0–2	1–1	1–1	–	1–1	1–1	2–0	1–1
vs. Seton Hall	1–0	2–0	1–1	0–2	2–0	1–1	–	2–0	2–0	0–2
vs. St. John's	0–2	1–1	1–1	1–1	0–2	1–1	0–2	–	2–0	2–0
vs. Villanova	0–1	2–0	0–2	0–2	0–2	0–2	0–2	0–2	–	0–2
vs. Xavier	0–2	1–1	0–2	1–1	1–1	1–1	2–0	0–2	2–0	–
Total	4–14	14–4	3–15	8–10	9–9	10–8	6–12	10–8	16–2	10–8

== Honors and awards ==
=== All-Big East awards and teams ===
==== Coaches ====
**2014 Big East Men's Basketball Individual Awards**
Award	Recipient(s)
Player of the Year	Doug McDermott Sr., F, CREIGHTON
Coach of the Year	Jay Wright VILLANOVA
Defensive Player of the Year	Fuquan Edwin Sr., G, SETON HALL
Most Improved Player	Darrun Hilliard Jr., G, VILLANOVA; Daniel Ochefu So., F, VILLANOVA
Rookie of the Year	Billy Garrett Jr. Fr., G, DEPAUL
Scholar-Athlete of the Year	Alex Barlow Jr., G, BUTLER
Sixth Man Award	Davante Gardner Sr., F, MARQUETTE
Sportsmanship Award	Chris Otule Sr., C, MARQUETTE

**2014 Big East Men's Basketball All-Conference Teams**
First Team	Second Team	Honorable Mention	All-Rookie Team
James Bell, Sr., G., VILLANOVA †Semaj Christon, So., G., XAVIER †Bryce Cotton, Sr., G., PROVIDENCE †Doug McDermott, Sr., F., CREIGHTON; D'Angelo Harrison, Jr., G., ST. JOHN'S; Markel Starks, Sr., G., GEORGETOWN	Kadeem Batts, Sr., F., PROVIDENCE; Kellen Dunham, So., G., BUTLER; Fuquan Edwin, Sr., G., SETON HALL; Davante Gardner, Sr., F., MARQUETTE; JayVaughn Pinkston, Jr., F., VILLANOVA; D'Vauntes Smith-Rivera, So., G., GEORGETOWN	Ryan Arcidiacono, So., G., VILLANOVA; Darrun Hilliard, Jr., G., VILLANOVA; Matt Stainbrook, Jr., C., XAVIER; Ethan Wragge, Sr., F., CREIGHTON	Deonte Burton, Fr., G., MARQUETTE; Andrew Chrabascz, Fr., F., BUTLER; Billy Garrett Jr., Fr., G., DEPAUL; Tommy Hamilton IV, Fr., F., DEPAUL; Josh Hart, Fr., G., VILLANOVA; Rysheed Jordan, Fr., G., ST. JOHN'S; Jaren Sina, Fr., G., SETON HALL
† - denotes unanimous selection

== Postseason ==
=== 2014 Big East tournament ===
- March 12–15, 2014 Big East Conference Basketball Tournament, Madison Square Garden, New York.

**2014 Big East men's basketball tournament seeds and results**
Seed	School	Conf.	Over.	Tiebreaker	First Round March 12	Quarterfinals March 13	Semifinals March 14	Championship March 15
1‡†	Villanova	15–2	27–3		BYE	vs. #8 Seton Hall – **L, 63–64**		
2†	Creighton	14–4	24–6		BYE	vs. #10 DePaul – **W, 84–62**	vs. #3 Xavier – **W, 82–74**	vs. #4 Providence – **L, 58–65**
3†	Xavier	10–8	20–11		BYE	vs. #6 Marquette – **W, 68–65**	vs. #2 Creighton – **L, 74–82**	
4†	Providence	10–8	20–11		BYE	vs. #5 St. John's – **W, 79–74**	vs. #8 Seton Hall – **W, 80–74**	vs. #2 Creighton – **W, 65–58**
5†	St. John's	10–8	20–11		BYE	vs. #4 Providence – **L, 74–79**		
6†	Marquette	9–9	17–14		BYE	#3 Xavier – **L, 65–68**		
7	Georgetown	8–10	17–13		#10 DePaul – **L, 56–60**			
8	Seton Hall	6–12	15–16		vs. #9 Butler – **W, 51–50**	vs. #1 Villanova – **W, 64–63**	vs. #4 Providence – **L, 74–80**	
9	Butler	4–14	14–16		vs. #8 Seton Hall – **L, 50–51**			
10	DePaul	3–15	11–20		vs. #10 Georgetown – **W, 60–56**	vs. #2 Creighton – **L, 62–84**		
‡ – Big East regular season champions, and tournament No. 1 seed. † – Received a single-bye in the conference tournament. Overall records include all games played in the Big East tournament.

=== Bracket ===
**First round** March 12
8	**Seton Hall**	**51**
9	Butler	50
7	Georgetown	56
10	**DePaul**	**60**

**Quarterfinals**; March 13
1	Villanova	63
8	**Seton Hall**	**64**
4	**Providence**	**79**
5	St. John's	74
2	**Creighton**	**84**
10	DePaul	62
3	**Xavier**	**68**
6	Marquette	65

**Semifinals**; March 14
8	Seton Hall	74
4	**Providence**	**80**
2	**Creighton**	**82**
3	Xavier	74

**Championship**; March 15
4	**Providence**	**65**
2	Creighton	58

* denotes overtime game

=== NCAA tournament ===
Seed	Region	School	First Four	Round of 64	Round of 32	Sweet 16	Elite Eight	Final Four	Championship
1	East	**Villanova**		**W, 75–53** vs. #15 Milwaukee – (Buffalo, NY)	**L, 65–77** vs. #7 UConn – (Buffalo, NY)				
3	West	**Creighton**		**W, 76–66** vs. #14 UL Lafayette – (San Antonio, TX)	**L, 55–85** vs. #6 Baylor – (San Antonio, TX)				
11	East	**Providence**		**L, 77–79** vs. #6 UNC – (San Antonio, TX)					
12	Midwest	**Xavier**	**L, 59–74** vs. #12 NC State – (Dayton, OH)						
		W–L (%):	0–1 (.000)	2–1 (.667)	0–2 (.000)	0–0 (–)	0–0 (–)	0–0 (–)	0–0 (–) Total: 2–4 (.333)

* denotes overtime game
