= James Bell (basketball) =

American basketball player (born 1992)

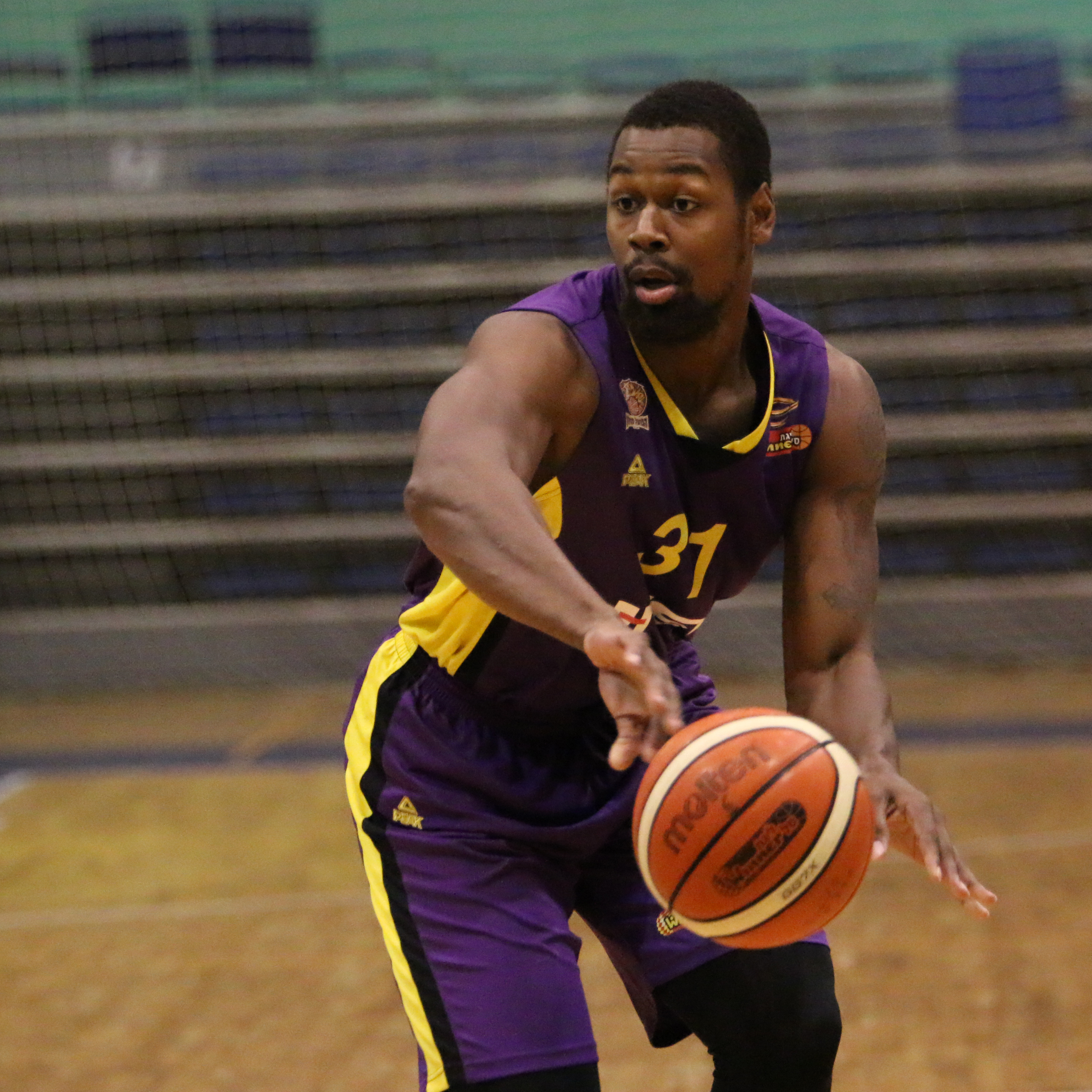
- Bell with Hapoel Holon in 2016

No. 31 – Yokohama B-Corsairs
- Position: Small forward
- League: B.League

Personal information
- Born: January 7, 1992 (age 34) Plainfield, New Jersey, U.S.
- Listed height: 1.98 m (6 ft 6 in)
- Listed weight: 100 kg (220 lb)

Career information
- High school: Montverde Academy (Orlando, Florida)
- College: Villanova (2010–2014)
- NBA draft: 2014: undrafted
- Playing career: 2014–present

Career history
- 2014–2015: Vanoli Cremona
- 2015–2016: SLUC Nancy
- 2016–2017: Hapoel Holon
- 2017–2018: Darüşşafaka
- 2018: Cedevita
- 2018–2019: Budućnost Podgorica
- 2020: Promitheas Patras
- 2020–2021: Brindisi
- 2021–2022: Anwil Włocławek
- 2022–2026: Yamagata Wyverns
- 2026–present: Yokohama B-Corsairs

Career highlights
- EuroCup champion (2018); ENBL champion (2022); Montenegrin League champion (2019); Montenegrin Cup winner (2019); All-Israeli League First Team (2017); First-team All-Big East (2014); Robert V. Geasey Trophy winner (2014); Fourth-team Parade All-American (2010)

James Tahj Mainor-Bell (born January 7, 1992) is an American professional basketball player for the Yokohama B-Corsairs of the B.League. He played college basketball for the Villanova Wildcats before playing professionally in Italy, France, Israel, Turkey, Croatia, Montenegro, Greece, Poland, and Japan. Born and raised in Plainfield, New Jersey, he moved to Orlando, Florida to attend Montverde Academy. In his senior year at Montverde, he averaged 18.3 points and 6.3 rebounds per game to lead Montverde to a 23–5 record and was named a third team All-American by USA Today. Both his freshman and sophomore years at Villanova were hampered by injuries to his leg and ankle. He increased his scoring average to 8.6 points per game as a junior to lead Villanova to the NCAA tournament.

== Early life ==
Bell was born on January 7, 1992, to James Mainor and Erika Bell. He has two younger brothers, Jayden and Justin. Bell was raised in Plainfield, New Jersey but moved to Orlando, Florida to attend Montverde Academy where he was coached by Kevin Sutton. He was named Lake County player of the year as a junior and senior. As a senior, he averaged 18.3 points and 6.3 rebounds per game to lead Montverde to a 23–5 record and national ranking. The Orlando Sentinel selected Bell to the first team all-area at the conclusion of his senior year. USA Today named him a third team All-American, and Parade named him a fourth team All-American. He was Scout.com's No. 78-ranked player in the 2010 recruiting class.

College recruiting
Name	Hometown	School	Height	Weight	Commit date
James Bell; SF	Montverde, FL	Montverde Academy	6 ft 5 in (1.96 m)	215 lb (98 kg)	Jul 31, 2008
James Bell; SF	Recruit ratings: Scout: Rivals: (95)				
Overall Recruiting Rankings: Scout – 78

== College career ==
=== Freshman ===
As a freshman, Bell was a backup to guards Corey Fisher, Corey Stokes, and Maalik Wayns. He was hampered by stress fractures in his tibia. The injury was so bad it required metal rods to be inserted in both legs. He missed the first five games of his freshman year recuperating from the surgery. With Stokes injured, Bell scored a season-high 21 points in a win over Seton Hall on February 15, 2011. He averaged 2.4 points and 1.3 rebounds per game as a freshman.

=== Sophomore ===
As a sophomore, Bell averaged 7.0 points and 3.8 rebounds per game and shot 36% from behind the three-point arc. He scored a season-high 18 points on 6-of-11 shooting along with six rebounds to help the Wildcats beat Seton Hall 84–76 on January 21, 2012. On January 25, he recorded his first double-double with 14 points and 13 rebounds in a loss to Louisville. He suffered a sprained ankle on February 15, 2012, which derailed the rest of his sophomore season. Villanova finished the season a disappointing 13–19.

=== Junior ===
Bell posted averages of 8.3 points and 4.2 rebounds per game in his junior season. Villanova went 11–2 in games that he scored in excess of 10 points. His season-high 19 points came on November 11, when the Wildcats defeated the Marshall Thundering Herd. The following game, Bell hit two three-pointers in overtime to help Villanova defeat Purdue 89–81. He finished with 16 points. Bell tallied 12 points–including the winning three-pointer–in a December 11 victory over crosstown rival Saint Joseph's. On January 26, 2013, Bell notched 13 ponts and hit consecutive three-pointers in overtime in a win over Syracuse. Villanova reached the NCAA tournament, and Bell scored four points in their matchup versus North Carolina.

=== Senior ===
Bell averaged 15.6 points and 5.3 rebounds per game to lead Villanova to three wins over USC, Kansas and Iowa and the Battle 4 Atlantis championship. As a result, he earned Big East and Philadelphia Big 5 player of the week honors on December 2, 2013. He scored a career-high 30 points in a 94–85 overtime win over Marquette on January 25, 2014. The performance earned him Big 5 player of the week honors. He was named the Big 5 player of the week the following week after scoring 19 points in a victory over Temple. For the week of February 10, he garnered his third straight Big 5 player of the week honors as well as being named Big East player of the week. On February 13, he was named one of the 30 finalists for Naismith College Player of the Year. Bell scored his 1000th point in a Villanova uniform in a March 6 game against Xavier. By defeating the Musketeers, Villanova clinched their first regular season Big East championship since 1982.

As a senior, Bell led the team in scoring, averaging 14.4 points per game, and tied for the team high in rebounding with 6.1 per game. In the NCAA Tournament, Bell posted 14 points and 5 rebounds in a loss to eventual national champion Connecticut. He was named to the all-Big East First Team at the conclusion of the regular season. He was selected to the District Ii (NY, NJ, DE, DC, PA, WV) All-District team by the United States Basketball Writers Association (USBWA). Bell was listed on the National Association of Basketball Coaches Division I All‐District 5 first team on March 12. He won the Robert V. Geasey Trophy honoring the best player in the Big 5. Villanova coach Jay Wright said that Bell's "got as much respect as any player we've had here."

== Professional career ==
=== Vanoli Cremona (2014–2015) ===
After going undrafted in the 2014 NBA draft, Bell joined the Charlotte Hornets in the 2014 NBA Summer League.

On July 27, 2014, Bell signed with the Italian team Vanoli Cremona for the 2014–15 season.

=== Nancy (2015–2016) ===
On July 11, 2015, Bell signed a one-year deal with the French team SLUC Nancy. On October 31, 2015, Bell recorded a career-high 32 points, shooting 13-of-21 from the field, along with four rebounds and two steals in a 104–108 loss to Pau-Orthez.

=== Hapoel Holon (2016–2017) ===
On August 3, 2016, Bell signed with the Israeli team Hapoel Holon for the 2016–17 season. On December 29, 2016, Bell recorded a season-high and a double-double of 29 points and 10 rebounds, shooting 10-of-15 from the field in a 100–93 win over Hapoel Gilboa Galil.

In 37 games played during the 2016–17, Bell averaged 14.9 points, 5.1 rebounds, 1.8 assists and 1.3 steals per game. He was named two-time Israeli League Player of the Month (for games played in March and April), three-time MVP of the Round and made the All-Israeli League First Team.

Bell helped Holon to reach the 2017 Israeli League Playoffs as the first seed, but they eventually were eliminated by Maccabi Haifa in the Quarterfinals.

=== Darüşşafaka (2017–2018) ===
On June 30, 2017, Bell joined the Los Angeles Clippers for the 2017 NBA Summer League. On July 15, 2017, Bell signed a one-year contract with the Turkish team Darüşşafaka. On March 6, 2018, Bell has been ruled out for the rest of the season after he suffered a foot injury in a match against KK Budućnost.

In 36 games played for Darüşşafaka (including the EuroCup and all Turkish competitions), he averaged 9.2 points, 3.3 rebounds and 1.1 assists per game. Bell won the 2018 EuroCup title with Darüşşafaka.

=== Cedevita (2018) ===
On July 31, 2018, Bell signed with the Croatian team Cedevita for the 2018–19 season. In 19 games played for Cedevita, Bell averaged 13.5 points, 3.5 rebounds, 1.2 assists per game, shooting 42.3 percent from 3-point range.

=== Budućnost (2018–2019) ===
On December 21, 2018, Bell joined Budućnost Podgorica of the ABA League and the EuroLeague, signing for the rest of the season.

=== Promitheas Patras (2020) ===
On November 1, 2019, Bell signed a one-year deal Partizan of the ABA League and the EuroCup, but the contract was terminated after a few days due to the failure of medical examinations.

On January 28, 2020, Bell signed with Promitheas Patras.

=== New Basket Brindisi (2020–2021) ===
On July 11, 2020, Bell signed with New Basket Brindisi of the Lega Basket Serie A (LBA) and the Basketball Champions League.

=== Anwil Włocławek (2021–2022) ===
On July 8, 2021, Bell signed with Anwil Włocławek of the Polish Basketball League.

=== Yamagata Wyverns (2022–2026) ===
On July 11, 2022, Bell signed with the Yamagata Wyverns of the Japanese B.League.

=== Yokohama B-Corsairs (2026–present) ===
On October 6, 2026, Bell signed with the Yokohama B-Corsairs of the Japanese B.League.

== National team career ==
Following the close of his freshman year at Villanova, Bell was selected to the U.S. team sent to Riga, Latvia for the 2011 FIBA Under-19 World Championship. Bell started all nine matches and averaged 3.8 points per game on and 3.1 rebounds per contest. The United States finished 7–2, good for fifth in the tournament. His best game was a 16-point, eight-rebound performance to help the U.S. defeat Canada 83–34 in the opening day of the second round of the tournament.

== Career statistics ==
Legend
GP	Games played	GS	Games started	MPG	Minutes per game
FG%	Field goal percentage	3P%	3-point field goal percentage	FT%	Free throw percentage
RPG	Rebounds per game	APG	Assists per game	SPG	Steals per game
BPG	Blocks per game	PPG	Points per game	**Bold**	Career high

=== EuroCup ===
Year	Team	GP	GS	MPG	FG%	3P%	FT%	RPG	APG	SPG	BPG	PPG	PIR
2015–16	(France) Nancy	10	3	19.2	.441	.486	1.00	2.4	.8	.4	.0	8.6	6.0
2017–18	(Turkey) Darüşşafaka	17	12	23.2	.380	.293	.808	3.5	.8	.5	.2	8.7	7.3
2018–19	(Croatia) Cedevita	7	5	26.6	.362	.341	.857	3.1	1.4	.7	.1	10.8	7.6

=== College ===
Year	Team	GP	GS	MPG	FG%	3P%	FT%	RPG	APG	SPG	BPG	PPG
2010–11	Villanova Wildcats	25	0	9.1	.417	.323	.786	1.3	0.2	0.3	0.1	2.4
2011–12	Villanova Wildcats	29	18	23.0	.393	.361	.794	3.8	1.3	0.7	0.3	7.0
2012–13	Villanova Wildcats	**34**	**34**	28.5	.401	.364	.737	4.2	1.4	1.1	0.4	8.6
2013–14	Villanova Wildcats	**34**	**34**	**29.5**	**.426**	**.371**	**.815**	**6.1**	**1.6**	**1.3**	**0.6**	**14.4**
Career		122	86	23.5	.411	.364	.789	4.0	1.1	.9	.3	8.5
