= 2013–14 Villanova Wildcats men's basketball team =

American college basketball season

2013–14 Villanova Wildcats men's basketball

Big East regular season champions Philadelphia Big 5 champions Battle 4 Atlantis champions

NCAA tournament, round of 32
- Conference: Big East Conference

Ranking
- Coaches: No. 13
- AP: No. 6
- Record: 29–5 (16–2 Big East)
- Head coach: Jay Wright (13th season)
- Assistant coaches: Baker Dunleavy; Ashley Howard; Kyle Neptune
- Home arena: The Pavilion; Wells Fargo Center

2013–14 Big East men's basketball standings
	Conf.				Overall
Team	W		L	PCT	W		L	PCT
No. 6 Villanova	16	–	2	.889	29	–	5	.853
No. 16 Creighton	14	–	4	.778	27	–	8	.771
Providence †	10	–	8	.556	23	–	12	.657
Xavier	10	–	8	.556	21	–	13	.618
St. John's	10	–	8	.556	20	–	13	.606
Marquette	9	–	9	.500	17	–	15	.531
Georgetown	8	–	10	.444	18	–	15	.545
Seton Hall	6	–	12	.333	17	–	17	.500
Butler	4	–	14	.222	14	–	17	.452
DePaul	3	–	15	.167	12	–	21	.364
† 2014 Big East tournament winner Rankings from AP poll Source:

The 2013–14 Villanova Wildcats men's basketball team represented Villanova University in the 2013–14 NCAA Division I men's basketball season. Led by the school's 13th head coach Jay Wright, the Wildcats participated in the newly organized Big East Conference and played their home games at The Pavilion, with some select home games at the Wells Fargo Center. They finished the season 29–5, 16–2 in Big East play to win the regular season Big East championship. They were upset in the quarterfinals of the Big East tournament by Seton Hall. They received an at-large bid to the NCAA tournament where they defeated Milwaukee in the second round before losing in the third round to eventual National Champions UConn.

== Roster ==
2013–14 Villanova Wildcats men's basketball team
Players
Coaches

Pos.	#	Name	Height	Weight	Year	Hometown
G	0	Henry Lowe	5 ft 11 in (1.8 m)	185 lb (84 kg)	So	New York, New York
F	2	Kris Jenkins	6 ft 6 in (1.98 m)	255 lb (116 kg)	Fr	Upper Marlboro, Maryland
G	3	Josh Hart	6 ft 5 in (1.96 m)	202 lb (92 kg)	Fr	Washington, D.C.
G	4	Darrun Hilliard	6 ft 6 in (1.98 m)	215 lb (98 kg)	Jr	Bethlehem, Pennsylvania
G	5	Tony Chennault	6 ft 2 in (1.88 m)	195 lb (88 kg)	Sr	Philadelphia, Pennsylvania
G	12	Nick McMahon	6 ft 0 in (1.83 m)	165 lb (75 kg)	Sr	Colts Neck, New Jersey
F	14	Darryl Reynolds	6 ft 8 in (2.03 m)	225 lb (102 kg)	So	Philadelphia, Pennsylvania
G	15	Ryan Arcidiacono	6 ft 3 in (1.91 m)	195 lb (88 kg)	So	Langhorne, Pennsylvania
F	20	Patrick Farrell	6 ft 5 in (1.96 m)	200 lb (91 kg)	So	Rockville Centre, New York
F	22	JayVaughn Pinkston	6 ft 7 in (2.01 m)	240 lb (109 kg)	RS Jr	Brooklyn, New York
F	23	Daniel Ochefu	6 ft 11 in (2.11 m)	245 lb (111 kg)	So	Lagos, Nigeria
G	31	Dylan Ennis	6 ft 2 in (1.88 m)	192 lb (87 kg)	RS So	Brampton, Ontario
G	32	James Bell	6 ft 6 in (1.98 m)	220 lb (100 kg)	Sr	Orlando, Florida

Head coach

- Jay Wright (Bucknell)

Assistant coach(es)

- Baker Dunleavy (Villanova)
- Ashley Howard (Drexel)
- Kyle Neptune (Lehigh)

Legend

- (C) Team captain
- (S) Suspended
- (I) Ineligible
- (W) Walk-on
- Injured
- Current redshirt

Roster
Last update: 2013-10-21

== Schedule and results ==
Date time, TV	Rank^{#}	Opponent^{#}	Result	Record	Site (attendance) city, state
Exhibition
11/02/2013*; 12:00 pm		West Chester	W 88–50	–	Wells Fargo Center (5,123); Philadelphia, PA
Regular season
11/08/2013*; 8:00 pm, FS2		Lafayette	W 75–59	1–0	The Pavilion (6,500); Villanova, PA
11/13/2013*; 7:00 pm, CBSSN		Mount St. Mary's	W 90–59	2–0	The Pavilion (6,500); Villanova, PA
11/17/2013*; 5:00 pm, FS1		Towson	W 78–44	3–0	The Pavilion (6,500); Villanova, PA
11/22/2013*; 7:00 pm, FS1		Delaware; Battle 4 Atlantis Opening Round	W 84–80	4–0	The Pavilion (6,500); Villanova, PA
11/28/2013*; 1:00 pm, AXS TV		vs. USC; Battle 4 Atlantis First Round	W 93–79	5–0	Imperial Arena (2,026); Nassau, BAH
11/29/2013*; 9:30 pm, NBCSN		vs. No. 2 Kansas; Battle 4 Atlantis semifinals	W 63–59	6–0	Imperial Arena (3,393); Nassau, BAH
11/30/2013*; 9:30 pm, NBCSN		vs. No. 23 Iowa; Battle 4 Atlantis championship	W 88–83 ^{OT}	7–0	Imperial Arena (2,593); Nassau, BAH
12/04/2013*; 8:00 pm, FS1	No. 14	Penn	W 77–54	8–0	The Pavilion (6,500); Villanova, PA
12/07/2013*; 6:00 pm, CBSSN	No. 14	at Saint Joseph's	W 98–68	9–0	Hagan Arena (4,200); Philadelphia, PA
12/15/2013*; 2:30 pm, FS1	No. 10	La Salle	W 73–52	10–0	The Pavilion (6,500); Villanova, PA
12/21/2013*; 4:00 pm, FS1	No. 8	Rider	W 88–67	11–0	The Pavilion (6,500); Villanova, PA
12/28/2013*; 2:00 pm, CBS	No. 8	at No. 2 Syracuse	L 62–78	11–1	Carrier Dome (28,135); Syracuse, NY
12/31/2013; 7:30 pm, FS1	No. 11	at Butler	W 76–73 ^{OT}	12–1 (1–0)	Hinkle Fieldhouse (9,318); Indianapolis, IN
01/05/2014; 7:00 pm, FS1	No. 11	Providence	W 91–61	13–1 (2–0)	The Pavilion (6,500); Villanova, PA
01/08/2014; 7:00 pm, CBSSN	No. 8	at Seton Hall	W 83–67	14–1 (3–0)	Prudential Center (8,546); Newark, NJ
01/11/2014; 1:00 pm, FS1	No. 8	at St. John's	W 74–67	15–1 (4–0)	Madison Square Garden (11,707); New York City, NY
01/18/2014; 4:00 pm, FSN	No. 6	DePaul	W 88–62	16–1 (5–0)	The Pavilion (6,500); Villanova, PA
01/20/2014; 7:00 pm, FS1	No. 4	Creighton	L 68–96	16–2 (5–1)	Wells Fargo Center (14,114); Philadelphia, PA
01/25/2014; 2:00 pm, FS1	No. 4	at Marquette	W 94–85 ^{OT}	17–2 (6–1)	BMO Harris Bradley Center (16,662); Milwaukee, WI
01/27/2014; 9:00 pm, FS1	No. 9	at Georgetown	W 65–60	18–2 (7–1)	Verizon Center (11,204); Washington, DC
02/01/2014*; 4:00 pm, CBSSN	No. 9	at Temple	W 90–74	19–2 (7–1)	Liacouras Center (10,206); Philadelphia, PA
02/03/2014; 7:00 pm, FS1	No. 6	Xavier	W 81–58	20–2 (8–1)	The Pavilion (6,500); Villanova, PA
02/07/2014; 7:00 pm, FS1	No. 6	Seton Hall	W 70–53	21–2 (9–1)	The Pavilion (6,500); Villanova, PA
02/12/2014; 7:00 pm, FS1	No. 6	at DePaul	W 87–62	22–2 (10–1)	Allstate Arena (7,387); Rosemont, IL
02/16/2014; 5:00 pm, FS1	No. 6	at No. 18 Creighton	L 80–101	22–3 (10–2)	CenturyLink Center (18,797); Omaha, NE
02/18/2014; 7:00 pm, FS1	No. 9	at Providence	W 82–79 ^{2OT}	23–3 (11–2)	Dunkin' Donuts Center (12,106); Providence, RI
02/22/2014; 1:30 pm, FS1	No. 9	St. John's	W 57–54	24–3 (12–2)	Wells Fargo Center (17,124); Philadelphia, PA
02/26/2014; 7:30 pm, FS1	No. 8	Butler	W 67–48	25–3 (13–2)	The Pavilion (6,500); Villanova, PA
03/02/2014; 2:00 pm, CBS	No. 8	Marquette	W 73–56	26–3 (14–2)	Wells Fargo Center (15,026); Philadelphia, PA
03/06/2014; 7:00 pm, FS1	No. 6	at Xavier	W 77–70	27–3 (15–2)	Cintas Center (10,340); Cincinnati, OH
03/08/2014; 2:00 pm, FS1	No. 6	Georgetown	W 77–59	28–3 (16–2)	Wells Fargo Center (18,828); Philadelphia, PA
Big East tournament
03/13/2014; 1:00 pm, FS1	No. 3	vs. Seton Hall; Quarterfinals	L 63–64	28–4	Madison Square Garden (14,925); New York City, NY
NCAA tournament
03/20/2014*; 10:00 pm, TBS	No. 6 (2 E)	vs. (15 E) Milwaukee; Second round	W 73–53	29–4	First Niagara Center (18,706); Buffalo, NY
03/22/2014*; 9:40 pm, TBS	No. 6 (2 E)	vs. No. 18 (7 E) UConn; Third round	L 65–77	29–5	First Niagara Center (19,290); Buffalo, NY
*Non-conference game. ^{#}Rankings from AP Poll. (#) Tournament seedings in parentheses. All times are in Eastern Time. (#) during NCAA Tournament denotes seed within region E=East.

== Rankings ==
Legend: ██ Increase in ranking. ██ Decrease in ranking.
Poll	Pre	Wk 2	Wk 3	Wk 4	Wk 5	Wk 6	Wk 7	Wk 8	Wk 9	Wk 10	Wk 11	Wk 12	Wk 13	Wk 14	Wk 15	Wk 16	Wk 17	Wk 18	Wk 19	Wk 20	Final
AP	RV	RV	RV	RV	14	10	8т	8	11	8	6	4	9	6	6	9	8	6	3	6	N/A
Coaches	RV	RV	RV	RV	19	14	12	11	14	10	6	5	9	6	6	11	9	6	3	7	13
