= 2014 Big East men's basketball tournament =

- Classification: Division I
- Season: 2013–14
- Teams: 10
- Site: Madison Square Garden; New York City
- Champions: Providence (2nd title)
- Winning coach: Ed Cooley (1st title)
- MVP: Bryce Cotton (Providence)
- Television: FS1

2013–14 Big East men's basketball standings
	Conf.				Overall
Team	W		L	PCT	W		L	PCT
No. 6 Villanova	16	–	2	.889	29	–	5	.853
No. 16 Creighton	14	–	4	.778	27	–	8	.771
Providence †	10	–	8	.556	23	–	12	.657
Xavier	10	–	8	.556	21	–	13	.618
St. John's	10	–	8	.556	20	–	13	.606
Marquette	9	–	9	.500	17	–	15	.531
Georgetown	8	–	10	.444	18	–	15	.545
Seton Hall	6	–	12	.333	17	–	17	.500
Butler	4	–	14	.222	14	–	17	.452
DePaul	3	–	15	.167	12	–	21	.364
† 2014 Big East tournament winner Rankings from AP poll Source:

The 2014 Big East men's basketball tournament, officially known as the 2014 Big East Championship, was the 35th overall edition of the Big East men's basketball tournament, but the first of the current Big East Conference. It determined the recipient of the conference's automatic bid to the 2014 NCAA tournament, as well as one of the two (or more) officially recognized conference champions for the 2013–14 Big East Conference men's basketball season (like most NCAA Division I conferences, the Big East recognizes both the regular-season and tournament winners as conference champions). It was held at Madison Square Garden in New York City.

The 2013 tournament was the last tournament for the Big East in its original form. Following a prolonged period of turnover in the conference membership, culminating in a split of the conference along football lines effective in July 2013, the Big East name was assumed by the seven schools of the original Big East that do not sponsor FBS football (a group colloquially called either the "Basketball 7" or the "Catholic 7"). The FBS schools retained the old Big East's structure and charter and joined with several other schools to form the American Athletic Conference. As part of the deal, the new Big East retained the rights to the conference tournament in New York City, even though The American is the old Big East's legal successor.

== Seeds ==
Seed	School	Conference	Overall	Tiebreaker
1	Villanova‡†	16–2	28–3	
2	Creighton†	14–4	24–6	
3	Xavier†	10–8	20–11	3–1 vs Providence/St. John's
4	Providence†	10–8	20–11	2–2 vs. Xavier/St. John's
5	St. John's†	10–8	20–11	1–3 vs. Xavier/Providence
6	Marquette†	9–9	17–14	
7	Georgetown	8–10	17–13	
8	Seton Hall	6–12	15–16	
9	Butler	4–14	14–16	
10	DePaul	3–15	11–20	
‡ – Big East regular season champions, and tournament No. 1 seed. † – Received a single-bye in the conference tournament. Overall records include all games played in the Big East tournament.

== Schedule ==
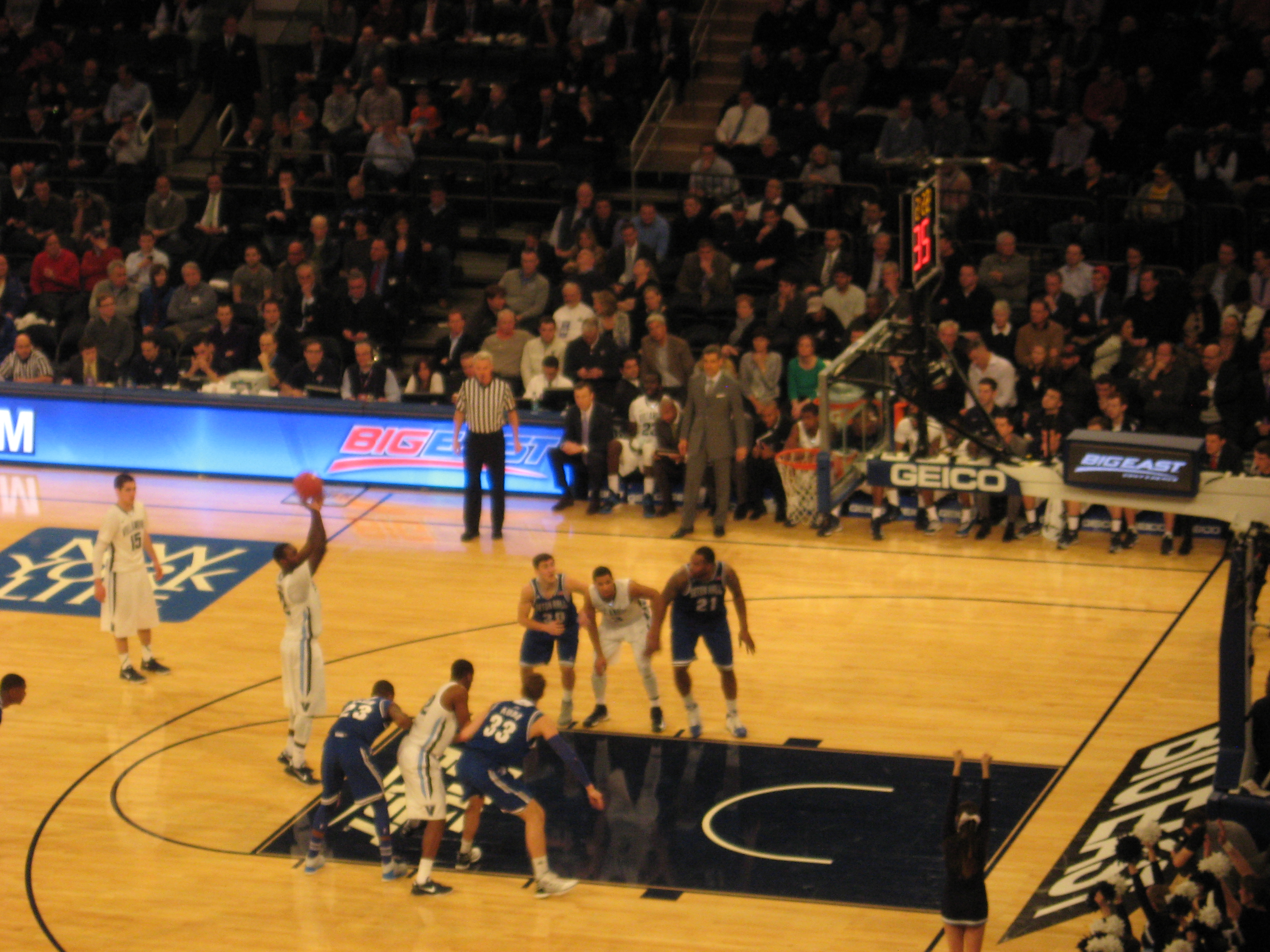
Villanova and Seton Hall playing in the 2014 Big East tournament

Game	Time*	Matchup^{#}	Television	Attendance
First round – Wednesday, March 12
1	7:00 pm	#8 Seton Hall vs #9 Butler	FS1	13,177
2	9:30 pm	#7 Georgetown vs #10 DePaul	FS1	13,177
Quarterfinals – Thursday, March 13
3	12:00 pm	#1 Villanova vs #8 Seton Hall	FS1	14,925
4	2:30 pm	#4 Providence vs #5 St. John's	FS1	14,925
5	7:00 pm	#2 Creighton vs #10 DePaul	FS1	13,807
6	9:30 pm	#3 Xavier vs #6 Marquette	FS1	13,807
Semifinals – Friday, March 14
7	7:00 pm	#8 Seton Hall vs #4 Providence	FS1	15,580
8	9:30 pm	#2 Creighton vs #3 Xavier	FS1	15,580
Championship – Saturday, March 15
9	8:30 pm	#4 Providence vs. #2 Creighton	FS1	15,290
*Game times in ET. #-Rankings denote tournament seed

== Bracket ==
First round March 12
8	Seton Hall	51
9	Butler	50
7	Georgetown	56
10	DePaul	60

Quarterfinals; March 13
1	#3 Villanova	63
8	Seton Hall	64
4	Providence	79
5	St. John's	74
2	#14 Creighton	84
10	DePaul	62
3	Xavier	68
6	Marquette	65

Semifinals; March 14
8	Seton Hall	74
4	Providence	80
2	#14 Creighton	82
3	Xavier	74

Championship; March 15
4	Providence	65
2	#14 Creighton	58

== All-tournament team ==
- LaDontae Henton, Providence
- Austin Chatman, Creighton
- Doug McDermott, Creighton
- Semaj Christon, Xavier
- Gene Teague, Seton Hall

Dave Gavitt Trophy (Most Outstanding Player)

- Bryce Cotton, Providence
