= 2013–14 Providence Friars men's basketball team =

American college basketball season

2013–14 Providence Friars men's basketball
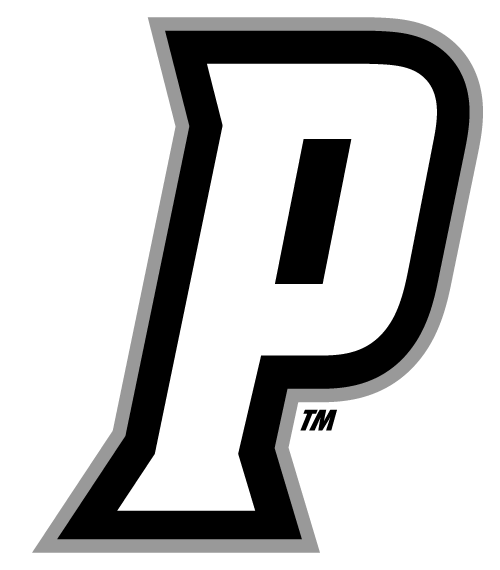

Big East tournament champions

NCAA tournament, round of 64
- Conference: Big East Conference
- Record: 23–12 (10–8 Big East)
- Head coach: Ed Cooley
- Assistant coaches: Andre LaFleur; Bob Simon; Brian Blaney
- Home arena: Dunkin' Donuts Center

2013–14 Big East men's basketball standings
	Conf.				Overall
Team	W		L	PCT	W		L	PCT
No. 6 Villanova	16	–	2	.889	29	–	5	.853
No. 16 Creighton	14	–	4	.778	27	–	8	.771
Providence †	10	–	8	.556	23	–	12	.657
Xavier	10	–	8	.556	21	–	13	.618
St. John's	10	–	8	.556	20	–	13	.606
Marquette	9	–	9	.500	17	–	15	.531
Georgetown	8	–	10	.444	18	–	15	.545
Seton Hall	6	–	12	.333	17	–	17	.500
Butler	4	–	14	.222	14	–	17	.452
DePaul	3	–	15	.167	12	–	21	.364
† 2014 Big East tournament winner Rankings from AP poll Source:

The 2013–14 Providence Friars men's basketball team represented Providence College during the 2013–14 NCAA Division I men's basketball season. The Friars, led by third-year head coach Ed Cooley, played their home games at the Dunkin' Donuts Center, and were in their first season as members of the reorganized Big East Conference. They finished the season 23–12, 10–8 in Big East play to finish in a three-way tie for third place. They were champions of the Big East tournament to earn the conference's automatic bid to the NCAA tournament where they lost in the second round to North Carolina.

== Roster ==
2013–14 Providence Friars men's basketball team
Players
Coaches

Pos.	#	Name	Height	Weight	Year	Previous school	Hometown
G	1	Brandon Austin	6 ft 6 in (1.98 m)	185 lb (84 kg)	Fr	Imhotep Charter High School	Philadelphia, Pennsylvania
G	3	Kris Dunn	6 ft 4 in (1.93 m)	165 lb (75 kg)	So	New London High School	New London, Connecticut
G	4	Josh Fortune	6 ft 5 in (1.96 m)	205 lb (93 kg)	So	Kecoughtan High School	Hampton, Virginia
F	5	Rodney Bullock	6 ft 7 in (2.01 m)	215 lb (98 kg)	Fr	Kecoughtan High School	Hampton, Virginia
F	10	Kadeem Batts	6 ft 9 in (2.06 m)	245 lb (111 kg)	RS Sr	McEachern High School	Boston, Massachusetts
G	11	Bryce Cotton	6 ft 1 in (1.85 m)	165 lb (75 kg)	Sr	Palo Verde High School	Tucson, Arizona
G	12	Casey Woodring	6 ft 2 in (1.88 m)	180 lb (82 kg)	Fr	Cushing Academy	Darien, Connecticut
F	13	Brice Kofane	6 ft 8 in (2.03 m)	210 lb (95 kg)	RS Jr	The Miller School of Albemarle	Yaoundé, Cameroon
F	21	Lee Goldsbrough	6 ft 9 in (2.06 m)	230 lb (104 kg)	Sr	Loreto College	Newcastle, England
G	22	Ted Bancroft	6 ft 5 in (1.96 m)	200 lb (91 kg)	Sr	Bishop Stang High School	Marion, Massachusetts
F	23	LaDontae Henton	6 ft 6 in (1.98 m)	215 lb (98 kg)	Jr	Eastern High School	Lansing, Michigan
F	25	Tyler Harris	6 ft 9 in (2.06 m)	215 lb (98 kg)	RS So	St. Benedict's Prep	Dix Hills, New York
G	32	Junior Lomomba	6 ft 5 in (1.96 m)	195 lb (88 kg)	So	Madison Memorial	Montreal, Quebec
F	33	Carson Desrosiers	7 ft 0 in (2.13 m)	250 lb (113 kg)	Jr	Central Catholic High School	Windham, New Hampshire

Head coach

Ed Cooley

Assistant coach(es)

Andre LaFleur
Bob Simon
Brian Blaney

Legend

- (C) Team captain
- (S) Suspended
- (I) Ineligible
- (W) Walk-on
- Injured
- Current redshirt

Roster
Last update: October 21, 2013

=== Incoming recruits ===
College recruiting
Name	Hometown	School	Height	Weight	Commit date
Brandon Austin; SF	Philadelphia, PA	Imhotep Institute Charter HS	6 ft 6 in (1.98 m)	180 lb (82 kg)	Nov 19, 2012
Brandon Austin; SF	Recruit ratings: Scout: Rivals: (87)				
Rodney Bullock; SF	Hampton, VA	Kecoughtan HS	6 ft 7 in (2.01 m)	185 lb (84 kg)	Oct 3, 2012
Rodney Bullock; SF	Recruit ratings: Scout: Rivals: (77)				
Overall recruit ranking:
Note: In many cases, Scout, Rivals, 247Sports, On3, and ESPN may conflict in their listings of height and weight.; In these cases, the average was taken. ESPN grades are on a 100-point scale.; Sources: "2013 Providence Signees". Rivals.; "2013 Providence Signees". Scout.; "2013 Providence Signees". ESPN.; "Scout.com Team Recruiting Rankings". Scout.; "2013 Team Ranking". Rivals.

=== Class of 2014 recruits ===
College recruiting
Name	Hometown	School	Height	Weight	Commit date
Paschal Chukwu; C	Westport, CT	Fairfield College Prep	7 ft 0 in (2.13 m)	220 lb (100 kg)	Aug 29, 2013
Paschal Chukwu; C	Recruit ratings: Scout: Rivals: (86)				
Jalen Lindsey; SF	Franklin, TN	Huntington Prep	6 ft 7 in (2.01 m)	180 lb (82 kg)	Jul 15, 2013
Jalen Lindsey; SF	Recruit ratings: Scout: Rivals: (83)				
Ben Bentil; PF	Middletown, DE	Saint Andrew's School	6 ft 8 in (2.03 m)	225 lb (102 kg)	Sep 30, 2013
Ben Bentil; PF	Recruit ratings: Scout: Rivals: (80)				
Kyron Cartwright; PG	Compton, CA	Compton High School	5 ft 11 in (1.80 m)	165 lb (75 kg)	Apr 7, 2014
Kyron Cartwright; PG	Recruit ratings: Scout: Rivals: (72)				
Tyree Chambers; PG	Bayreuth, Germany	Graf-Münster-Gymnasium	6 ft 2 in (1.88 m)	182 lb (83 kg)	Aug 30, 2014
Tyree Chambers; PG	Recruit ratings: No ratings found				
Overall recruit ranking:
Note: In many cases, Scout, Rivals, 247Sports, On3, and ESPN may conflict in their listings of height and weight.; In these cases, the average was taken. ESPN grades are on a 100-point scale.; Sources: "2014 Team Ranking". Rivals.

== Schedule ==
Date time, TV	Rank^{#}	Opponent^{#}	Result	Record	Site (attendance) city, state
Exhibition games
November 3*; 7:00 pm		Rhode Island College	W 97–65		Dunkin' Donuts Center (4,146); Providence, RI
Regular season
November 8*; 6:00 pm, FS1		Boston College	W 82–78 ^{OT}	1–0	Dunkin' Donuts Center (12,867); Providence, RI
November 13*; 7:00 pm, FSN		Brown	W 73–69	2–0	Dunkin' Donuts Center (6,891); Providence, RI
November 16*; 7:00 pm, FS2		Marist; Paradise Jam tournament Opening Round	W 93–48	3–0	Dunkin' Donuts Center (6,799); Providence, RI
November 18*; 7:00 pm, FS1		Vermont	W 70–49	4–0	Dunkin' Donuts Center (5,021); Providence, RI
November 22*; 6:30 pm, CBSSN		vs. Vanderbilt; Paradise Jam tournament first round	W 67–60	5–0	Sports and Fitness Center (2,275); Saint Thomas, VI
November 24*; 9:30 pm, CBSSN		vs. La Salle; Paradise Jam Tournament semifinals	W 71–63	6–0	Sports and Fitness Center (1,766); Saint Thomas, VI
November 25*; 10:00 pm, CBSSN		vs. Maryland; Paradise Jam Tournament championship	L 52–56	6–1	Sports and Fitness Center (2,655); Saint Thomas, VI
November 29*; 12:30 pm, FS1		Fairfield	W 78–69	7–1	Dunkin' Donuts Center (7,769); Providence, RI
December 1*; 8:30 pm, FS1		vs. No. 3 Kentucky	L 65–79	7–2	Barclays Center (8,086); Brooklyn, NY
December 5*; 8:00 pm, CBSSN		at Rhode Island	W 50–49	8–2	Ryan Center (7,657); Kingston, RI
December 17*; 7:00 pm, FS1		Yale	W 76–74	9–2	Dunkin' Donuts Center (3,281); Providence, RI
December 21*; 2:00 pm, FSN		Maine	W 94–70	10–2	Dunkin' Donuts Center (5,328); Providence, RI
December 28*; 6:00 pm, ESPNU		at No. 23 Massachusetts	L 67–69 ^{OT}	10–3	Mullins Center (9,493); Amherst, MA
December 31; 2:30 pm, FS1		Seton Hall	L 80–81 ^{2OT}	10–4 (0–1)	Dunkin' Donuts Center (9,568); Providence, RI
January 5; 7:00 pm, FS1		at No. 11 Villanova	L 61–91	10–5 (0–2)	The Pavilion (6,500); Villanova, PA
January 8; 7:00 pm, FS1		Georgetown	W 70–52	11–5 (1–2)	Dunkin' Donuts Center (9,187); Providence, RI
January 16; 7:00 pm, FS1		at St. John's	W 84–83 ^{2OT}	12–5 (2–2)	Carnesecca Arena (4,709); Queens, NY
January 18; 8:00 pm, FS1		No. 20 Creighton	W 81–68	13–5 (3–2)	Dunkin' Donuts Center (11,026); Providence, RI
January 21; 9:00 pm, FS1		Butler	W 65–56	14–5 (4–2)	Dunkin' Donuts Center (2,022); Providence, RI
January 25; 12:00 pm, FS1		Xavier	W 81–72	15–5 (5–2)	Dunkin' Donuts Center (11,112); Providence, RI
January 30; 12:00 pm, FS1		at Marquette	L 50–61	15–6 (5–3)	BMO Harris Bradley Center (15,248); Milwaukee, WI
February 1; 12:00 pm, FSN		at DePaul	W 77–72	16–6 (6–3)	Allstate Arena (7,139); Rosemont, IL
February 4; 7:00 pm, FS1		St. John's	L 76–86	16–7 (6–4)	Dunkin' Donuts Center (8,798); Providence, RI
February 8; 3:00 pm, FS1		at Xavier	L 53–59	16–8 (6–5)	Cintas Center (10,250); Cincinnati, OH
February 10; 7:00 pm, FS1		at Georgetown	L 71–83	16–9 (6–6)	Verizon Center (8,063); Washington, D.C.
February 15; 2:00 pm, FSN		DePaul	W 84–61	17–9 (7–6)	Dunkin' Donuts Center (12,069); Providence, RI
February 18; 7:00 pm, FS1		No. 9 Villanova	L 79–82 ^{2OT}	17–10 (7–7)	Dunkin' Donuts Center (12,106); Providence, RI
February 23; 6:00 pm, FS1		at Butler	W 87–81	18–10 (8–7)	Hinkle Fieldhouse (6,857); Indianapolis, IN
February 28; 7:00 pm, CBSSN		at Seton Hall	W 74–69	19–10 (9–7)	Prudential Center (8,125); Newark, NJ
March 4; 9:00 pm, FS1		Marquette	W 81–80	20–10 (10–7)	Dunkin' Donuts Center (11,469); Providence, RI
March 8; 8:00 pm, CBSSN		at No. 13 Creighton	L 73–88	20–11 (10–8)	CenturyLink Center (18,868); Omaha, NE
Big East tournament
March 13; 3:30 pm, FS1	(4)	vs. (5) St. John's; Quarterfinals	W 79–74	21–11	Madison Square Garden (14,925); New York City, NY
March 14; 7:00 pm, FS1	(4)	vs. (8) Seton Hall; Semifinals	W 80–74	22–11	Madison Square Garden (15,580); New York City, NY
March 15; 8:30 pm, FS1	(4)	vs. (2) No. 14 Creighton; Championship	W 65–58	23–11	Madison Square Garden (15,290); New York City, NY
NCAA tournament
March 21; 7:20 pm, TNT	(11 E)	vs. (6 E) No. 19 North Carolina; Second round	L 77–79	23–12	AT&T Center (11,690); San Antonio, TX
*Non-conference game. ^{#}Rankings from AP Poll, (#) denote seed within region E=East. (#) Tournament seedings in parentheses. All times are in Eastern Time.

== Awards and honors ==
Recipient	Award(s)
Bryce Cotton	Big East Player of the Week (Jan 13-Jan 19); First-Team All-Big East; Big East tournament MVP
Kadeem Batts	Second-Team All-Big East
