= 2013–14 Butler Bulldogs men's basketball team =

American college basketball season

2013–14 Butler Bulldogs men's basketball
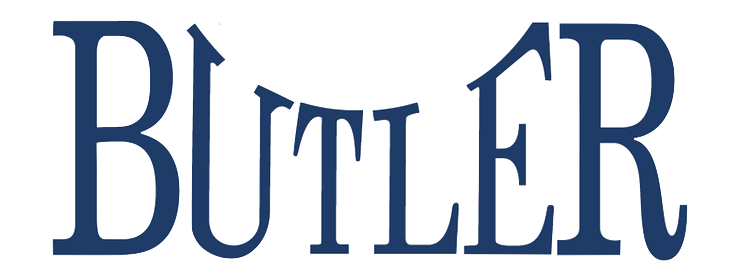
- Conference: Big East Conference
- Record: 14–17 (4–14 Big East)
- Head coach: Brandon Miller (1st season)
- Assistant coaches: Terry Johnson (7th season); Michael Lewis (3rd season); Chris Holtmann (1st season)
- Home arena: Hinkle Fieldhouse

2013–14 Big East men's basketball standings
	Conf.				Overall
Team	W		L	PCT	W		L	PCT
No. 6 Villanova	16	–	2	.889	29	–	5	.853
No. 16 Creighton	14	–	4	.778	27	–	8	.771
Providence †	10	–	8	.556	23	–	12	.657
Xavier	10	–	8	.556	21	–	13	.618
St. John's	10	–	8	.556	20	–	13	.606
Marquette	9	–	9	.500	17	–	15	.531
Georgetown	8	–	10	.444	18	–	15	.545
Seton Hall	6	–	12	.333	17	–	17	.500
Butler	4	–	14	.222	14	–	17	.452
DePaul	3	–	15	.167	12	–	21	.364
† 2014 Big East tournament winner Rankings from AP poll Source:

The 2013–14 Butler Bulldogs men's basketball team represented Butler University in the 2013–14 NCAA Division I men's basketball season. Their head coach was Brandon Miller; on July 3, 2013, previous head coach Brad Stevens accepted the newly vacant Boston Celtics head coaching position in the National Basketball Association. The Bulldogs played their home games at Hinkle Fieldhouse, which has a capacity of approximately 10,000. This was the first year that Butler competed in the Big East Conference, as they moved from the Atlantic 10 Conference following the 2012–13 season.

The Bulldogs started the season off great and were cruising into their inaugural Big East conference games. However, once they started playing their in-conference games, they fell fast. Many of the games were characterized by leads late in the second half that the Bulldogs couldn't sustain and resulted as losses in either the last minute or overtime. Some of the games also resulted in blowouts. The Bulldogs were also faced with some player transfers and other adversity; Andrew Smeathers and Rene Castro announced at various points during the season that they were transferring. Castro and Kameron Woods also faced suspensions from the team at various points during the season. The Bulldogs made an early exit in the Big East tournament, losing to Seton Hall in the first round, 50–51.

The season was the Bulldogs' first losing season since the 2004–05 season, and only the second in the past 21 years. It was also the first time in the past nine seasons that Butler did not win a game in the conference tournament.

== Off season ==
During the offseason, Butler suffered two major blows. First, on July 3, 2013, head coach Brad Stevens left to take the vacant head coaching job with the NBA's Boston Celtics. Stevens was succeeded by Butler assistant Brandon Miller, hired three days later. The second blow came on August 16, when the school announced that Roosevelt Jones, the team's leading returning scorer from 2012 to 2013, tore ligaments in his left wrist during the team's trip to Australia and would undergo surgery that would force him to miss the entire season.

=== Departures ===
Name	Number	Pos.	Height	Weight	Year	Hometown	Notes
Brad Stevens	Head coach					Zionsville, IN	Accepted position as Head Coach of the Boston Celtics
Rotnei Clarke	15	G	6'0"	184	Senior	Verdigris, OK	Graduated
Emerson Kampen	30	C	6'8"	201	Senior	Yorktown, IN	Graduated
Andrew Smith	44	C	6'11"	243	Senior	Zionsville, IN	Graduated
Chase Stigall	33	G	6'3"	196	Senior	New Castle, IN	Graduated
Andrew Smeathers	0	G/F	6'6"	185	Junior	Bargersville, IN	Transferred (Pre-Season)
Rene Castro	14	G	6'2"	175	Freshman	Milton, MA	Transferred (Mid-Season)

=== 2013 recruiting class ===
College recruiting information
Name	Hometown	School	Height	Weight	Commit date
Nolan Berry; Center/Power Forward	St. Louis, MO	De Smet Jesuit High School	6 ft 7.5 in (2.02 m)	195 lb (88 kg)	Sep 25, 2011
Nolan Berry; Center/Power Forward	Recruit ratings: Scout: Rivals: ESPN: (77)				
Elijah Brown; Shooting Guard	Santa Ana, CA	Mater Dei High School	6 ft 3.5 in (1.92 m)	187.5 lb (85.0 kg)	Jan 24, 2013
Elijah Brown; Shooting Guard	Recruit ratings: Scout: Rivals: ESPN: (74)				
Rene Castro; Point Guard/Shooting Guard	Milton, MA	Worcester Academy	6 ft 2.5 in (1.89 m)	175 lb (79 kg)	Oct 27, 2012
Rene Castro; Point Guard/Shooting Guard	Recruit ratings: Scout: Rivals: ESPN: (77)				
Andrew Chrabascz; Power Forward	Portsmouth, RI	Cushing Academy	6 ft 7.5 in (2.02 m)	237.5 lb (107.7 kg)	Aug 4, 2012
Andrew Chrabascz; Power Forward	Recruit ratings: Scout: Rivals: ESPN: (72)				
Overall recruit ranking:
Note: In many cases, Scout, Rivals, 247Sports, On3, and ESPN may conflict in their listings of height and weight.; In these cases, the average was taken. ESPN grades are on a 100-point scale.; Sources: "2012 Butler Commitments". Rivals.; "Butler Bulldogs Men's Basketball Recruiting 2013". Scout.; "Butler Bulldogs Men's Basketball Recruiting 2013". ESPN.; "Scout.com Team Recruiting Rankings". Scout.; "2013 Team Ranking". Rivals.

== Regular season ==
On November 4, 2013, after the two exhibition games, junior Andrew Smeathers announced that he was leaving the team. He finished the fall semester and transferred to Mount St. Mary's. On February 15, it was announced that freshman Rene Castro was transferring to another school. He had been suspended for three games during the season and according to Miller, was "dealing with a disciplinary team issue." Junior forward Kameron Woods was also temporarily suspended during the season; he did not make the trip to New York to play St. John's.

The team finished the season losing to Seton Hall in the first round of the Big East Championship.

== Roster ==
2013–14 Butler Bulldogs men's basketball team
Players
Coaches

Pos.	#	Name	Height	Weight	Year	Previous school	Hometown
G	11	Jackson Aldridge	6 ft 0 in (1.83 m)	187 lb (85 kg)	Jr	Australian Inst. of Sport	Lane Cove, Australia
G	3	Alex Barlow	5 ft 11 in (1.8 m)	187 lb (85 kg)	Jr	Archbishop Moeller	Springboro, OH
G	25	Steven Bennett (W)	6 ft 2 in (1.88 m)	175 lb (79 kg)	Fr	New Castle	New Castle, IN
F/C	22	Nolan Berry	6 ft 10 in (2.08 m)	200 lb (91 kg)	Fr	De Smet	St. Louis, MO
G	5	Elijah Brown	6 ft 4 in (1.93 m)	185 lb (84 kg)	Fr	Mater Dei	Santa Ana, CA
G	14	Rene Castro	6 ft 2 in (1.88 m)	180 lb (82 kg)	Fr	Worcester	Milton, MA
F	45	Andrew Chrabascz	6 ft 7 in (2.01 m)	205 lb (93 kg)	Fr	Cushing	Portsmouth, RI
G	24	Kellen Dunham	6 ft 6 in (1.98 m)	185 lb (84 kg)	So	Pendleton Heights	Pendleton, IN
F	4	Erik Fromm	6 ft 8 in (2.03 m)	223 lb (101 kg)	Sr	Bloomington South	Bloomington, IN
F	21	Roosevelt Jones (injured) (redshirt)	6 ft 4 in (1.93 m)	227 lb (103 kg)	Jr	O'Fallon	O'Fallon, IL
G	22	Elliott Kampen (W)	6 ft 5 in (1.96 m)	180 lb (82 kg)	Jr	Yorktown	Yorktown, IN
F	23	Khyle Marshall	6 ft 6 in (1.98 m)	216 lb (98 kg)	Sr	Flanagan	Davie, FL
G	2	Devontae Morgan	6 ft 3 in (1.91 m)	176 lb (80 kg)	So	Tampa Prep	Tampa, FL
G	10	Michael Volovic (W)	5 ft 9 in (1.75 m)	165 lb (75 kg)	Fr	Carmel	Carmel, IN
F	31	Kameron Woods	6 ft 9 in (2.06 m)	200 lb (91 kg)	Jr	Eastern	Middletown, KY

Head coach

- Brandon Miller (Butler)

Assistant coach(es)

- Terry Johnson (Purdue Fort Wayne)
- Michael Lewis (Indiana)
- Chris Holtmann (Taylor)

Legend

- (C) Team captain
- (S) Suspended
- (I) Ineligible
- (W) Walk-on
- Injured
- Current redshirt

Roster
Last update: 4 November 2013

== Regular season ==
=== Schedule ===
Date time, TV	Opponent	Result	Record	High points	High rebounds	High assists	Site (attendance) city, state
Australia exhibition trip
Aug 6*	vs. Norths Bears Invitational Team	W 77–65	–	22 – Dunham	10 – Woods	3 – Aldridge	Sydney, Australia
Aug 8*	vs. Sydney Kings	W 82–76	–	18 – Fromm	15 – Woods	3 – Woods	Newington College; Sydney, Australia
Aug 10*	vs. Australian Boomers	W 96–57	–	16 – Dunham	7 – Woods	–	Canberra, Australia
Aug 11*	vs. Cairns Taipans	W 97–73	–	16 – Dunham	7 – Woods	–	Cairns, Australia
Exhibition
Oct 29*; 7:00 pm	Nova Southeastern	W 101–64	–	16 – Dunham	9 – Woods	5 – Brown	Hinkle Fieldhouse (5,476); Indianapolis, IN
Nov 2*; 2:00 pm	DePauw	W 93–68	–	23 – Dunham	6 – Tied	2 – Castro	Hinkle Fieldhouse (6,067); Indianapolis, IN
Non-conference regular season
Nov 9*; 8:00 pm, FS2	Lamar	W 89–58	1–0	19 – Marshall	13 – Marshall	3 – Barlow	Hinkle Fieldhouse (9,617); Indianapolis, IN
Nov 16*; 8:00 pm, FS2	Princeton	W 70–67	2–0	26 – Dunham	10 – Woods	5 – Barlow	Hinkle Fieldhouse (7,471); Indianapolis, IN
Nov 19*; 6:00 pm, FS1	Vanderbilt	W 85–77 ^{OT}	3–0	26 – Marshall	9 – Woods	4 – Woods	Hinkle Fieldhouse (6,617); Indianapolis, IN
Nov 23*; 2:00 pm	at Ball State	W 59–58	4–0	14 – Marshall	10 – Woods	3 – Dunham	Worthen Arena (6,015); Muncie, IN
Nov 28*; 2:00 pm, ESPN2	vs. Washington State; Old Spice Classic First Round	W 76–69	5–0	32 – Dunham	10 – Woods	3 – Barlow	HP Field House (4,255); Lake Buena Vista, FL
Nov 29*; 1:30 pm, ESPN	vs. No. 5 Oklahoma State; Old Spice Classic semifinals	L 67–69	5–1	15 – Brown	9 – Woods	3 – Barlow	HP Field House (4,182); Lake Buena Vista, FL
Dec 1*; 2:00 pm, ESPNU	vs. LSU; Old Spice Classic 3rd place game	L 68–70 ^{OT}	5–2	20 – Dunham	11 – Woods	4 – Barlow	HP Field House (2.016); Lake Buena Vista, FL
Dec 7*; 6:00 pm, FS1	North Dakota	W 79–64	6–2	29 – Dunham	8 – Woods	4 – Tied	Hinkle Fieldhouse (6,355); Indianapolis, IN
Dec 9*; 8:00 pm, FS1	Manchester	W 100–41	7–2	15 – Dunham	7 – Fromm	4 – Brown	Hinkle Fieldhouse (5,931); Indianapolis, IN
Dec 14*; 6:00 pm, BTN	vs. Purdue; Crossroads Classic	W 76–70	8–2	25 – Dunham	12 – Woods	4 – Barlow	Bankers Life Fieldhouse (18,165); Indianapolis, IN
Dec 21*; 3:05 pm	at Evansville	W 68–59	9–2	16 – Barlow	13 – Woods	2 – Tied	Ford Center (7,035); Evansville, IN
Dec 28*; 1:00 pm, FS2	NJIT	W 66–48	10–2	21 – Marshall	12 – Woods	3 – Woods	Hinkle Fieldhouse (6,504); Indianapolis, IN
Big East Conference play
Dec 31; 7:30 pm, FS1	No. 11 Villanova	L 73–76 ^{OT}	10–3 (0–1)	22 – Dunham	9 – Barlow	5 – Barlow	Hinkle Fieldhouse (9,318); Indianapolis, IN
Jan 4; 2:00 pm, FSN	at Xavier	L 68–79	10–4 (0–2)	14 – Marshall	6 – Woods	3 – Dunham	Cintas Center (10,250); Cincinnati, OH
Jan 9; 7:00 pm, FS1	DePaul	L 94–99 ^{2OT}	10–5 (0–3)	30 – Dunham	14 – Woods	3 – Tied	Hinkle Fieldhouse (6,163); Indianapolis, IN
Jan 11; 7:00 pm, FS1	Georgetown	L 67–70 ^{OT}	10–6 (0–4)	21 – Dunham	10 – Woods	4 – Woods	Hinkle Fieldhouse (9,640); Indianapolis, IN
Jan 14; 9:00 pm, FS1	at No. 20 Creighton	L 60–88	10–7 (0–5)	12 – Dunham	10 – Woods	6 – Barlow	CenturyLink Center Omaha (17,602); Omaha, NE
Jan 18; 2:00 pm, CBSSN	Marquette	W 69–57 ^{OT}	11–7 (1–5)	18 – Tied	12 – Woods	4 – Barlow	Hinkle Fieldhouse (10,000); Indianapolis, IN
Jan 21; 9:00 pm, FS1	at Providence	L 56–65	11–8 (1–6)	17 – Dunham	6 – Dunham	4 – Barlow	Dunkin' Donuts Center (2,022); Providence, RI
Jan 25; 4:00 pm, FSN	St. John's	L 52–69	11–9 (1–7)	16 – Marshall	7 – Woods	3 – Barlow	Hinkle Fieldhouse (10,000); Indianapolis, IN
Jan 29; 9:00 pm, FS1	at Seton Hall	W 64–57	12–9 (2–7)	13 – Marshall	8 – Tied	4 – Woods	Prudential Center (5,826); Newark, NJ
Feb 4; 9:00 pm, FS1	at Marquette	L 62–69	12–10 (2–8)	16 – Dunham	7 – Tied	6 – Barlow	BMO Harris Bradley Center (14,479); Milwaukee, WI
Feb 8; 1:00 pm, CBS	at Georgetown	L 63–71	12–11 (2–9)	24 – Chrabascz	6 – Dunham	2 – Tied	Verizon Center (13,011); Washington, D.C.
Feb 11; 9:00 pm, FS1	Xavier	L 50–64	12–12 (2–10)	14 – Brown	6 – Woods	3 – Dunham	Hinkle Fieldhouse (6,868); Indianapolis, IN
Feb 13; 7:00 pm, CBSSN	No. 18 Creighton	L 63–68	12–13 (2–11)	16 – Dunham	12 – Woods	4 – Barlow	Hinkle Fieldhouse (7,805); Indianapolis, IN
Feb 18; 9:00 pm, FS1	at St. John's	L 52–77	12–14 (2–12)	16 – Marshall	7 – Tied	2 – Tied	Madison Square Garden (7,002); New York, NY
Feb 23; 6:00 pm, FS1	Providence	L 81–87	12–15 (2–13)	25 – Dunham	10 – Woods	8 – Barlow	Hinkle Fieldhouse (6,857); Indianapolis, IN
Feb 26; 8:00 pm, FS1	at No. 8 Villanova	L 48–67	12–16 (2–14)	12 – Dunham	7 – Dunham	3 – Tied	The Pavilion (6,500); Villanova, PA
Mar 6; 7:00 pm, FS1	at DePaul	W 79–46	13–16 (3–14)	19 – Barlow	9 – Dunham	3 – Tied	Allstate Arena (6,206); Rosemont, IL
Mar 8; 4:30 pm, FS1	Seton Hall	W 71–54	14–16 (4–14)	29 – Dunham	9 – Woods	4 – Barlow	Hinkle Fieldhouse (7,670); Indianapolis, IN
Big East tournament
Mar 12; 7:00 pm, FS1	vs. Seton Hall; First round	L 50–51	14–17	22 – Marshall	12 – Woods	6 – Barlow	Madison Square Garden (13,177); New York, NY
*Non-conference game. ^{#}Rankings from AP Poll. (#) Tournament seedings in parentheses. All times are in Eastern Time. BTN = Big Ten Network. FS1 = Fox Sports 1. FS2 = Fox Sports 2. FSN = Fox Sports Network (Regional).

=== Awards ===
Name	Award(s)
Alex Barlow	Big East Scholar Athlete of the Year; Academic All-District
Andrew Chrabascz	Big East All-Rookie Team
Kellen Dunham	All-Big East Second Team; Big East Player of the Week - Dec. 16; Old Spice Classic All-Tournament Team
