= 2013–14 Seton Hall Pirates men's basketball team =

American college basketball season

2013–14 Seton Hall Pirates men's basketball
- Conference: Big East Conference
- Record: 17–17 (6–12 Big East)
- Head coach: Kevin Willard
- Assistant coaches: Shaheen Holloway; Fred Hill; Oliver Antgua
- Home arena: Prudential Center; Walsh Gymnasium

2013–14 Big East men's basketball standings
	Conf.				Overall
Team	W		L	PCT	W		L	PCT
No. 6 Villanova	16	–	2	.889	29	–	5	.853
No. 16 Creighton	14	–	4	.778	27	–	8	.771
Providence †	10	–	8	.556	23	–	12	.657
Xavier	10	–	8	.556	21	–	13	.618
St. John's	10	–	8	.556	20	–	13	.606
Marquette	9	–	9	.500	17	–	15	.531
Georgetown	8	–	10	.444	18	–	15	.545
Seton Hall	6	–	12	.333	17	–	17	.500
Butler	4	–	14	.222	14	–	17	.452
DePaul	3	–	15	.167	12	–	21	.364
† 2014 Big East tournament winner Rankings from AP poll Source:

The 2013–14 Seton Hall Pirates men's basketball team represented Seton Hall University during the 2013–14 NCAA Division I men's basketball season. The Pirates, led by fourth head coach Kevin Willard, played its home games in Newark, New Jersey at the Prudential Center and are members of the newly reorganized Big East Conference. They finished the season 17–17, 6–12 in Big East play to finish in eighth place. They advanced to the semifinals of the Big East tournament where they lost to Providence.

== Roster ==
2013–14 Seton Hall Pirates men's basketball team
Players
Coaches

Pos.	#	Name	Height	Weight	Year	Hometown
G	1	Tom Maayan	6 ft 2 in (1.88 m)	175 lb (79 kg)	So	Galilee, Israel
F	2	Brandon Mobley	6 ft 9 in (2.06 m)	215 lb (98 kg)	Jr	Savannah, Georgia
G	4	Sterling Gibbs	6 ft 2 in (1.88 m)	185 lb (84 kg)	RS So	Scotch Plains, New Jersey
F	13	Haralds Kārlis	6 ft 6 in (1.98 m)	210 lb (95 kg)	Jr	Riga, Latvia
G	15	Hakeem Harris	6 ft 1 in (1.85 m)	190 lb (86 kg)	Jr	Bergenfield, New Jersey
C	21	Gene Teague	6 ft 9 in (2.06 m)	270 lb (122 kg)	RS Sr	Vineland, New Jersey
G/F	22	Brian Oliver	6 ft 7 in (2.01 m)	225 lb (102 kg)	RS Sr	Glassboro, New Jersey
G/F	23	Fuquan Edwin	6 ft 6 in (1.98 m)	215 lb (98 kg)	Sr	Paterson, New Jersey
F	25	Rashed Anthony	6 ft 8 in (2.03 m)	225 lb (102 kg)	Fr	Cordova, South Carolina
G	30	Jaren Sina	6 ft 2 in (1.88 m)	180 lb (82 kg)	Fr	Lake Hopatcong, New Jersey
F	33	Patrik Auda	6 ft 9 in (2.06 m)	235 lb (107 kg)	RS Jr	Brno, Czech Republic
G/F	45	Stephane Manga	6 ft 6 in (1.98 m)	230 lb (104 kg)	Jr	Orléans, France
C	50	Aaron Geramipoor	6 ft 11 in (2.11 m)	245 lb (111 kg)	Sr	Manchester, England

Head coach

- Kevin Willard (Pittsburgh)

Assistant coach(es)

- Shaheen Holloway (Seton Hall)
- Fred Hill (Montclair State)
- Oliver Antigua (Pittsburgh)

Legend

- (C) Team captain
- (S) Suspended
- (I) Ineligible
- (W) Walk-on
- Injured
- Current redshirt

== Schedule ==
Date time, TV	Opponent	Result	Record	Site (attendance) city, state
Exhibition
11/02/2013*; 6:00 pm	Caldwell	W 67–49	–	Walsh Gymnasium (1,623); South Orange, New Jersey
Regular season
11/09/2013*; 6:00 pm, FS2	Niagara; Coaches Vs. Cancer Classic	W 83–72	1–0	Prudential Center (6,523); Newark, New Jersey
11/13/2013*; 7:00 pm, FS2	Kent State; Coaches Vs. Cancer Classic	W 78–76	2–0	Prudential Center (5,601); Newark, New Jersey
11/16/2013*; 3:00 pm	at Mercer	L 74–77 ^{2OT}	2–1	Hawkins Arena (2,057); Macon, Georgia
11/18/2013*; 8:00 pm, FS1	Monmouth	W 82–66	3–1	Prudential Center (5,679); Newark, New Jersey
11/22/2013*; 7:00 pm, truTV	vs. Oklahoma; Coaches Vs. Cancer semifinals	L 85–86	3–2	Barclays Center (6,115); Brooklyn, New York
11/23/2013*; 7:10 pm, truTV	vs. Virginia Tech; Coaches Vs. Cancer 3rd place game	W 68–67	4–2	Barclays Center (6,098); Brooklyn, New York
12/01/2013*; 2:00 pm, FS1	Fairleigh Dickinson	L 54–58	4–3	Prudential Center (6,286); Newark, New Jersey
12/05/2013*; 7:00 pm, FS1	LIU Brooklyn	W 92–81	5–3	Prudential Center (6,112); Newark, New Jersey
12/08/2013*; 8:00 pm, ESPNU	at Rutgers; Rivalry	W 77–71	6–3	The RAC (5,210); Piscataway, New Jersey
12/10/2013*; 9:00 pm, FS1	NJIT	W 71–55	7–3	Prudential Center (6,443); Newark, New Jersey
12/14/2013*; 12:00 pm, FSN	Saint Peter's	L 80–83 ^{OT}	7–4	Prudential Center (6,725); Newark, New Jersey
12/22/2013*; 5:00 pm, FS1	Eastern Washington	W 92–70	8–4	Prudential Center (6,190); Newark, New Jersey
12/27/2013*; 8:00 pm, FS1	Lafayette	W 90–58	9–4	Walsh Gymnasium (1,779); South Orange, New Jersey
12/31/2013; 2:30 pm, FS1	at Providence	W 81–80 ^{2OT}	10–4 (1–0)	Dunkin' Donuts Center (9,568); Providence, Rhode Island
01/04/2014; 3:00 pm, FS1	Creighton	W 79–66	10–5 (1–1)	Prudential Center (7,060); Newark, New Jersey
01/08/2014; 7:00 pm, CBSSN	No. 8 Villanova	L 67–83	10–6 (1–2)	Prudential Center (8,546); Newark, New Jersey
01/11/2014; 2:00 pm, FSN	at Marquette	L 66–67	10–7 (1–3)	BMO Harris Bradley Center (15,581); Milwaukee
01/18/2014; 12:00 pm, FS1	at Georgetown	W 67–57	11–7 (2–3)	Verizon Center (9,786); Washington, D.C.
01/23/2014; 7:00 pm, CBSSN	at St. John's	L 76–77	11–8 (2–4)	Carnesecca Arena (5,016); Queens, New York
01/25/2014; 6:00 pm, CBSSN	DePaul	W 86–69	12–8 (3–4)	Prudential Center (8,307); Newark, New Jersey
01/29/2014; 9:00 pm, FS1	Butler	L 57–64	12–9 (3–5)	Prudential Center (5,826); Newark, New Jersey
02/01/2014; 12:00 pm, CBSSN	at Xavier	W 68–60	13–9 (4–5)	Cintas Center (10,063); Cincinnati
02/07/2014; 7:00 pm, FS1	Villanova	L 53–70	13–10 (4–6)	The Pavilion (6,500); Villanova, Pennsylvania
02/11/2014; 7:00 pm, FS1	Marquette	L 66–77	13–11 (4–7)	Prudential Center (6,342); Newark, New Jersey
02/13/2014; 9:00 pm, FS1	St. John's	L 67–68	13–12 (4–8)	Prudential Center (5,636); Newark, New Jersey
02/20/2014; 9:00 pm, CBSSN	Georgetown	W 82–67	14–12 (5–8)	Prudential Center (6,590); Newark, New Jersey
02/23/2014; 5:00 pm, FSN	at Creighton	L 71–72	14–13 (5–9)	CenturyLink Center (18,742); Omaha, Nebraska
02/25/2014; 9:00 pm, FS1	at DePaul	L 60–65	14–14 (5–10)	Allstate Arena (5,827); Rosemont, Illinois
02/28/2013; 7:00 pm, CBSSN	Providence	L 69–74	14–15 (5–11)	Prudential Center (8,125); Newark, New Jersey
03/03/2014; 7:00 pm, FS1	Xavier	W 71–62	15–15 (6–11)	Prudential Center (6,286); Newark, New Jersey
03/08/2014; 4:30 pm, FS1	at Butler	L 54–71	15–16 (6–12)	Hinkle Fieldhouse (7,670); Indianapolis
Big East tournament
03/12/2014; 7:00 pm, FS1	vs. Butler; First round	W 51–50	16–16	Madison Square Garden (13,177); New York City
03/13/2014; 12:00 pm, FS1	vs. No. 3 Villanova; Quarterfinals	W 64–63	17–16	Madison Square Garden (14,925); New York
03/14/2014; 7:00 pm, FS1	vs. Providence; Semifinals	L 74–80	17–17	Madison Square Garden (15,580); New York
*Non-conference game. ^{#}Rankings from AP Poll. (#) Tournament seedings in parentheses. All times are in Eastern Time.
