= 2013–14 Xavier Musketeers men's basketball team =

American college basketball season

2013–14 Xavier Musketeers men's basketball

NCAA tournament, First Four
- Conference: Big East Conference
- Record: 21–13 (10–8 Big East)
- Head coach: Chris Mack (5th season)
- Assistant coaches: Rich Carter; Mike Pegues; Travis Steele
- Home arena: Cintas Center

2013–14 Big East men's basketball standings
	Conf.				Overall
Team	W		L	PCT	W		L	PCT
No. 6 Villanova	16	–	2	.889	29	–	5	.853
No. 16 Creighton	14	–	4	.778	27	–	8	.771
Providence †	10	–	8	.556	23	–	12	.657
Xavier	10	–	8	.556	21	–	13	.618
St. John's	10	–	8	.556	20	–	13	.606
Marquette	9	–	9	.500	17	–	15	.531
Georgetown	8	–	10	.444	18	–	15	.545
Seton Hall	6	–	12	.333	17	–	17	.500
Butler	4	–	14	.222	14	–	17	.452
DePaul	3	–	15	.167	12	–	21	.364
† 2014 Big East tournament winner Rankings from AP poll Source:

The 2013–14 Xavier Musketeers men's basketball team represented Xavier University during the 2013–14 NCAA Division I men's basketball season. Led by fifth year head coach Chris Mack, they played their games at the Cintas Center and were first year members of the newly reorganized Big East Conference. They finished the season 21–13, 10–8 in Big East play to finish in a three-way tie for third place. They advanced to the semifinals of the Big East tournament where they lost to Creighton. They received an at-large bid to the NCAA tournament where they lost in the First Round ("First Four") to NC State.

== Previous season ==
The Musketeers finished the 2012–13 season with a record of 17–14, 9–7 in Atlantic 10 play for a tie for sixth place. They lost in the first round of the A-10 tournament to Saint Joseph's. This season marked Xavier's final season in the A-10.

== Roster ==
2013–14 Xavier Musketeers men's basketball team
Players
Coaches

Pos.	#	Name	Height	Weight	Year	Hometown
G	0	Semaj Christon	6 ft 3 in (1.91 m)	190 lb (86 kg)	So	Cincinnati, Ohio
F	1	Jalen Reynolds	6 ft 9 in (2.06 m)	222 lb (101 kg)	Fr	Livonia, Michigan
F	2	James Farr	6 ft 9 in (2.06 m)	237 lb (108 kg)	So	Evanston, Illinois
G	3	Brandon Randolph	6 ft 1 in (1.85 m)	190 lb (86 kg)	Fr	Inglewood, California
G	5	Remy Abell (redshirt)	6 ft 4 in (1.93 m)	200 lb (91 kg)	Jr	Louisville, KY
G	11	Dee Davis	6 ft 0 in (1.83 m)	161 lb (73 kg)	Jr	Bloomington, Indiana
G	14	Tim Whelan	5 ft 9 in (1.75 m)	160 lb (73 kg)	Sr	Cincinnati, Ohio
G	15	Myles Davis	6 ft 2 in (1.88 m)	195 lb (88 kg)	Fr	Plainfield, New Jersey
F	20	Justin Martin	6 ft 6 in (1.98 m)	205 lb (93 kg)	RS Jr	Indianapolis, Indiana
F	21	Tim Stainbrook (W)	6 ft 5 in (1.96 m)	180 lb (82 kg)	Fr	Bay Village, Ohio
G	22	Landen Amos	6 ft 4 in (1.93 m)	185 lb (84 kg)	Sr	Chicago, Illinois
F	24	Kamall Richards	6 ft 6 in (1.98 m)	210 lb (95 kg)	Fr	Brooklyn, NY
F	31	Isaiah Philmore	6 ft 8 in (2.03 m)	230 lb (104 kg)	RS Sr	Bel Air, Maryland
F	32	Kevin Coker	6 ft 6 in (1.98 m)	200 lb (91 kg)	So	Plainfield, Illinois
F	35	Erik Stenger	6 ft 8 in (2.03 m)	207 lb (94 kg)	RS Sr	Cincinnati, Ohio
F	40	Matt Stainbrook	6 ft 10 in (2.08 m)	263 lb (119 kg)	RS Jr	Bay Village, Ohio

Head coach

- Chris Mack (Xavier)

Assistant coach(es)

- Mike Pegues (Delaware)
- Travis Steele (Butler)
- Rich Carter (Michigan State)

Legend

- (C) Team captain
- (S) Suspended
- (I) Ineligible
- (W) Walk-on
- Injured
- Current redshirt

Roster
Last update: 2012-10-21

=== Departures ===
Name	Number	Pos.	Height	Weight	Year	Hometown	Notes
Joe Schuessler	3	G	6'2"	175	RS Freshman	Glen Ellyn, Illinois	No longer on team roster
Travis Taylor	4	F	6'8"	216	Senior	Union, New Jersey	Graduated
Brad Redford	12	G	6'1"	182	Senior	Frankenmuth, Michigan	Graduated
Jeff Robinson	21	F	6'10"	225	Senior	Indianapolis, Indiana	Graduated

== Schedule ==
Date time, TV	Rank^{#}	Opponent^{#}	Result	Record	Site (attendance) city, state
Exhibition
November 2, 2013*; 4:00 pm		Quincy (IL)	W 84–54	–	Cintas Center (N/A); Cincinnati, OH
Regular season
November 8, 2013*; 7:00 pm, FSN		Gardner–Webb	W 83–59	1–0	Cintas Center (10,250); Cincinnati, OH
November 12, 2013*; 9:00 pm, FS1		Tennessee	W 67–63	2–0	Cintas Center (9,878); Cincinnati, OH
November 15, 2013*; 8:00 pm, FS2		Morehead State	W 79–56	3–0	Cintas Center (9,528); Cincinnati, OH
November 20, 2013*; 8:00 pm, FS1		Miami (OH)	W 77–51	4–0	Cintas Center (9,514); Cincinnati, OH
November 25, 2013*; 7:00 pm, FS1		Abilene Christian; Battle 4 Atlantis Opening Round	W 93–65	5–0	Cintas Center (9,265); Cincinnati, OH
November 28, 2013*; 7:00 pm, NBCSN		vs. No. 23 Iowa; Battle 4 Atlantis First Round	L 74–77 ^{OT}	5–1	Imperial Arena (2,258); Nassau, BAH
November 29, 2013*; 3:00 pm, AXS TV		vs. Tennessee; Battle 4 Atlantis Consolation 2nd Round	L 49–64	5–2	Imperial Arena (1,573); Nassau, BAH
November 30, 2013*; 1:00 pm, AXS TV		vs. USC; Battle 4 Atlantis 7th place game	L 78–84	5–3	Imperial Arena (1,393); Nassau, BAH
December 7, 2013*; 2:00 pm, FS1		Bowling Green	W 85–73 ^{OT}	6–3	Cintas Center (9,270); Cincinnati, OH
December 10, 2013*; 2:00 pm, FS1		Evansville	W 63–60	7–2	Cintas Center (9,086); Cincinnati, OH
December 14, 2013*; 8:00 pm, FS1		vs. Cincinnati; Skyline Chilli Crosstown Classic	W 64–47	8–3	U.S. Bank Arena (10,250); Cincinnati, OH
December 21, 2013*; 7:00 pm, CSS		at Alabama	W 77–74	9–3	Coleman Coliseum (10,477); Tuscaloosa, AL
December 28, 2013*; 5:00 pm, FS1		Wake Forest; Skip Prosser Classic	W 68–53	10–3	Cintas Center (10,064); Cincinnati, OH
Big East Conference Regular season
December 31, 2013; 12:00 pm, FS1		St. John's	W 70–60	11–3 (1–0)	Cintas Center (10,250); Cincinnati, OH
January 4, 2014; 2:00 pm, FSN		Butler	W 79–68	12–3 (2–0)	Cintas Center (10,250); Cincinnati, OH
January 9, 2014; 9:00 pm, FS1		Marquette	W 86–79	13–3 (3–0)	Cintas Center (9,630); Cincinnati, OH
January 12, 2014; 3:00 pm, CBSSN		at Creighton	L 89–95	13–4 (3–1)	CenturyLink Center (17,589); Omaha, NE
January 15, 2014; 7:00 pm, CBSSN		Georgetown	W 80–67	14–4 (4–1)	Cintas Center (10,250); Cincinnati, OH
January 20, 2014; 4:00 pm, FSN		at DePaul	W 84–74	15–4 (5–1)	Allstate Arena (6,531); Rosemont, IL
January 25, 2014; 12:00 pm, FS1		at Providence	L 72–81	15–5 (5–2)	Dunkin Donuts Center (11,112); Providence, RI
February 1, 2014; 12:00 pm, CBSSN		Seton Hall	L 60–68	15–6 (5–3)	Cintas Center (10,063); Cincinnati, OH
February 3, 2014; 7:00 pm, FS1		at No. 6 Villanova	L 58–81	15–7 (5–4)	The Pavilion (6,500); Villanova, PA
February 8, 2014; 2:00 pm, FS1		Providence	W 59–53	16–7 (6–4)	Cintas Center (10,250); Cincinnati, OH
February 11, 2014; 9:00 pm, FS1		at Butler	W 64-50	17–7 (7–4)	Hinkle Fieldhouse (6,868); Indianapolis, IN
February 15, 2014; 6:00 pm, FOX		at Marquette	L 72-81	17–8 (7–5)	BMO Harris Bradley Center (18,644); Milwaukee, WI
February 19, 2014; 7:00 pm, CBSSN		DePaul	W 83-64	18–8 (8–5)	Cintas Center (9,752); Cincinnati, OH
February 22, 2014; 11:30 am, FS2/FS1 (Note: Originally scheduled to air on Fox Sports 1, the first 30 minutes of the game were broadcast on Fox Sports 2 due to a scheduling conflict with a broadcast of automobile racing practice runs on Fox Sports 1. The broadcast switched to Fox Sports 1 at 12:00 noon EST with the game in progress.)		at Georgetown	L 52–74	18–9 (8–6)	Verizon Center (11,854); Washington, D.C.
February 25, 2014; 7:00 pm, FS1		at St. John's	W 65-53	19–9 (9–6)	Madison Square Garden (6,707); New York City, NY
March 1, 2014; 5:00 pm, FS1		No. 9 Creighton	W 75-69	20–9 (10–6)	Cintas Center (10,483); Cincinnati, OH
March 3, 2014; 7:00 pm, FS1		at Seton Hall	L 62-71	20–10 (10–7)	Prudential Center (6,286); Newark, NJ
March 6, 2014; 7:00 pm, FS1		No. 6 Villanova	L 70-77	20–11 (10–8)	Cintas Center (10,340); Cincinnati, OH
Big East tournament
March 13, 2014; 9:30 pm, FS1	(3)	vs. (6) Marquette; Quarterfinals	W 68–65	21–11	Madison Square Garden (13,807); New York City, NY
March 14, 2014; 9:30 pm, FS1	(3)	vs. (2) No. 14 Creighton; Semifinals	L 78–86	21–12	Madison Square Garden (15,580); New York City, NY
NCAA tournament
March 18, 2014*; 9:10 pm, truTV	(12 MW)	vs. (12 MW) NC State; First Four	L 59–74	21–13	University of Dayton Arena (12,077); Dayton, OH
*Non-conference game. ^{#}Rankings from AP Poll. (#) Tournament seedings in parentheses. All times are in Eastern Time. (#) denote seed within region MW=Midwest.
