= 2013–14 St. John's Red Storm men's basketball team =

American college basketball season

2013–14 St. John's Red Storm men's basketball

NIT, First Round
- Conference: Big East Conference
- Record: 20–13 (10–8 Big East)
- Head coach: Steve Lavin (4th year)
- Assistant coaches: Jim Whitesell; Tony Chiles; Rico Hines
- Home arena: Carnesecca Arena; Madison Square Garden

2013–14 Big East men's basketball standings
	Conf.				Overall
Team	W		L	PCT	W		L	PCT
No. 6 Villanova	16	–	2	.889	29	–	5	.853
No. 16 Creighton	14	–	4	.778	27	–	8	.771
Providence †	10	–	8	.556	23	–	12	.657
Xavier	10	–	8	.556	21	–	13	.618
St. John's	10	–	8	.556	20	–	13	.606
Marquette	9	–	9	.500	17	–	15	.531
Georgetown	8	–	10	.444	18	–	15	.545
Seton Hall	6	–	12	.333	17	–	17	.500
Butler	4	–	14	.222	14	–	17	.452
DePaul	3	–	15	.167	12	–	21	.364
† 2014 Big East tournament winner Rankings from AP poll Source:

The 2013–14 St. John's Red Storm men's basketball team represented St. John's University during the 2013–14 NCAA Division I men's basketball season. The team was coached by Steve Lavin in his fourth year at the school. Saint John's home games were played at Carnesecca Arena and Madison Square Garden and the team was a founding member of the new Big East Conference. They finished the season 20–13, 10–8 in Big East play to finish in three-way tie for third place. They lost in the quarterfinals of the Big East tournament to Providence. They were invited to the National Invitation Tournament, where they lost to Robert Morris in the first round.

== Off season ==
=== Departures ===
Name	Number	Pos.	Height	Weight	Year	Hometown	Notes
Amir Garrett	22	F	6'6"	190	Sophomore	Los Angeles, California	Transferred to Cal State Northridge
Jamal White	30	G	6'4"	210	Senior	Roosevelt, New York	Graduated

=== Class of 2013 signees ===
College recruiting information
Name	Hometown	School	Height	Weight	Commit date
Rysheed Jordan; PG	Philadelphia, PA	Roberts Vaux High School	6 ft 4 in (1.93 m)	175 lb (79 kg)	Apr 11, 2013
Rysheed Jordan; PG	Recruit ratings: Scout: Rivals: (92)				
Overall recruit ranking:
Note: In many cases, Scout, Rivals, 247Sports, On3, and ESPN may conflict in their listings of height and weight.; In these cases, the average was taken. ESPN grades are on a 100-point scale.; Sources: "2013 Team Ranking". Rivals.

== Roster ==
2013–14 St. John's Red Storm men's basketball team
Players
Coaches

Pos.	#	Name	Height	Weight	Year	Previous school	Hometown
G	0	Jamal Branch	6 ft 3 in (1.91 m)	176 lb (80 kg)	Jr	Grace Prep/Texas A&M	Kansas City, MO
G	1	Phil Greene	6 ft 2 in (1.88 m)	180 lb (82 kg)	Jr	IMG Academy	Chicago, IL
G/F	2	Marc-Antoine Bourgault	6 ft 6 in (1.98 m)	216 lb (98 kg)	Sr	Notre Dame Prep/Monroe	Saint-Malo, France
F/C	3	God'sgift Achiuwa	6 ft 8 in (2.03 m)	236 lb (107 kg)	RS Sr	Erie C.C.	Port Harcourt, Nigeria
F	4	Christian Jones (redshirt)	6 ft 7 in (2.01 m)	228 lb (103 kg)	So	IMG Academy	Arlington, TX
G	5	David Lipscomb (W) (redshirt)	6 ft 2 in (1.88 m)	175 lb (79 kg)	So	Wheeler	Riverdale, GA
G/F	10	Max Hooper	6 ft 6 in (1.98 m)	202 lb (92 kg)	RS So	Brewster Academy/Harvard	Carmel Valley, CA
G	11	D'Angelo Harrison	6 ft 3 in (1.91 m)	203 lb (92 kg)	Jr	Dulles	Missouri City, TX
F/C	12	Chris Obekpa	6 ft 9 in (2.06 m)	219 lb (99 kg)	So	Our Savior New American	Makurdi, Nigeria
F	14	JaKarr Sampson	6 ft 8 in (2.03 m)	206 lb (93 kg)	So	Brewster Academy	Akron, Ohio
G/F	15	Sir'Dominic Pointer	6 ft 5 in (1.96 m)	196 lb (89 kg)	Jr	Quality Education Academy	Detroit, MI
G	23	Rysheed Jordan	6 ft 4 in (1.93 m)	175 lb (79 kg)	Fr	Roberts Vaux	Philadelphia, PA
G	24	Felix Balamou	6 ft 4 in (1.93 m)	189 lb (86 kg)	So	Our Savior New American	Conakry, Guinea
F	33	Orlando Sánchez	6 ft 9 in (2.06 m)	216 lb (98 kg)	Sr	Colegio Nueva Luz/Monroe	Nagua, D.R.
F	35	Khadim Ndiaye (W)	6 ft 6 in (1.98 m)	195 lb (88 kg)	Jr	Christ the King	Queens, NY

Head coach

- Steve Lavin (Chapman)

Assistant coach(es)

- Jim Whitesell
- Rico Hines
- Tony Chiles
- Gene Keady (special asst.)

Legend

- (C) Team captain
- (S) Suspended
- (I) Ineligible
- (W) Walk-on
- Injured
- Current redshirt

== Schedule ==
Date time, TV	Rank^{#}	Opponent^{#}	Result	Record	High points	High rebounds	High assists	Site (attendance) city, state
Exhibition
November 2*; 3:00 pm		San Francisco State	W 82–80	–	29 – Harrison	10 – Sanchez	4 – Sanchez	Carnesecca Arena (3,263); Queens, NY
November 4*; 7:30 pm		Humboldt State	W 106–39	–	24 – Achiuwa	10 – Tied	5 – Pointer	Carnesecca Arena (3,501); Queens, NY
Non-conference regular season
November 8*; 7:00 pm, BTN		vs. No. 20 Wisconsin	L 75–86	0–1	27 – Harrison	7 – Sampson	3 – Jordan	Sanford Pentagon (3,523); Sioux Falls, SD
November 15*; 6:00 pm, FS2		Wagner	W 73–57	1–1	25 – Harrison	8 – Tied	4 – Harrison	Carnesecca Arena (4,337); Queens, NY
November 18*; 8:30 pm, FS1		Bucknell	W 67–63	2–1	16 – Greene IV	6 – 3 Tied	6 – Pointer	Carnesecca Arena (3,963); Queens, NY
November 22*; 9:00 pm, FS1		Monmouth; Barclays Center Classic opening round	W 64–54	3–1	22 – Greene IV	9 – Sampson	6 – Sanchez	Carnesecca Arena (4,185); Queens, NY
November 26*; 7:00 pm, FS1		Longwood; Barclays Center Classic opening round	W 65–47	4–1	18 – Harrison	11 – Sampson	4 – Jordan	Carnesecca Arena (3,531); Queens, NY
November 29*; 7:00 pm		vs. Penn State; Barclays Center Classic semifinals	L 82–89 ^{OT}	4–2	20 – Harrison	13 – Obekpa	5 – Greene IV	Barclays Center (4,231); Brooklyn, NY
November 30*; 2:00 pm, NBCSN		vs. Georgia Tech; Barclays Center Classic third-place game	W 69–58	5–2	21 – Harrison	5 – Obekpa	4 – Branch	Barclays Center (3,088); Brooklyn, NY
December 7*; 1:30 pm, MSG		Fordham; Madison Square Garden Holiday Festival	W 104–58	6–2	19 – Sanchez	9 – Pointer	11 – Pointer	Madison Square Garden (10,803); New York City, NY
December 15*; 12:00 pm, FS1		No. 2 Syracuse	L 63–68	6–3	21 – Harrison	7 – Sanchez	3 – Jordan	Madison Square Garden (16,357); New York City, NY
December 18*; 8:00 pm, FS1		San Francisco	W 81–57	7–3	18 – Harrison	7 – Obekpa	4 – Jordan	Carnesecca Arena (4,282); Queens, NY
December 21*; 2:00 pm, FS1		Youngstown State	W 96–87	8–3	29 – Harrison	13 – Sampson	4 – Tied	Carnesecca Arena (4,248); Queens, NY
December 28*; 2:30 pm, FS1		vs. Columbia; Brooklyn Hoops Winter Festival	W 65–59	9–3	15 – Harrison	9 – Sanchez	2 – 3 Tied	Barclays Center (7,203); Brooklyn, NY
December 31; 12:00 pm, FS1		at Xavier	L 60–70	9–4 (0–1)	21 – Harrison	8 – Tied	3 – Branch	Cintas Center (10,250); Cincinnati, OH
January 4; 1:00 pm, FS1		at Georgetown	L 60–77	9–5 (0–2)	13 – Hooper	7 – Tied	3 – Harrison	Verizon Center (10,164); Washington, D.C.
January 11; 1:00 pm, FS1		No. 8 Villanova	L 67–74	9–6 (0–3)	22 – Harrison	9 – Sampson	2 – Tied	Madison Square Garden (11,707); New York City, NY
January 14; 1:00 pm, FS1		at DePaul	L 75–77	9–7 (0–4)	24 – Harrison	6 – Jordan	4 – Jordan	Allstate Arena (6,102); Rosemont, IL
January 16; 7:00 pm, FS1		Providence	L 83–84 ^{2OT}	9–8 (0–5)	16 – Sampson	8 – Tied	4 – Tied	Carnesecca Arena (4,709); Queens, NY
January 18*; 6:00 pm, FS1		Dartmouth	W 69–55	10–8 (0–5)	16 – Greene IV	10 – Sanchez	3 – Harrison	Carnesecca Arena (5,505); Queens, NY
January 23; 7:00 pm, CBSSN		Seton Hall	W 77–76	11–8 (1–5)	16 – 3 Tied	6 – Harrison	6 – Jordan	Carnesecca Arena (5,016); Queens, NY
January 25; 4:00 pm, FSN		at Butler	W 69–52	12–8 (2–5)	20 – Sampson	9 – Sanchez	8 – Branch	Hinkle Fieldhouse (10,000); Indianapolis, IN
January 28; 4:00 pm, FS1		at No. 20 Creighton	L 60–63	12–9 (2–6)	15 – Harrison	6 – Tied	3 – Pointer	CenturyLink Center (17,515); Omaha, NE
February 1; 12:30 pm, FS1		Marquette	W 74–59	13–9 (3–6)	27 – Harrison	7 – Obepka	7 – Jordan	Madison Square Garden (12,561); New York City, NY
February 4; 7:00 pm, FS1		at Providence	W 86–76	14–9 (4–6)	22 – Harrison	7 – Sampson	6 – Jordan	Dunkin' Donuts Center (8,798); Providence, RI
February 9; 7:00 pm, FS1		No. 12 Creighton	W 70–65	15–9 (5–6)	19 – Harrison	7 – Sanchez	7 – Jordan	Madison Square Garden (6,739); New York City, NY
February 13; 9:00 pm, FS1		at Seton Hall	W 68–67	16–9 (6–6)	12 – Harrison	6 – Tied	4 – Sampson	Prudential Center (5,636); Newark, NJ
February 16; 7:00 pm, FS1		Georgetown	W 82–60	17–9 (7–6)	24 – Tied	6 – Harrison	4 – Obepka	Madison Square Garden (10,340); New York City, NY
February 18; 9:00 pm, FS1		Butler	W 77–52	18–9 (8–6)	23 – Sampson	11 – Sanchez	5 – Branch	Madison Square Garden (7,002); New York City, NY
February 22; 1:30 pm, FS1		at No. 9 Villanova	L 54–57	18–10 (8–7)	15 – Harrison	10 – Sampson	3 – Greene IV	Wells Fargo Center (17,124); Philadelphia, PA
February 25; 7:00 pm, FS1		Xavier	L 53–65	18–11 (8–8)	14 – Sampson	6 – Pointer	4 – Harrison	Madison Square Garden (6,707); New York City, NY
March 2; 12:00 pm, CBSSN		DePaul	W 72–64	19–11 (9–8)	25 – Harrison	11 – Obepka	4 – Harrison	Madison Square Garden (10,670); New York City, NY
March 8; 12:00 pm, FS1		at Marquette	W 91–90 ^{2OT}	20–11 (10–8)	20 – 3 Tied	9 – Obepka	6 – Jordan	BMO Harris Bradley Center (16,784); Milwaukee, WI
Big East tournament
March 13; 3:30 pm, FS1		vs. Providence; Quarterfinals	L 74–79	20–12	21 – Harrison	12 – Sanchez	4 – Harrison	Madison Square Garden (14,925); New York City, NY
NIT
March 18*; 7:00 pm, ESPNU	No. (1)	(8) Robert Morris; First round	L 78–89	20–13	22 – Branch	8 – Sanchez	3 – 3 Tied	Carnesecca Arena (1,027); Queens, NY
*Non-conference game. ^{#}Rankings from AP Poll, (#) during NIT is seed within region. (#) Tournament seedings in parentheses. All times are in Eastern Time.
