= 2013–14 DePaul Blue Demons men's basketball team =

American college basketball season

2013–14 DePaul Blue Demons men's basketball
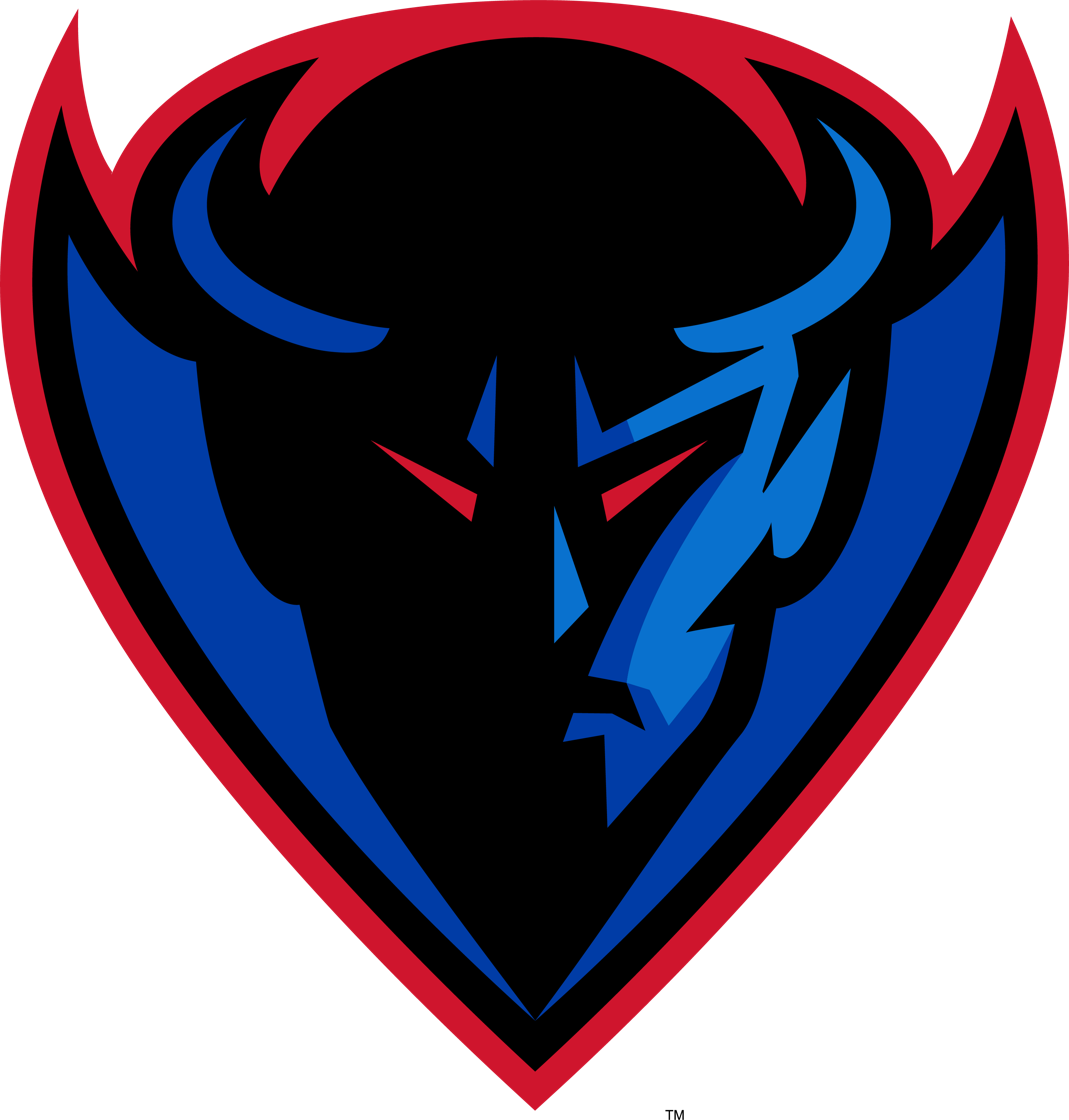
- Conference: Big East Conference
- Record: 12–21 (3–15 Big East)
- Head coach: Oliver Purnell (4th season)
- Assistant coaches: Ron Bradley; Billy Garrett; Renard Phillips
- Home arena: Allstate Arena; McGrath–Phillips Arena

2013–14 Big East men's basketball standings
	Conf.				Overall
Team	W		L	PCT	W		L	PCT
No. 6 Villanova	16	–	2	.889	29	–	5	.853
No. 16 Creighton	14	–	4	.778	27	–	8	.771
Providence †	10	–	8	.556	23	–	12	.657
Xavier	10	–	8	.556	21	–	13	.618
St. John's	10	–	8	.556	20	–	13	.606
Marquette	9	–	9	.500	17	–	15	.531
Georgetown	8	–	10	.444	18	–	15	.545
Seton Hall	6	–	12	.333	17	–	17	.500
Butler	4	–	14	.222	14	–	17	.452
DePaul	3	–	15	.167	12	–	21	.364
† 2014 Big East tournament winner Rankings from AP poll Source:

The 2013–14 DePaul Blue Demons men's basketball team represented DePaul University during the 2013–14 NCAA Division I men's basketball season. The Blue Demons, led by fourth year head coach Oliver Purnell, played their home games at the Allstate Arena, with two home games at McGrath-Phillips Arena, and were members of the newly reorganized Big East Conference. They finished the season 12–21, 3–15 in Big East play to finish in last place. They advanced to the quarterfinals of the Big East tournament where they lost to Creighton.

== Roster ==
Number	Name	Position	Height	Weight	Year	Hometown
0	R. J. Curington	Guard	6–4	205	Freshman	Dyer, Indiana
1	DeJuan Marrero	Forward	6–5	219	Freshman	Gary, Indiana
2	Tommy Hamilton Jr.	Center	6–10	284	Freshman	Chicago, Illinois
3	Myke Henry	Forward	6–6	210	Junior	Chicago, Illinois
4	Edwind McGhee	Guard	6–3	205	Senior	Champaign, Illinois
5	Billy Garrett Jr.	Guard	6–5	194	Freshman	Chicago, Illinois
11	Forrest Robinson	Forward	6–10	229	Junior	Eastland, Texas
12	Cleveland Melvin	Forward	6–8	208	Senior	Baltimore, Maryland
13	Cory Dolins	Guard	6–0	182	Sophomore	Skokie, Illinois
20	Brandon Young	Guard	6–4	192	Senior	Baltimore, Maryland
21	Jamee Crockett	Forward	6–4	207	Junior	Chicago, Illinois
25	Durrell McDonald	Guard	6–1	169	Sophomore	Las Vegas, Nevada
30	Peter Ryckbosch	Forward	6–9	237	Sophomore	Chicago, Illinois
32	Charles McKinney	Guard	6–3	183	Junior	Evanston, Illinois
42	Greg Sequele	Forward	6–9	215	Junior	Sainte-Rose, Guadeloupe
55	Sandi Marcius	Forward	6–10	255	Senior	Nedelišće, Croatia

== Schedule ==
Date time, TV	Opponent	Result	Record	Site (attendance) city, state
Exhibition
10/29/2013*; 8:00 pm	Lewis	W 84–79	–	McGrath–Phillips Arena (2,824); Chicago, IL
Regular season
11/09/2013*; 7:00 pm, FS2	Grambling State	W 96–58	1–0	McGrath–Phillips Arena (3,254); Chicago, IL
11/13/2013*; 8:00 pm, FS2	Southern Miss; CBE Hall of Fame Classic	L 68–75	1–1	Allstate Arena (5,840); Rosemont, IL
11/16/2013*; 1:00 pm, FSN	Wright State; CBE Hall of Fame Classic	W 81–72	2–1	Allstate Arena (6,162); Rosemont, IL
11/19/2013*; 7:00 pm	at Milwaukee	W 80–71	3–1	U.S. Cellular Arena (3,186); Milwaukee, WI
11/25/2013*; 9:00 pm, ESPN3	vs. No. 12 Wichita State; CBE Hall of Fame Classic semifinals	L 72–90	3–2	Sprint Center (7,682); Kansas City, MO
11/26/2013*; 6:30 pm, ESPNU	vs. Texas; CBE Hall of Fame Classic 3rd place game	L 59–77	3–3	Sprint Center (8,324); Kansas City, MO
12/01/2013*; 4:00 pm, FS1	Oregon State	W 93–81	4–3	Allstate Arena (6,765); Rosemont, IL
12/06/2013*; 6:00 pm, FS1	Arizona State	L 56–78	4–4	Allstate Arena (6,888); Rosemont, IL
12/12/2013*; 8:00 pm, FS1	Florida Atlantic	W 81–70	5–4	Allstate Arena (5,564); Rosemont, IL
12/15/2013*; 3:30 pm, FS1	Chicago State	W 77–70 ^{OT}	6–4	Allstate Arena (6,627); Rosemont, IL
12/18/2013*; 8:00 pm, FS2	Houston Baptist	W 78–58	7–4	Allstate Arena (5,101); Rosemont, IL
12/22/2013*; 7:05 pm, CSNCHI	at Illinois State	L 64–69	7–5	Redbird Arena (5,345); Normal, IL
12/27/2013*; 8:00 pm, BTN	at Northwestern	W 57–56	8–5	Welsh-Ryan Arena (6,819); Evanston, IL
12/31/2013; 4:00 pm, FS1	at Georgetown	L 54–61	8–6 (0–1)	Verizon Center (7,823); Washington, D.C.
01/04/2014; 1:00 pm, CBSSN	at Marquette	L 56–66	8–7 (0–2)	BMO Harris Bradley Center (15,194); Milwaukee, WI
01/07/2014; 8:00 pm, FS1	Creighton	L 62–81	8–8 (0–3)	Allstate Arena (7,104); Rosemont, IL
01/09/2014; 6:00 pm, FS1	at Butler	W 99–94 ^{2OT}	9–8 (1–3)	Hinkle Fieldhouse (6,163); Indianapolis, IN
01/14/2014; 6:00 pm, FS1	St. John's	W 77–75	10–8 (2–3)	Allstate Arena (6,102); Rosemont, IL
01/18/2014; 3:00 pm, FSN	at No. 6 Villanova	L 62–88	10–9 (2–4)	The Pavilion (6,500); Villanova, PA
01/20/2014; 3:00 pm, FSN	Xavier	L 74–84	10–10 (2–5)	Allstate Arena (6,531); Rosemont, IL
01/25/2014; 5:00 pm, CBSSN	at Seton Hall	L 69–86	10–11 (2–6)	Prudential Center (8,307); Newark, NJ
02/01/2014; 12:00 pm, FSN	Providence	L 72–77	10–12 (2–7)	Allstate Arena (7,139); Rosemont, IL
02/03/2014; 8:12 pm, FS1	Georgetown	L 59–71	10–13 (2–8)	Allstate Arena (6,339); Rosemont, IL
02/07/2014; 8:00 pm, FS1	at No. 12 Creighton	L 66–78	10–14 (2–9)	CenturyLink Center (18,323); Omaha, NE
02/12/2014; 6:00 pm, FS1	No. 6 Villanova	L 62–87	10–15 (2–10)	Allstate Arena (7,387); Rosemont, IL
02/15/2014; 1:00 pm, FSN	at Providence	L 61–84	10–16 (2–11)	Dunkin' Donuts Center (12,069); Providence, RI
02/19/2014; 6:00 pm, CBSSN	at Xavier	L 64–83	10–17 (2–12)	Cintas Center (9,752); Cincinnati, OH
02/22/2014; 1:00 pm, CBSSN	Marquette	L 94–96 ^{OT}	10–18 (2–13)	Allstate Arena (9,342); Rosemont, IL
02/25/2014; 8:00 pm, FS1	Seton Hall	W 65–60	11–18 (3–13)	Allstate Arena (5,827); Rosemont, IL
03/02/2014; 11:00 am, FS1	at St. John's	L 64–72	11–19 (3–14)	Madison Square Garden (10,670); New York City, NY
03/06/2014; 8:00 pm, FS1	Butler	L 46–79	11–20 (3–15)	Allstate Arena (6,206); Rosemont, IL
Big East tournament
03/12/2014; 8:30 pm, FS1	vs. Georgetown; First round	W 60–56	12–20	Madison Square Garden (13,177); New York City, NY
03/13/2014; 6:00 pm, FS1	vs. No. 14 Creighton; Quarterfinals	L 62–84	12–21	Madison Square Garden (13,807); New York City, NY
*Non-conference game. ^{#}Rankings from AP Poll. (#) Tournament seedings in parentheses. All times are in Central Time.
