= Semaj Christon =

American basketball player (born 1992)

Free agent
- Position: Point guard

Personal information
- Born: November 1, 1992 (age 34) Cincinnati, Ohio, U.S.
- Listed height: 6 ft 3 in (1.91 m)
- Listed weight: 190 lb (86 kg)

Career information
- High school: Winton Woods (Cincinnati, Ohio); Brewster Academy (Wolfeboro, New Hampshire)
- College: Xavier (2012–2014)
- NBA draft: 2014: 2nd round, 55th overall pick
- Drafted by: Miami Heat
- Playing career: 2014–present

Career history
- 2014–2015: Oklahoma City Blue
- 2015–2016: Consultinvest Pesaro
- 2016–2017: Oklahoma City Thunder
- 2017: →Oklahoma City Blue
- 2017–2018: Guangzhou Long-Lions
- 2018: Santeros de Aguada
- 2018–2019: Hapoel Be'er Sheva
- 2019–2020: Limoges CSP
- 2020: Baskonia
- 2020–2021: Tofaş
- 2021–2022: ratiopharm Ulm
- 2022–2023: Derthona Basket
- 2023–2024: Pallacanestro Brescia
- 2024–2025: Pistoia Basket 2000
- 2025: Vanoli Cremona
- 2025: Elitzur Netanya
- 2025–2026: APU Udine
- 2026: Pallacanestro Cantù

Career highlights
- All-EuroCup Second Team (2022); All-LBA Team (2023); NBA D-League All-Rookie Third Team (2015); NBA D-League All-Star (2015); First-team All-Big East (2014); Second-team All-Atlantic 10 (2013); Atlantic 10 Rookie of the Year (2013)
- Stats at NBA.com
- Stats at Basketball Reference

Semaj Rakim Christon (born November 1, 1992) is an American professional basketball player who last played for Pallacanestro Cantù of the Lega Basket Serie A (LBA). He played college basketball for Xavier, and was taken in the second round of the 2014 NBA Draft.

== High school career ==
The Cincinnati, Ohio, native attended Winton Woods High School with whom he led the Fort Ancient Valley Conference in scoring as a senior with 21 points per game, adding 5.2 assists. He was a District 16 Player of the Year, Fort Ancient Valley Conference West Division Player of the Year, Cincinnati Enquirer All-Star, All-Southwest District Second-Team selection, and Honorable Mention All-State.

In July 2011, Christon committed to Xavier, playing in the Atlantic 10 Conference of the NCAA Division I, but would join the team in 2012, first attending prep school Brewster Academy along with fellow recruit Jalen Reynolds. Christon, rated a four star recruit by Rivals.com, chose Cincinnati college Xavier over reported offers from Illinois, Providence and Georgetown.

At Brewster, he was part of a star-studded lineup that included future NBA players JaKarr Sampson, T. J. Warren and Mitch McGary, serving as the floor general and assist-provider as the school romped to a 32–1 record and a National Prep School Championship, with Christon earning All-NESPAC First Team honours.

During his high school career, Christon also played AAU basketball for Club Ohio, participating in the Under-17 National Championship, and later on for the Cincinnati Knights.

== College career ==
=== 2012–13 season ===
Christon joined Xavier for the 2012–13 season. After missing the first game of the season due to a cut in his elbow getting infected, he made his Musketeer debut against Butler on 13 November 2012, contributing 2 points and 8 assists. His game soon picked up as he had an average of 17.7 points and 5 assists over the next 7 games, finishing the season as Xavier's leader in points (15.2), assists (4.6), steals (1.5) and minutes (34.3), with his 456 total points ranking second among Xavier freshmen through history. His performances earned him personal recognition, he was Rookie of the Year, All-Rookie team and All-Conference Second Team in the Atlantic 10, adding a Kyle Macy Freshmen All-America Team selection by Collegeinsider.com and NABC District 4 Second Team.

=== 2013–14 season ===
Xavier's realignment to the Big East Conference did not deter Christon in 2013–14, on the contrary he improved his scoring average to a mark of 17 points per game, good for 4th in the conference, along with 4.1 assists (sixth best) and 1.4 steals, all on the way to a unanimous All-Big East First Team selection. Entering the Big East tournament with 984 career points, Christon had 18 points in the quarterfinal win against Marquette – a team against which he priorly had scored a career-high 28 points – to become second Musketeer after Byron Larkin to reach 1,000 points as a sophomore. Another 18 points in the semifinal defeat to Creighton led to a Big East All-Tournament Team selection. In the NCAA tournament First Four encounter with NC State, Christon was overshadowed by former teammate T. J. Warren, posting 14 points with 7 turnovers against the former's 25 points as NC State won the game, that would prove to be the last of his college career.

In March 2014, Christon declared himself as an early entrant for the NBA draft, forgoing his two remaining years of college eligibility. Despite speculation that he would withdraw his entry, Christon hired an agent and submitted the paperwork in April 2014, thereby ensuring he wouldn't return to Xavier for his junior season.

Christon finished his collegiate career with 1,034 points in 64 games (16.2 average), adding 281 assists (4.4), he led the Musketeers in scoring and steals during both of the seasons he played and in assists during his freshman season.

== Professional career ==
=== Oklahoma City Blue (2014–2015) ===
Projected to be drafted anywhere between the late first round and late second round, Christon was selected by the Miami Heat with the 55th overall pick in the 2014 NBA draft on June 26. His draft rights were later traded to the Charlotte Hornets, and then again to the Oklahoma City Thunder. He joined the Thunder for the 2014 NBA Summer League where he experienced his first taste of professional basketball.

Christon did not take part in the Thunder's training camp and was instead incorporated into the team's NBA Development League affiliate, the Oklahoma City Blue. In his first professional game, on November 14, 2014, against the Maine Red Claws, he scored 32 points. His good form continued during the season and led him to participate in the D-League All-Star Game in February 2015, contributing 10 points for the Prospects. Christon finished the 2014–15 season with 18.6 points, 3.7 rebounds, 5.7 assists (ninth best in the league), 1.6 steals (13th) in around 35 minutes per game over 44 games played, earning NBA Development League All-Rookie Third Team honours.

In July 2015, Christon re-joined the Thunder for the 2015 NBA Summer League. He performed well at the Orlando event, top-scoring in the fifth place game win over the Los Angeles Clippers with 23, for tournament averages of 15.6 and an unrivaled 6.8 assists. Despite these performances and plaudits from Thunder assistant coach Darko Rajakovic, a contract was not forthcoming, with some speculating that the Thunder – having just signed Cameron Payne at his position – would wait for backup point guard D. J. Augustin's contract to expire in 2016 before signing Christon.

=== Consultinvest Pesaro (2015–2016) ===
Later that summer, Christon moved to the Italian Serie A, signing with Consultinvest Pesaro on August 3, 2015. In 30 games, he averaged 14.3 points, 3.7 assists, 3.3 rebounds and 1.6 steals in 33.2 minutes per game.

=== Oklahoma City Thunder (2016–2017) ===
In July 2016, Christon re-joined the Oklahoma City Thunder for the 2016 NBA Summer League. On August 20, 2016, he officially signed with the Thunder for the first time. On October 26, 2016, he made his NBA debut in a 103–97 win over the Philadelphia 76ers, recording four points, four assists and one rebound in 15 minutes off the bench. On January 2, 2017, he scored a season-high 11 points in a 98–94 loss to the Milwaukee Bucks. During his rookie season, he received multiple assignments to the Oklahoma City Blue, the Thunder's D-League affiliate.

On October 14, 2017, Christon was waived by the Thunder as one of the team's final preseason roster cuts ahead of the 2017–18 season.

=== Guangzhou Long-Lions (2017–2018) ===
On December 2, 2017, Christon signed with the Chinese team Guangzhou Long-Lions. On December 24, 2017, Christon recorded a career-high 45 points, shooting 16-of-31 from the field, along with five rebounds and seven assists in a 118–114 win over the Shanghai Sharks.

On July 6, 2018, Christon joined the Brooklyn Nets for the 2018 NBA Summer League.

=== Santeros de Aguada (2018) ===
On July 31, 2018, Christon signed with the Puerto Rican team Santeros de Aguada for the rest of the 2018 BSN season.

=== Hapoel Be'er Sheva (2018–2019) ===
On September 19, 2018, Christon signed with the Israeli team Hapoel Be'er Sheva for the 2018–19 season. In October 2018, Christon led Be'er Sheva to the 2018 Israeli Basketball League Cup Final, where they eventually lost to Maccabi Rishon LeZion. On November 24, 2018, Christon recorded a season-high 31 points, shooting 5-of-11 from three-point range, along with three rebounds and four assists in an 88–89 loss to Hapoel Jerusalem.

=== Limoges CSP (2019–2020) ===
On July 24, 2019, Christon signed a one-year deal with the French team Limoges CSP.

=== Saski Baskonia (2020) ===
On January 27, 2020, Christon officially signed with Kirolbet Baskonia of the Liga ACB and the EuroLeague. He averaged 9 points, 3.2 rebounds and 2.7 assists per game in ACB competition. The team opted out of Christon's contract on July 1.

=== Tofas (2020–2021) ===
On July 22, 2020, Christon signed with Tofaş of the Turkish Basketbol Süper Ligi (BSL) and the EuroCup.

=== ratiopharm Ulm (2021–2022) ===
On August 27, 2021, Christon signed with ratiopharm Ulm of the German Basketball Bundesliga.

=== Derthona Basket (2022–2023) ===
On June 13, 2022, Christon signed a two-year contract with Derthona Basket of the Italian Lega Basket Serie A.

=== Pallacanestro Brescia (2023–2024) ===
On August 3, 2023, Christon signed with Pallacanestro Brescia of the Italian Lega Basket Serie A.

=== Pistoia Basket 2000 (2024–2025) ===
On September 24, 2024, Christon signed with Pistoia Basket 2000.

=== Vanoli Cremona (2025) ===
On February 28, 2025, he signed with Vanoli Cremona of the Italian Lega Basket Serie A (LBA).

=== APU Udine (2025–2026) ===
On November 29, 2025, he signed with APU Udine of the Lega Basket Serie A (LBA).

=== Pallacanestro Cantù (2026) ===
On June 20, 2026, Christon signed with Pallacanestro Cantù of the Italian Lega Basket Serie A (LBA). On August 26, 2026, Christon and Riccardo Moraschini were named team captains. On November 2, 2026, Christon was issued a precautionary suspension after testing positive for an named substance. He was tested immediately after the game against Napoli three weeks earlier on October 11, 2026. On November 6, 2026, Cantù terminated Christon's contract.

== National team career ==
On November 14, 2017, Christon was named a member of the United States national team for the 2019 FIBA World Cup qualification. Christon led the team to a 2–0 record during the November first-round games, played in both games, averaged 13.5 minutes, 6.5 points, 1.0 rebounds and 2.5 assists per game, shot 44.4 percent from the field, 100 percent (2–2 3pt FGs) percent from 3-point and 100 percent from the foul line (3–3 FTs).

== Career statistics ==
Legend
GP	Games played	GS	Games started	MPG	Minutes per game
FG%	Field goal percentage	3P%	3-point field goal percentage	FT%	Free throw percentage
RPG	Rebounds per game	APG	Assists per game	SPG	Steals per game
BPG	Blocks per game	PPG	Points per game	**Bold**	Career high

=== Regular season ===
Year	Team	GP	GS	MPG	FG%	3P%	FT%	RPG	APG	SPG	BPG	PPG
2016–17	Oklahoma City	64	1	15.2	.345	.190	.548	1.4	2.0	.4	.1	2.9
Career		64	1	15.2	.345	.190	.548	1.4	2.0	.4	.1	2.9

=== Playoffs ===
Year	Team	GP	GS	MPG	FG%	3P%	FT%	RPG	APG	SPG	BPG	PPG
2017	Oklahoma City	2	0	10.5	.400	.333	.000	1.5	2.5	.5	.0	2.5
Career		2	0	10.5	.400	.333	.000	1.5	2.5	.5	.0	2.5

=== Domestic Leagues ===
Year	Team	League	GP	MPG	FG%	3P%	FT%	RPG	APG	SPG	BPG	PPG
2014–15	(United States) Oklahoma City Blue	D-League	46	35.2	.448	.259	.778	3.6	5.8	1.6	.2	18.8
2016–17	(Italy) Consultinvest Pesaro	LBA	30	33.2	.469	.190	.664	3.3	3.7	1.6	.2	14.3
2017–18	(China) Guangzhou Long-Lions	CBA	16	42.9	.474	.230	.835	4.3	5.7	1.8	.3	27.7
2018	(Puerto Rico) Santeros de Aguada	BSN	3	33.5	.500	.389	.812	2.0	4.3	2.0	1.0	18.6
2018–19	(Israel) Hapoel Be'er Sheva	IBPL	8	28.6	.442	.395	.786	2.1	4.0	1.6	.1	18.7

=== College ===
Year	Team	GP	GS	MPG	FG%	3P%	FT%	RPG	APG	SPG	BPG	PPG
2012-13	Xavier	30	29	34.2	.444	.250	**.672**	**2.9**	**4.6**	**1.5**	.1	15.2
2013-14	Xavier	**34**	**34**	**35.3**	**.479**	**.388**	.668	2.7	4.2	1.3	**.2**	**17.0**
Career		64	63	34.8	.462	.338	.670	2.8	4.4	1.4	.2	16.2
