= 2013–14 Marquette Golden Eagles men's basketball team =

American college basketball season

2013–14 Marquette Golden Eagles men's basketball
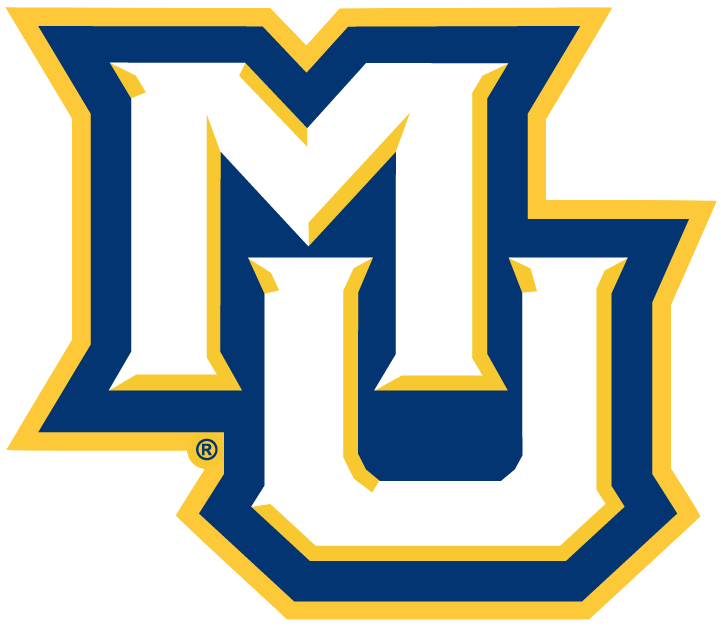
- Conference: Big East Conference|Big East
- Record: 17–15 (9–9 Big East)
- Head coach: Buzz Williams (6th season)
- Assistant coaches: Brad Autry (6th season); Isaac Chew (2nd season); Jerry Wainwright (2nd season)
- Home arena: BMO Harris Bradley Center

2013–14 Big East men's basketball standings
	Conf.				Overall
Team	W		L	PCT	W		L	PCT
No. 6 Villanova	16	–	2	.889	29	–	5	.853
No. 16 Creighton	14	–	4	.778	27	–	8	.771
Providence †	10	–	8	.556	23	–	12	.657
Xavier	10	–	8	.556	21	–	13	.618
St. John's	10	–	8	.556	20	–	13	.606
Marquette	9	–	9	.500	17	–	15	.531
Georgetown	8	–	10	.444	18	–	15	.545
Seton Hall	6	–	12	.333	17	–	17	.500
Butler	4	–	14	.222	14	–	17	.452
DePaul	3	–	15	.167	12	–	21	.364
† 2014 Big East tournament winner Rankings from AP poll Source:

The 2013–14 Marquette Golden Eagles men's basketball team represented Marquette University in the 2013–14 NCAA Division I men's basketball season. Their coach Buzz Williams served in his sixth year as head coach. Marquette played its home games at the BMO Harris Bradley Center in Milwaukee, Wisconsin. Marquette was a member of the newly reorganized Big East Conference after the split of the old Big East because they are part of the Catholic 7. They finished the season 17–15, 9–9 in Big East play to finish in sixth place. They lost in the quarterfinals of the Big East tournament to Xavier. They did not participate in a postseason tournament.

At the end of the season, head coach Buzz Williams resigned to take the head coaching job at Virginia Tech. He was replaced by Duke assistant coach Steve Wojciechowski.

== Preseason ==
=== Recruits ===
College recruiting
Name	Hometown	School	Height	Weight	Commit date
JaJuan Johnson; SG	Memphis, TN	Southwind High School	6 ft 5 in (1.96 m)	185 lb (84 kg)	Nov 2, 2012
JaJuan Johnson; SG	Recruit ratings: Scout: Rivals: (89)				
Deonte Burton; PF	Milwaukee, WI	Harold S. Vincent High School	6 ft 4 in (1.93 m)	228 lb (103 kg)	Sep 2, 2011
Deonte Burton; PF	Recruit ratings: Scout: Rivals: (87)				
Duane Wilson; PG	Milwaukee, WI	Dominican High School	6 ft 4 in (1.93 m)	228 lb (103 kg)	Mar 20, 2012
Duane Wilson; PG	Recruit ratings: Scout: Rivals: (87)				
John Dawson; PG	Clovis, NM	Clovis High School	6 ft 2 in (1.88 m)	195 lb (88 kg)	Mar 20, 2012
John Dawson; PG	Recruit ratings: Scout: Rivals: (74)				
Jameel McKay; PF	Milwaukee, WI	Indian Hills Community College	6 ft 8 in (2.03 m)	195 lb (88 kg)	Jun 2, 2012
Jameel McKay; PF	Recruit ratings: Scout: Rivals: (JC)				
Overall recruit ranking:
Note: In many cases, Scout, Rivals, 247Sports, On3, and ESPN may conflict in their listings of height and weight.; In these cases, the average was taken. ESPN grades are on a 100-point scale.; Sources: "2013 Team Ranking". Rivals.

=== Departures ===
Name	Number	Position	Height	Weight	Year	Hometown	Notes
Jameel McKay	32	F	6-8	210	Junior	Milwaukee, Wisconsin	Left team in preseason
Junior Cadougan	5	G	6-1	205	Senior	Toronto, Ontario	Graduated
Trent Lockett	22	G/F	6-5	210	Senior	Golden Valley, Minnesota	Graduated
Vander Blue	13	G	6-4	200	Junior	Madison, Wisconsin	Declared for NBA draft (undrafted)

== Roster ==
2013–14 Marquette Golden Eagles men's basketball team
Players
Coaches

Pos.	#	Name	Height	Weight	Year	Hometown
F	0	Jamil Wilson	6 ft 7 in (2.01 m)	230 lb (104 kg)	RS Sr	Racine, Wisconsin
G	1	Duane Wilson	6 ft 2 in (1.88 m)	180 lb (82 kg)	Fr	Milwaukee, Wisconsin
G	2	John Dawson	6 ft 2 in (1.88 m)	195 lb (88 kg)	Fr	Clovis, New Mexico
G	4	Todd Mayo	6 ft 3 in (1.91 m)	195 lb (88 kg)	Jr	Huntington, West Virginia
G	5	JaJuan Johnson	6 ft 5 in (1.96 m)	185 lb (84 kg)	Fr	Memphis, Tennessee
F	10	Juan Anderson	6 ft 6 in (1.98 m)	215 lb (98 kg)	Jr	Oakland, California
G	12	Derrick Wilson	6 ft 1 in (1.85 m)	215 lb (98 kg)	Jr	Anchorage, Alaska
G	23	Jake Thomas	6 ft 3 in (1.91 m)	205 lb (93 kg)	RS Sr	Racine, Wisconsin
F	25	Steve Taylor, Jr.	6 ft 7 in (2.01 m)	235 lb (107 kg)	So	Chicago, Illinois
G	30	Deonte Burton	6 ft 4 in (1.93 m)	230 lb (104 kg)	Fr	Milwaukee, Wisconsin
G	34	Dylan Flood	6 ft 4 in (1.93 m)	200 lb (91 kg)	Jr	Lemont, Illinois
C	42	Chris Otule	6 ft 11 in (2.11 m)	275 lb (125 kg)	RS Sr	Richmond, Texas
F	54	Davante Gardner	6 ft 8 in (2.03 m)	290 lb (132 kg)	Sr	Suffolk, Virginia

Head coach

- Buzz Williams (Oklahoma City)

Assistant coach(es)

- Brad Autry (Northwestern Oklahoma State)
- Isaac Chew (Avila)
- Jerry Wainwright (Colorado College)

Legend

- (C) Team captain
- (S) Suspended
- (I) Ineligible
- (W) Walk-on
- Injured
- Current redshirt

Roster
Last update: 20 August 2013

== Schedule ==
Date time, TV	Rank^{#}	Opponent^{#}	Result	Record	Site (attendance) city, state
Regular season
8 November*; 7:00 pm, FSN	No. 17	Southern	W 63–56	1–0	BMO Harris Bradley Center (14,269); Milwaukee, WI
12 November*; 6:00 pm, FS1	No. 17	Grambling State	W 114–71	2–0	BMO Harris Bradley Center (13,372); Milwaukee, WI
16 November*; 12:00 pm, FOX	No. 17	No. 10 Ohio State	L 35–52	2–1	BMO Harris Bradley Center (18,756); Milwaukee, WI
21 November*; 7:00 pm, CBSSN	No. 25	New Hampshire	W 58–53	3–1	BMO Harris Bradley Center (13,522); Milwaukee, WI
25 November*; 8:00 pm, FS1	No. 25	at Arizona State	L 77–79	3–2	Wells Fargo Arena (9,155); Tempe, AZ
28 November*; 3:30 pm, ESPN2	No. 25	at Cal State Fullerton; The Wooden Legacy Quarterfinals	W 86–66	4–2	Titan Gym (1,966); Fullerton, CA
29 November*; 2:30 pm, ESPN	No. 25	vs. George Washington; The Wooden Legacy Semifinals	W 76–60	5–2	Titan Gym (N/A); Fullerton, CA
1 December*; 8:30 pm, ESPN2	No. 25	vs. San Diego State; The Wooden Legacy championship	L 59–67	5–3	Honda Center (6,007); Anaheim, CA
7 December*; 1:15 pm, BTN		at No. 8 Wisconsin; Rivalry	L 64–70	5–4	Kohl Center (17,249); Madison, WI
14 December*; 2:00 pm, FS1		IUPUI	W 86–50	6–4	BMO Harris Bradley Center (13,972); Milwaukee, WI
17 December*; 8:00 pm, FS1		Ball State	W 91–53	7–4	BMO Harris Bradley Center (13,668); Milwaukee, WI
21 December*; 8:00 pm, ESPNU		vs. New Mexico; MGM Grand Showcase	L 68–75	7–5	MGM Grand Garden Arena (N/A); Las Vegas, NV
28 December*; 1:00 pm, FSN		Samford	W 71–48	8–5	BMO Harris Bradley Center (14,668); Milwaukee, WI
Big East regular season
31 December; 9:00 pm, FS1		at Creighton	L 49–67	8–6 (0–1)	CenturyLink Center (18,525); Omaha, NE
4 January; 1:00 pm, CBSSN		DePaul	W 66–56	9–6 (1–1)	BMO Harris Bradley Center (15,194); Milwaukee, WI
9 January; 8:00 pm, FS1		at Xavier	L 79–86	9–7 (1–2)	Cintas Center (9,630); Cincinnati, OH
11 January; 1:00 pm, FSN		Seton Hall	W 67–66	10–7 (2–2)	BMO Harris Bradley Center (15,581); Milwaukee, WI
18 January; 1:00 pm, CBSSN		at Butler	L 57–69 ^{OT}	10–8 (2–3)	Hinkle Fieldhouse (10,000); Indianapolis, IN
20 January; 9:00 pm, FS1		at Georgetown	W 80–72 ^{OT}	11–8 (3–3)	Verizon Center (9,014); Washington, D.C.
25 January; 1:00 pm, FS1		No. 4 Villanova	L 85–94 ^{OT}	11–9 (3–4)	BMO Harris Bradley Center (16,662); Milwaukee, WI
30 January; 11:00 am, FS1		Providence	W 61–50	12–9 (4–4)	BMO Harris Bradley Center (15,248); Milwaukee, WI
1 February; 11:30 am, FS1		at St. John's	L 59–74	12–10 (4–5)	Madison Square Garden (12,561); New York City, NY
4 February; 8:00 pm, FS1		Butler	W 69–62	13–10 (5–5)	BMO Harris Bradley Center (14,479); Milwaukee, WI
11 February; 6:00 pm, FS1		at Seton Hall	W 77–66	14–10 (6–5)	Prudential Center (6,342); Newark, NJ
15 February; 6:00 pm, FOX		Xavier	W 81–72	15–10 (7–5)	BMO Harris Bradley Center (18,644); Milwaukee, WI
19 February; 7:00 pm, FS1		No. 11 Creighton	L 70–85	15–11 (7–6)	BMO Harris Bradley Center (15,539); Milwaukee, WI
22 February; 1:00 pm, CBSSN		at DePaul	W 96–94 ^{OT}	16–11 (8–6)	Allstate Arena (9,342); Rosemont, IL
27 February; 8:00 pm, FS1		Georgetown	W 75–73	17–11 (9–6)	BMO Harris Bradley Center (14,874); Milwaukee, WI
2 March; 1:00 pm, CBS		at No. 8 Villanova	L 56–73	17–12 (9–7)	Wells Fargo Center (15,026); Philadelphia, PA
4 March; 8:00 pm, FS1		at Providence	L 80–81 ^{2OT}	17–13 (9–8)	Dunkin' Donuts Center (11,461); Providence, RI
8 March; 11:00 am, FS1		St. John's	L 90–91 ^{2OT}	17–14 (9–9)	BMO Harris Bradley Center (16,784); Milwaukee, WI
Big East tournament
13 March; 9:30 pm, FS1		vs. Xavier; Quarterfinals	L 65–68	17–15	Madison Square Garden (13,807); New York City, NY
*Non-conference game. ^{#}Rankings from AP Poll. (#) Tournament seedings in parentheses. All times are in Central Time.

== Rankings ==
Ranking movement Legend: ██ Improvement in ranking. ██ Decrease in ranking. ██NR = Not ranked. RV = Receiving votes.
Poll	Pre- Season	Week 2	Week 3	Week 4	Week 5	Week 6	Week 7	Week 8	Week 9	Week 10	Week 11	Week 12	Week 13	Week 14	Week 15	Week 16	Week 17	Week 18	Week 19	Week 20	Final
AP	17	17	25	25	NR	NR	NR	NR	NR	NR	NR	NR	NR	NR	NR	NR	NR	NR	NR	NR	N/A
Coaches	17	17	RV	RV	RV	NR	NR	NR	NR	NR	NR	NR	NR	NR	NR	NR	NR	NR	NR	NR	NR
