= 2013–14 Creighton Bluejays men's basketball team =

American college basketball season

2013–14 Creighton Bluejays men's basketball

NCAA tournament, round of 32
- Conference: Big East Conference

Ranking
- Coaches: No. 20
- AP: No. 16
- Record: 27–8 (14–4 Big East)
- Head coach: Greg McDermott (4th year)
- Assistant coaches: Darian DeVries (16th year); Steve Lutz (4th year); Steve Merfeld (4th year); Patrick Sellers (1st year)
- Home arena: CenturyLink Center Omaha

2013–14 Big East men's basketball standings
	Conf.				Overall
Team	W		L	PCT	W		L	PCT
No. 6 Villanova	16	–	2	.889	29	–	5	.853
No. 16 Creighton	14	–	4	.778	27	–	8	.771
Providence †	10	–	8	.556	23	–	12	.657
Xavier	10	–	8	.556	21	–	13	.618
St. John's	10	–	8	.556	20	–	13	.606
Marquette	9	–	9	.500	17	–	15	.531
Georgetown	8	–	10	.444	18	–	15	.545
Seton Hall	6	–	12	.333	17	–	17	.500
Butler	4	–	14	.222	14	–	17	.452
DePaul	3	–	15	.167	12	–	21	.364
† 2014 Big East tournament winner Rankings from AP poll Source:

The 2013–14 Creighton Bluejays men's basketball team represented Creighton University during the 2013–14 NCAA Division I men's basketball season. The Bluejays, led by fourth-year head coach Greg McDermott, played their home games at the CenturyLink Center Omaha, and were in their first season as members of the Big East Conference. They finished the season 27–8, 14–4 in Big East play to finish in second place. They advanced to the championship game of the Big East tournament where they lost to Providence. They received an at-large bid to the NCAA tournament where they defeated Louisiana–Lafayette in the first round before losing in the second round to Baylor.

== Roster ==
2013–14 Creighton Bluejays men's basketball team
Players
Coaches

Pos.	#	Name	Height	Weight	Year	Previous school	Hometown
G	1	Austin Chatman	6 ft 0 in (1.83 m)	185 lb (84 kg)	Jr	The Colony	The Colony, TX
G	2	Steve Ferrarini (W)	6 ft 1 in (1.85 m)	180 lb (82 kg)	So	Westside; Central CC	Omaha, NE
F	3	Doug McDermott (C, W)	6 ft 8 in (2.03 m)	225 lb (102 kg)	Sr	Ames	Ames, IA
F	4	Alex Olsen (W)	6 ft 6 in (1.98 m)	190 lb (86 kg)	RS So	Abraham Lincoln	Council Bluffs, IA
G	5	Devin Brooks	6 ft 2 in (1.88 m)	160 lb (73 kg)	Jr	St. Raymond; Iowa Western CC	Harlem, NY
G	10	Grant Gibbs (C)	6 ft 5 in (1.96 m)	210 lb (95 kg)	RS Sr	Linn-Mar; Gonzaga	Marion. IA
G	11	Tyler Clement (W)	6 ft 1 in (1.85 m)	173 lb (78 kg)	Fr	St. Thomas Aquinas	Overland Park, KS
G	12	Jahenns Manigat	6 ft 1 in (1.85 m)	175 lb (79 kg)	Sr	Elite Academy	Ottawa, ON, Canada
G	15	Darian Harris (redshirt)	6 ft 6 in (1.98 m)	185 lb (84 kg)	Fr	Shiloh Christian	Springdale, AR
G	20	John Burns (W)	6 ft 4 in (1.93 m)	180 lb (82 kg)	Fr	Bishop Garrigan	Algona, IA
G	21	Isaiah Zierden (injured)	6 ft 2 in (1.88 m)	175 lb (79 kg)	RS Fr	Benilde-St. Margaret's	St. Louis Park, MN
G	22	Avery Dingman	6 ft 6 in (1.98 m)	205 lb (93 kg)	Jr	Branson	Branson, MO
G	23	James Milliken (redshirt)	6 ft 2 in (1.88 m)	180 lb (82 kg)	Jr	Jordan–Matthews; Cowley County CC	Siler City, NC
G	25	Eric Roberts (W)	6 ft 4 in (1.93 m)	215 lb (98 kg)	Fr	Eagle River	Eagle River, AK
C	31	Will Artino	6 ft 11 in (2.11 m)	230 lb (104 kg)	Jr	Waukee	Waukee, Iowa
F	32	Toby Hegner (redshirt)	6 ft 10 in (2.08 m)	205 lb (93 kg)	Fr	Berlin	Berlin, WI
F	34	Ethan Wragge	6 ft 7 in (2.01 m)	225 lb (102 kg)	RS Sr	Eden Prairie	Eden Prairie, MN
F	40	Zach Hanson	6 ft 9 in (2.06 m)	245 lb (111 kg)	Fr	T. F. Riggs	Pierre, SD
C	41	Geoffrey Groselle	7 ft 0 in (2.13 m)	250 lb (113 kg)	So	Plano West	Plano, TX
F	50	Mogboluwaga Oginni (W)	6 ft 8 in (2.03 m)	220 lb (100 kg)	So	Saint Louis University HS	St. Louis, MO

Head coach

- Greg McDermott (Northern Iowa)

Assistant coach(es)

- Darian DeVries (Northern Iowa)
- Steve Lutz (Texas Lutheran)
- Steve Merfeld (UW–La Crosse)
- Patrick Sellers (Central Connecticut State)

Legend

- (C) Team captain
- (S) Suspended
- (I) Ineligible
- (W) Walk-on
- Injured
- Current redshirt

Roster
Last update: 2012-10-11

=== Depth chart ===
Pos.	Starting 5	Bench 1	Bench 2
C	Ethan Wragge	Will Artino	Geoffrey Groselle
PF	Doug McDermott	Zach Hanson	Mogboluwaga Oginni
SF	Grant Gibbs	Avery Dingman	Alex Olsen
SG	Jahenns Manigat	Isaiah Zierden	Steven Ferrarini
PG	Austin Chatman	Devin Brooks

== Rankings ==
Ranking movement Legend: ██ Improvement in ranking. ██ Decrease in ranking. RV=Received votes.
Poll	Pre	Wk 2	Wk 3	Wk 4	Wk 5	Wk 6	Wk 7	Wk 8	Wk 9	Wk 10	Wk 11	Wk 12	Wk 13	Wk 14	Wk 15	Wk 16	Wk 17	Wk 18	Wk 19	Wk 20	Final
AP	RV	RV	23	20	RV	RV	NR	RV	RV	RV	20	RV	20	12	18	11т	9	13	14	16	N/A
Coaches	RV	RV	23	18	RV	RV	RV	RV	RV	23	19	24	20	12	17	12	10	13	14	16	20

== Schedule and results ==
Date time, TV	Rank^{#}	Opponent^{#}	Result	Record	High points	High rebounds	High assists	Site (attendance) city, state
Exhibition
Nov 1*; 7:00 pm		Northern State	W 89–61	–	26 – McDermott	8 – Artino	7 – Brooks	CenturyLink Center (16,299); Omaha, NE
Regular season
Nov 8*; 7:00 pm, FSN		Alcorn State	W 107–61	1–0	20 – McDermott	6 – Tied	5 – 3 Tied	CenturyLink Center (17,740); Omaha, NE
Nov 11*; 8:00 pm, FS1		UMKC	W 96–70	2–0	37 – McDermott	9 – Brooks	9 – Chatman	CenturyLink Center (16,859); Omaha, NE
Nov 16*; 6:00 pm, CSNPA/SNY		at Saint Joseph's	W 83–79	3–0	21 – Wragge	6 – Gibbs	6 – Gibbs	Hagan Arena (4,200); Philadelphia, PA
Nov 23*; 2:30 pm, FSN	No. 23	Tulsa	W 82–72	4–0	33 – McDermott	15 – McDermott	9 – Chatman	CenturyLink Center (18,078); Omaha, NE
Nov 28*; 10:00 pm, ESPN2	No. 20	vs. Arizona State; Wooden Legacy Quarterfinals	W 88–60	5–0	27 – McDermott	6 – McDermott	5 – Manigat	Titan Gym (1,865); Fullerton, CA
Nov 29*; 8:30 pm, ESPN2	No. 20	vs. San Diego State; The Wooden Legacy semifinals	L 80–86	5–1	30 – McDermott	6 – Gibbs	7 – Gibbs	Titan Gym (3,287); Fullerton, CA
Dec 1*; 5:30 pm, ESPNU	No. 20	vs. George Washington; Wooden Legacy 3rd place game	L 53–60	5–2	16 – Wragge	9 – Wragge	4 – Chatman	Honda Center (6,007); Anaheim, CA
Dec 3*; 9:00 pm		at Long Beach State	W 78–61	6–2	21 – McDermott	7 – Brooks	4 – Chatman	Walter Pyramid (3,481); Long Beach, CA
Dec 8*; 5:00 pm, FS1		Nebraska; Rivalry	W 82–67	7–2	21 – McDermott	9 – Wragge	8 – Gibbs	CenturyLink Center (17,530); Omaha, NE
Dec 17*; 7:00 pm, FS2		Arkansas–Pine Bluff	W 88–51	8–2	25 – McDermott	9 – McDermott	5 – Brooks	CenturyLink Center (16,303); Omaha, NE
Dec 22*; 6:00 pm, FS1		California	W 68–54	9–2	20 – McDermott	11 – McDermott	3 – 3 Tied	CenturyLink Center (17,533); Omaha, NE
Dec 29*; 4:00 pm, FS1		Chicago State	W 90–58	10–2	24 – McDermott	6 – McDermott	5 – Chatman	CenturyLink Center (17,466); Omaha, NE
Dec 31; 9:00 pm, FS1		Marquette	W 67–49	11–2 (1–0)	19 – McDermott	7 – McDermott	6 – Manigat	CenturyLink Center (18,525); Omaha, NE
Jan 4; 2:00 pm, FS1		at Seton Hall	W 79–66	12–2 (2–0)	30 – McDermott	10 – McDermott	5 – Tied	Prudential Center (7,060); Newark, NJ
Jan 7; 8:00 pm, FS1		at DePaul	W 81–62	13–2 (3–0)	19 – McDermott	7 – Tied	6 – Chatman	Allstate Arena (7,104); Rosemont, IL
Jan 12; 2:00 pm, CBSSN		Xavier	W 95–89	14–2 (4–0)	35 – McDermott	8 – Artino	6 – Manigat	CenturyLink Center (17,589); Omaha, NE
Jan 14; 8:00 pm, FS1	No. 20	Butler	W 88–60	15–2 (5–0)	28 – McDermott	7 – Dingman	6 – Manigat	CenturyLink Center (17,602); Omaha, NE
Jan 18; 1:00 pm, FS1	No. 20	at Providence	L 68–81	15–3 (5–1)	21 – McDermott	7 – McDermott	3 – Brooks	Dunkin' Donuts Center (11,026); Providence, RI
Jan 20; 6:00 pm, FS1		at No. 4 Villanova	W 96–68	16–3 (6–1)	27 – Wragge	5 – Tied	10 – Chatman	Wells Fargo Center (14,114); Philadelphia, PA
Jan 25; 7:00 pm, FS1		Georgetown	W 76–63	17–3 (7–1)	14 – Tied	10 – McDermott	7 – Chatman	CenturyLink Center (18,859); Omaha, NE
Jan 28; 8:00 pm, FS1	No. 20	St. John's	W 63–60	18–3 (8–1)	39 – McDermott	9 – Dingman	5 – Manigat	CenturyLink Center (17,515); Omaha, NE
Feb 7; 8:00 pm, FS1	No. 12	DePaul	W 78–66	19–3 (9–1)	23 – McDermott	9 – McDermott	8 – Gibbs	CenturyLink Center (18,323); Omaha, NE
Feb 9; 6:00 pm, FS1	No. 12	at St. John's	L 65–70	19–4 (9–2)	25 – McDermott	11 – Gibbs	6 – Gibbs	Madison Square Garden (6,739); New York City, NY
Feb 13; 6:00 pm, CBSSN	No. 18	at Butler	W 68–63	20–4 (10–2)	26 – McDermott	10 – Artino	6 – Chatman	Hinkle Fieldhouse (7,805); Indianapolis, IN
Feb 16; 4:00 pm, FS1	No. 18	No. 6 Villanova	W 101–80	21–4 (11–2)	39 – McDermott	7 – McDermott	8 – Chatman	CenturyLink Center (18,797); Omaha, NE
Feb 19; 7:00 pm, FS1	No. 11	at Marquette	W 85–70	22–4 (12–2)	25 – McDermott	8 – McDermott	5 – Manigat	BMO Harris Bradley Center (15,539); Milwaukee, WI
Feb 23; 4:00 pm, FSN	No. 11	Seton Hall	W 72–71	23–4 (13–2)	29 – McDermott	4 – Tied	5 – Chatman	CenturyLink Center (18,742); Omaha, NE
Mar 1; 4:00 pm, FS1	No. 9	at Xavier	L 69–75	23–5 (13–3)	27 – McDermott	7 – McDermott	4 – Tied	Cintas Center (10,483); Cincinnati, OH
Mar 4; 6:00 pm, FS1	No. 13	at Georgetown	L 63–75	23–6 (13–4)	22 – McDermott	12 – McDermott	5 – Brooks	Verizon Center (12,105); Washington, DC
Mar 8; 6:30 pm, CBSSN	No. 13	Providence	W 88–73	24–6 (14–4)	45 – McDermott	7 – Tied	6 – Brooks	CenturyLink Center (18,868); Omaha, NE
Big East tournament
Mar 13; 7:00 pm, FS1	No. 14	vs. DePaul; Quarterfinals	W 84–62	25–6	35 – McDermott	8 – Wragge	9 – Chatman	Madison Square Garden (13,807); New York City, NY
Mar 14; 9:30 pm, FS1	No. 14	vs. Xavier; Semifinals	W 86–78	26–6	32 – McDermott	5 – Gibbs	5 – Brooks	Madison Square Garden (15,580); New York City, NY
Mar 15; 7:30 pm, FS1	No. 14	vs. Providence; Championship	L 58–65	26–7	27 – McDermott	5 – McDermott	8 – Chatman	Madison Square Garden (15,290); New York City, NY
NCAA tournament
Mar 21*; 2:10 pm, truTV	No. 16 (3 W)	vs. (14 W) Louisiana–Lafayette; Second round	W 76–66	27–7	30 – McDermott	12 – McDermott	6 – Tied	AT&T Center (12,663); San Antonio, TX
Mar 23*; 6:45 pm, truTV	No. 16 (3 W)	vs. No. 23 (6 W) Baylor; Third round	L 55–85	27–8	15 – McDermott	4 – Brooks	4 – Brooks	AT&T Center (13,431); San Antonio, TX
*Non-conference game. ^{#}Rankings from AP Poll, (#) denotes seed within region W=West. (#) Tournament seedings in parentheses. All times are in Central Time.
