= 2013–14 Arkansas–Pine Bluff Golden Lions men's basketball team =

American college basketball season

2013–14 Arkansas–Pine Bluff Golden Lions men's basketball
- Conference: Southwestern Athletic Conference
- Record: 13–18 (11–7 SWAC)
- Head coach: George Ivory (6th season)
- Assistant coaches: Kenneth Broyles; Ed McCarter; Jarvis Gunter
- Home arena: K. L. Johnson Complex

2013–14 SWAC men's basketball standings
	Conf.				Overall
Team	W		L	PCT	W		L	PCT
Southern*	15	–	3	.833	19	–	13	.594
Texas Southern †	12	–	6	.667	19	–	15	.559
Alabama State	12	–	6	.667	19	–	13	.594
Arkansas–Pine Bluff*	11	–	7	.611	13	–	18	.419
Alabama A&M	10	–	8	.556	14	–	16	.467
Alcorn State**	9	–	9	.500	12	–	19	.387
Jackson State	7	–	11	.389	11	–	20	.355
Prairie View A&M	6	–	12	.333	11	–	23	.324
Mississippi Valley State*	5	–	13	.278	9	–	23	.281
Grambling State*	3	–	15	.167	5	–	24	.172
† 2014 SWAC tournament winner Rankings from AP poll *ineligible for postseason play due to APR penalties **Handed a L1 APR penalty, but eligible for postseason

The 2013–14 Arkansas–Pine Bluff Golden Lions men's basketball team represented the University of Arkansas at Pine Bluff during the 2013–14 NCAA Division I men's basketball season. The Golden Lions, led by sixth year head coach George Ivory, played their home games at the K. L. Johnson Complex and were members of the Southwestern Athletic Conference. They finished the season 13–18, 11–7 in SWAC play to finish in fourth place. They lost in the quarterfinals of the SWAC tournament to Alabama A&M.

== Roster ==
Number	Name	Position	Height	Weight	Year	Hometown
00	Sean Tingle	Forward	6–9	230	Junior	Vance, Alabama
1	Marcel Mosley	Guard	6–0	180	Junior	Marion, Arkansas
3	DaVon Haynes	Forward	6–8	215	Junior	Detroit, Michigan
10	Trent Jeffries	Guard	6–2	175	Freshman	Gulfport, Mississippi
12	Jaylon Floyd	Guard	6–6	205	Junior	Detroit, Michigan
14	Tevin Hammond	Guard	6–0	185	Junior	Little Rock, Arkansas
15	Trent Whiting	Forward	6–7	205	Sophomore	Des Arc, Arkansas
21	Chandler Savage	Guard	6–3	185	Junior	Pine Bluff, Arkansas
22	DeAndre McIntyre	Guard	6–3	190	Junior	Birmingham, Alabama
23	Ghiavonni Robinson	Guard	6–3	190	Freshman	Itta Bena, Mississippi
30	Jordan Brown	Guard	6–4	190	Freshman	Augusta, Arkansas
40	Jared Young	Guard	5–11	175	Junior	Memphis, Tennessee
44	Daniel Broughton	Forward	6–8	225	Senior	Pine Bluff, Arkansas
52	David Tillman	Center	6–10	215	Freshman	Houston, Texas

== Schedule ==
Date time, TV	Opponent	Result	Record	Site (attendance) city, state
Regular season
11/10/2013*; 2:00 pm	vs. Tuskegee; Morehouse/HBCU Challenge	W 66–64	1–0	Forbes Arena (102); Atlanta, GA
11/11/2013*; 6:00 pm	at Morehouse College; Morehouse/HBCU Challenge	W 67–54	2–0	Forbes Arena (310); Atlanta, GA
11/15/2013*; 7:00 pm	at No. 8 Oklahoma State	L 63–97	2–1	Gallagher-Iba Arena (8,321); Stillwater, OK
11/17/2013*; 3:00 pm	at Air Force	L 64–67	2–2	Clune Arena (1,593); Colorado Springs, CO
11/24/2013*; 1:30 pm, ESPN3	at SMU; Corpus Christi Challenge	L 61–87	2–3	Garland Special Events Center (3,308); Garland, TX
11/26/2013*; 7:00 pm, FSSW	at Texas A&M; Corpus Christi Challenge	L 55–88	2–4	Reed Arena (4,351); College Station, TX
11/29/2013*; 3:30 pm	vs. Sam Houston State; Corpus Christi Challenge	L 49–75	2–5	American Bank Center (N/A); Corpus Christi, TX
11/30/2013*; 12:30 pm	vs. Hampton; Corpus Christi Challenge	L 65–72	2–6	American Bank Center (N/A); Corpus Christi, TX
12/13/2013*; 7:00 pm, P12N	at Oregon State	L 63–77	2–7	Gill Coliseum (2,369); Corvallis, OR
12/17/2013*; 7:00 pm, FS2	at Creighton	L 51–88	2–8	CenturyLink Center (16,303); Omaha, NE
12/22/2013*; 7:00 pm, ESPN3	at No. 25 Iowa	L 61–86	2–9	Carver–Hawkeye Arena (15,400); Iowa City, IA
12/30/2013*; 7:00 pm, CSS	at Auburn	L 59–91	2–10	Auburn Arena (4,467); Auburn, AL
01/04/2014; 5:00 pm	at Mississippi Valley State	W 78–73	3–10 (1–0)	Leflore County Civic Center (902); Greenwood, MS
01/11/2014; 6:00 pm	at Alabama A&M	W 72–64	4–10 (2–0)	Elmore Gymnasium (2,057); Huntsville, AL
01/13/2014; 6:00 pm	at Alabama State	L 64–77	4–11 (2–1)	Dunn–Oliver Acadome (N/A); Montgomery, AL
01/18/2014; 7:30 pm	Southern	L 56–60	4–12 (2–2)	K. L. Johnson Complex (4,976); Pine Bluff, AR
01/20/2014; 7:30 pm	Alcorn State	L 45–71	4–13 (2–3)	K. L. Johnson Complex (4,435); Pine Bluff, AR
01/25/2014; 5:00 pm	at Prairie View A&M	L 62–71	4–14 (2–4)	William Nicks Building (1,275); Prairie View, TX
01/27/2014; 8:00 pm, ESPNU	at Texas Southern	L 71–72	4–15 (2–5)	H&PE Arena (2,148); Houston, TX
02/01/2014; 7:30 pm	Grambling State	W 66–64	5–15 (3–5)	K. L. Johnson Complex (4,287); Pine Bluff, AR
02/03/2014; 7:30 pm	Jackson State	W 70–69	6–15 (4–5)	K. L. Johnson Complex (3,890); Pine Bluff, AR
02/08/2014; 7:30 pm	Alabama A&M	W 64–61	7–15 (5–5)	K. L. Johnson Complex (3,088); Pine Bluff, AR
02/10/2014; 7:30 pm	Alabama State	W 76–71	8–15 (6–5)	K. L. Johnson Complex (2,116); Pine Bluff, AR
02/15/2014; 5:00 pm	at Southern	W 64–58	9–15 (7–5)	F. G. Clark Center (986); Baton Rouge, LA
02/17/2014; 7:30 pm	at Alcorn State	L 54–57	9–16 (7–6)	Davey Whitney Complex (N/A); Lorman, MS
02/22/2014; 7:30 pm	Prairie View A&M	W 76–61	10–16 (8–6)	K. L. Johnson Complex (4,126); Pine Bluff, AR
02/24/2014; 7:30 pm	Texas Southern	L 55–65	10–17 (8–7)	K. L. Johnson Complex (3,235); Pine Bluff, AR
03/01/2014; 5:00 pm	at Grambling State	W 61–52	11–17 (9–7)	Fredrick C. Hobdy Assembly Center (300); Grambling, LA
03/03/2014; 5:30 pm	at Jackson State	W 66–59	12–17 (10–7)	Williams Assembly Center (642); Jackson, MS
03/08/2014; 7:30 pm	Mississippi Valley State	W 83–68	13–17 (11–7)	K. L. Johnson Complex (4,337); Pine Bluff, AR
SWAC tournament
03/13/15; 8:00 pm	vs. Alabama A&M; Quarterfinals	L 50–69	13–18	Toyota Center (N/A); Houston, TX
*Non-conference game. ^{#}Rankings from AP Poll. (#) Tournament seedings in parentheses. All times are in Central Time.
