= Chico Potts =

American basketball coach

Biographical details
- Born: February 28, 1976 (age 50); Indianola, Mississippi, U.S.

Playing career
- 1995–1997: Lon Morris
- 1997–1998: LSU
- 1999–2000: Delta State
- Position: Forward

Coaching career (HC unless noted)
- 2001–2002: Delta State (grad. asst.)
- 2002–2003: Greenville Weston HS (asst.)
- 2003–2006: Tupelo HS (asst.)
- 2006–2008: Delta State (asst.)
- 2008–2012: Mississippi Valley State (asst.)
- 2012–2014: Mississippi Valley State
- 2014–2022: Gentry HS
- 2022–present: Horn Lake HS

Head coaching record
- Overall: 14–46 (.233) (college)

Alfrico V. "Chico" Potts (born February 28, 1976) is an American basketball coach who is currently head boys' basketball coach at Horn Lake HS. From 2012 to 2014, he was men's basketball head coach for Mississippi Valley State University. He played college basketball at Lon Morris College, LSU, and Delta State and has been a high school and college basketball coach since 2001.

== Early life and education ==
Alfrico V. Potts grew up in Indianola, Mississippi, graduating from Gentry High School in 1995. Although he initially signed with Liberty University out of high school, Potts began his college basketball career at Lon Morris College, a junior college in Jacksonville, Texas. At Lon Morris, Potts averaged 11.1 points and 7.4 rebounds.

In 1997, Potts transferred to Louisiana State University. A 6-foot-6, 225-pound forward on the LSU Tigers in 1997–98, Potts played in 26 games with one start, averaging 2.9 points and 2.2 rebounds under head coach John Brady. After redshirting in 1998–99, Potts transferred to Delta State University, playing his final season of college basketball there in 1999–2000 and graduating from Delta State with a bachelor's degree in physical education.

== Coaching career ==
=== Early coaching career (2001–2008) ===
While pursuing his master's degree at Delta State, Potts was a graduate assistant for Delta State in 2001–02 and completed his degree in 2002. Potts then was junior varsity boys' head coach and assistant varsity boys' head coach at Greenville Weston High School in 2002–03, then had the same jobs at Tupelo High School from 2003 to 2006. From 2006 to 2008, Potts was assistant coach at Delta State.

=== Mississippi Valley State assistant and head coach (2008–2014) ===
Potts then coached for six years at Mississippi Valley State, starting as an assistant coach from 2008 to 2012 under head coach Sean Woods. In the 2011–12 season, Mississippi Valley State had a 17-game win streak that was second longest in NCAA Division I, won the Southwestern Athletic Conference regular season and tournament championships, and qualified for the NCAA Tournament.

After Woods resigned to become head coach at Morehead State, Mississippi Valley State promoted Potts to head coach on June 18, 2012.

On July 12, 2013, Mississippi Valley State suspended Potts after he was arrested for domestic violence. Prosecutors dropped the charges five days later, and Mississippi Valley State reinstated Potts on July 23.

Potts had a 14–46 record in two seasons as Mississippi Valley State head coach. Following the 2013–14 season, Mississippi Valley State reassigned Potts to a different job in the athletics department in March 2014 before firing him.

=== High school coach (2014–present) ===
In 2014, Potts returned to Gentry High School as varsity boys' basketball head coach. In eight seasons, Potts had winning records every season, including a 30–4 season in 2017–18.

Beginning in 2022, Potts became head coach at Horn Lake High School.

== Head coaching record ==
Record table
Season	Team	Overall	Conference	Standing	Postseason
Mississippi Valley State Delta Devils (Southwestern Athletic Conference) (2012–2014)
2012–13	Mississippi Valley State	5–23	5–13	9th	
2013–14	Mississippi Valley State	9–23	5–13	9th	
Mississippi Valley State:		14–46 (.233)	10–26 (.278)		
Total:		14–46 (.233)			
National champion Postseason invitational champion Conference regular season champion Conference regular season and conference tournament champion Division regular season champion Division regular season and conference tournament champion Conference tournament champion
