= 2013–14 Alabama A&M Bulldogs basketball team =

American college basketball season

2013–14 Alabama A&M Bulldogs men's basketball
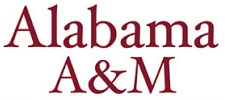
- Conference: Southwestern Athletic Conference
- Record: 14–16 (10–8 SWAC)
- Head coach: Willie Hayes (3rd season)
- Assistant coaches: Dexter Holt; James Wright
- Home arena: Elmore Gymnasium

2013–14 SWAC men's basketball standings
	Conf.				Overall
Team	W		L	PCT	W		L	PCT
Southern*	15	–	3	.833	19	–	13	.594
Texas Southern †	12	–	6	.667	19	–	15	.559
Alabama State	12	–	6	.667	19	–	13	.594
Arkansas–Pine Bluff*	11	–	7	.611	13	–	18	.419
Alabama A&M	10	–	8	.556	14	–	16	.467
Alcorn State**	9	–	9	.500	12	–	19	.387
Jackson State	7	–	11	.389	11	–	20	.355
Prairie View A&M	6	–	12	.333	11	–	23	.324
Mississippi Valley State*	5	–	13	.278	9	–	23	.281
Grambling State*	3	–	15	.167	5	–	24	.172
† 2014 SWAC tournament winner Rankings from AP poll *ineligible for postseason play due to APR penalties **Handed a L1 APR penalty, but eligible for postseason

The 2013–14 Alabama A&M Bulldogs basketball team represented Alabama Agricultural and Mechanical University during the 2013–14 NCAA Division I men's basketball season. The Bulldogs, led by third year head coach Willie Hayes, played their home games at Elmore Gymnasium and were members of the Southwestern Athletic Conference. They finished the season 14–16, 10–8 in SWAC play to finish in fifth place. They advanced to the semifinals of the SWAC tournament where they lost to Prairie View A&M.

== Roster ==
Number	Name	Position	Height	Weight	Year	Hometown
00	Justan Banks	Center	7–1	215	Junior	Oxford, Alabama
4	Justin Colvin	Guard	6–3	190	Sophomore	Lithonia, Georgia
10	Jeremy Crutcher	Guard	5–8	160	Senior	Hazel Green, Alabama
11	Arthur Capers	Forward	6–5	185	Senior	Monroe, Georgia
12	Green Hill	Guard	5–10	175	Senior	Aransas Pass, Texas
20	Jose Long	Guard/Forward	6–5	210	Junior	Madison, Alabama
22	Tyler Davis	Guard	6–2	180	Sophomore	Madison, Alabama
24	Matthew Cotton	Guard	5–10	185	Freshman	Atlanta
30	Demarquelle Tabb	Guard/Forward	6–5	210	Senior	Greensboro, Alabama
33	Baryn Houston	Guard/Forward	6–7	190	Sopohomore	Birmingham, Alabama
35	Nicholas West	Forward	6–10	190	Sophomore	LaGrange, Georgia
40	Brandon Ellis	Guard	6–3	200	Senior	Loxley, Alabama
41	Rakiya Battle	Guard	5–10	180	Freshman	Harvest, Alabama
42	Isaiah Edwards	Guard	6–2	200	Freshman	New Market, Alabama
45	Xavier Williams	Forward	6–8	205	Freshman	Birmingham, Alabama
55	Jerome Hunter	Forward/Center	6–8	230	Senior	Buffalo, New York

== Schedule ==
Date time, TV	Opponent	Result	Record	Site (attendance) city, state
Regular season
11/09/2013*; 9:00 pm, no	at No. 23 New Mexico	L 52–88	0–1	The Pit (14,445); Albuquerque, New Mexico
11/14/2013*; 7:00 pm, no	vs. Alabama–Huntsville	W 79–73	1–1	Von Braun Center (2,546); Huntsville, Alabama
11/17/2013*; 2:00 pm, no	at Western Michigan	L 69–73	1–2	University Arena (2,132); Kalamazoo, Michigan
11/19/2013*; 7:00 pm, no	at Eastern Kentucky	L 68–82	1–3	McBrayer Arena (2,300); Richmond, Kentucky
11/25/2013*; 7:00 pm, no	Jacksonville State	L 69–76	1–4	Elmore Gymnasium (1,127); Huntsville, Alabama
12/03/2013*; 7:00 pm, no	at Tennessee State	W 66–65	2–4	Gentry Complex (1,296); Nashville, Tennessee
12/05/2013*; 7:00 pm, no	Oakwood	W 70–58	3–4	Elmore Gymnasium (2,932); Huntsville, Alabama
12/14/2013*; 1:00 pm, no	at Ohio	L 47–72	3–5	Convocation Center (5,336); Athens, Ohio
12/21/2013*; 7:00 pm, no	at Missouri State	L 47–68	3–6	JQH Arena (4,176); Springfield, Ohio
12/29/2013*; 2:00 pm, no	at UAB	L 57–69	3–7	Bartow Arena (3,411); Birmingham, Alabama
01/04/2014; 6:00 pm, no	at Jackson State	W 68–61	4–7 (1–0)	Williams Assembly Center (877); Jackson, Mississippi
01/06/2014; 7:30 pm, no	at Grambling State	W 70–58	5–7 (2–0)	Fredrick C. Hobdy Assembly Center (1,735); Grambling, Louisiana
01/11/2014; 6:00 pm, no	Arkansas–Pine Bluff	L 64–72	5–8 (2–1)	Elmore Gymnasium (2,057); Huntsville, Alabama
01/13/2014; 7:30 pm, no	Mississippi Valley State	W 68–59	6–8 (3–1)	Elmore Gymnasium (1,461); Huntsville, Alabama
01/18/2014; 6:00 pm, no	at Alabama State	L 58–67 ^{OT}	6–9 (3–2)	Dunn–Oliver Acadome (7,589); Montgomery, Alabama
01/25/2014; 6:00 pm, no	at Southern	L 52–66	6–10 (3–3)	F.G. Clark Center (1,165); Baton Rouge, Louisiana
01/27/2014; 7:30 pm, no	at Alcorn State	L 64–70 ^{OT}	6–11 (3–4)	Davey Whitney Complex (N/A); Lorman, Mississippi
02/01/2014; 6:00 pm, no	Texas Southern	W 63–62	7–11 (4–4)	Elmore Gymnasium (1,613); Huntsville, Alabama
02/03/2014; 8:00 pm, no	Prairie View A&M	W 67–55	8–11 (5–4)	Elmore Gymnasium (1,483); Huntsville, Alabama
02/08/2014; 6:00 pm, no	at Arkansas–Pine Bluff	L 61–64	8–12 (5–5)	K. L. Johnson Complex (3,088); Pine Bluff, Arkansas
02/10/2014; 7:30 pm, no	at Mississippi Valley State	W 91–82	9–12 (6–5)	Leflore County Civic Center (1,098); Greenwood, Mississippi
02/15/2014; 6:00 pm, no	Alabama State	W 68–65 ^{OT}	10–12 (7–5)	Elmore Gymnasium (3,510); Huntsville, Alabama
02/22/2014; 6:00 pm, no	Southern	L 62–70	10–13 (7–6)	Elmore Gymnasium (1,261); Huntsville, Alabama
02/24/2014; 7:30 pm, no	Alcorn State	L 56–64	10–14 (7–7)	Elmore Gymnasium (1,067); Huntsville, Alabama
03/01/2014; 6:00 pm, no	at Prairie View A&M	W 72–65	11–14 (8–7)	William Nicks Building (1,245); Prairie View, Texas
03/03/2014; 7:30 pm, no	at Texas Southern	L 58–79	11–15 (8–8)	Health and Physical Education Arena (1,425); Houston
03/06/2014; 7:30 pm, no	Jackson State	W 72–59	12–15 (9–8)	Elmore Gymnasium (1,408); Huntsville, Alabama
03/08/2014; 6:00 pm, no	Grambling State	W 80–63	13–15 (10–8)	Elmore Gymnasium (1,169); Huntsville, Alabama
SWAC tournament
03/13/2014; 8:00 pm, no	vs. Arkansas–Pine Bluff; Quarterfinals	W 69–50	14–15	Toyota Center (N/A); Houston
03/14/2014; 8:30 pm, no	vs. Prairie View A&M; Semifinals	L 49–55	14–16	Toyota Center (N/A); Houston
*Non-conference game. ^{#}Rankings from AP Poll. (#) Tournament seedings in parentheses. All times are in Central Time.
