= 2013–14 Alcorn State Braves basketball team =

American college basketball season

2013–14 Alcorn State Braves men's basketball
- Conference: Southwestern Athletic Conference
- Record: 12–19 (9–9 SWAC)
- Head coach: Luther Riley
- Assistant coaches: Christopher Giles; James Horton; Shawn Pepp
- Home arena: Davey Whitney Complex

2013–14 SWAC men's basketball standings
	Conf.				Overall
Team	W		L	PCT	W		L	PCT
Southern*	15	–	3	.833	19	–	13	.594
Texas Southern †	12	–	6	.667	19	–	15	.559
Alabama State	12	–	6	.667	19	–	13	.594
Arkansas–Pine Bluff*	11	–	7	.611	13	–	18	.419
Alabama A&M	10	–	8	.556	14	–	16	.467
Alcorn State**	9	–	9	.500	12	–	19	.387
Jackson State	7	–	11	.389	11	–	20	.355
Prairie View A&M	6	–	12	.333	11	–	23	.324
Mississippi Valley State*	5	–	13	.278	9	–	23	.281
Grambling State*	3	–	15	.167	5	–	24	.172
† 2014 SWAC tournament winner Rankings from AP poll *ineligible for postseason play due to APR penalties **Handed a L1 APR penalty, but eligible for postseason

The 2013–14 Alcorn State Braves basketball team represented Alcorn State University during the 2013–14 NCAA Division I men's basketball season. The Braves, led by head coach Luther Riley, played their home games at the Davey Whitney Complex and were members of the Southwestern Athletic Conference. They finished the season 12–19, 9–9 in SWAC play to finish in sixth place. They lost in the quarterfinals of the SWAC tournament to Alabama State.

== Roster ==
Number	Name	Position	Height	Weight	Year	Hometown
0	Tyrel Hunt	Forward	6–5	205	Sophomore	Queens, New York
1	Shaunessy Smith	Guard	6–6	210	Senior	Macon, Mississippi
2	Twan Oakley	Guard	6–4	185	Senior	Memphis, Tennessee
3	Denarius Odell	Guard	6–1	170	Freshman	Jackson, Mississippi
5	Anthony Evans	Guard	6–1	170	Senior	Greenville, Mississippi
10	Devante Hampton	Guard	6–1	170	Sophomore	Memphis, Tennessee
11	Martrevious Sanders	Guard	5–10	165	Senior	Tunica, Mississippi
12	Terrance Birdie	Guard	6–2	189	Sophomore	Little Elm, Texas
15	LeAntwan Luckett	Forward	6–4	184	Sophomore	Ridgeland, Mississippi
21	Stephan Raquil	Forward	6–10	225	Senior	France
23	Marius Myles	Forward	6–5	185	Senior	Jackson, Mississippi
24	George Thomas	Forward	6–6	210	Sophomore	Clinton, Mississippi
25	DeCarlos Holmes	Forward	6–8	215	Freshman	Memphis, Tennessee
30	Marquis Vance	Forward	6–7	225	Freshman	Lexington, Mississippi
32	Rahkeem Lehaman	Guard	6–5	180	Freshman	Greenwood, Mississippi
35	Octavius Brown	Forward	6–8	210	Junior	Brandon, Mississippi
40	Josh Nicholas	Forward	7–0	225	Senior	Fort Myers, Florida
45	Corey Young	Forward	6–6	250	Junior	Jackson, Mississippi

== Schedule ==
Date time, TV	Opponent	Result	Record	Site (attendance) city, state
Regular season
11/08/2013*; 7:00 pm, no	at Creighton	L 61–107	0–1	CenturyLink Center Omaha (17,740); Omaha, NE
11/10/2013*; 4:00 pm, no	Tougaloo	W 73–68	1–1	Davey Whitney Complex (255); Lorman, MS
11/12/2013*; 7:00 pm, no	Mississippi College	W 87–61	2–1	Davey Whitney Complex (293); Lorman, MS
11/18/2013*; 6:00 pm, no	Dillard	W 91–51	3–1	Davey Whitney Complex (179); Lorman, MS
11/24/2013*; 7:30 pm, no	at Saint Mary's	L 55–72	3–2	McKeon Pavilion (2,349); Moraga, CA
11/27/2013*; 7:00 pm, no	at Wright State	L 55–73	3–3	Nutter Center (3,211); Fairborn, OH
12/02/2013*; 7:00 pm, no	at Troy	L 70–73 ^{2OT}	3–4	Trojan Arena (985); Troy, AL
12/09/2013*; 7:00 pm, no	at Houston	L 58–89	3–5	Hofheinz Pavilion (2,833); Houston, TX
12/11/2013*; 7:00 pm, no	at Jacksonville State	L 52–63	3–6	Pete Mathews Coliseum (503); Jacksonville, AL
12/16/2013*; 7:00 pm, no	at Mercer	L 44–70	3–7	Hawkins Arena (1,723); Macon, GA
12/28/2013*; 5:00 pm, no	vs. Denver; Sun Bowl Classic	L 49–67	3–8	Don Haskins Center (6,132); El Paso, TX
12/29/2013*; 5:00 pm, no	vs. Western Illinois; Sun Bowl Classic	L 62–64	3–9	Don Haskins Center (6,244); El Paso, TX
01/04/2014; 5:30 pm, no	at Texas Southern	L 66–83	3–10 (0–1)	Health and Physical Education Arena (1,042); Houston, TX
01/06/2014; 5:30 pm, no	at Prairie View A&M	L 67–70 ^{OT}	3–11 (0–2)	William Nicks Building (409); Prairie View, TX
01/11/2014; 5:00 pm, no	Jackson State	W 64–51	4–11 (1–2)	Davey Whitney Complex (2,509); Lorman, MS
01/13/2014; 7:30 pm, no	Grambling State	W 64–56	5–11 (2–2)	Davey Whitney Complex (1,139); Lorman, MS
01/18/2014; 4:30 pm, no	at Mississippi Valley State	W 65–53	6–11 (3–2)	Leflore County Civic Center (1,093); Greenwood, MS
01/20/2014; 7:30 pm, no	at Arkansas–Pine Bluff	W 71–45	7–11 (4–2)	K. L. Johnson Complex (4,435); Pine Bluff, AR
01/25/2014; 5:00 pm, no	Alabama State	L 54–58	7–12 (4–3)	Davey Whitney Complex (N/A); Lorman, MS
01/27/2014; 7:30 pm, no	Alabama A&M	W 70–64 ^{OT}	8–12 (5–3)	Davey Whitney Complex (N/A); Lorman, MS
02/01/2014; 4:40 pm, no	at Southern	L 54–62	8–13 (5–4)	F. G. Clark Center (1,670); Baton Rouge, LA
02/08/2014; 4:30 pm, no	at Jackson State	L 61–71	8–14 (5–5)	Williams Assembly Center (2,240); Jackson, MS
2/10/2014; 7:30 pm, no	at Grambling State	L 80–95	8–15 (5–6)	Fredrick C. Hobdy Assembly Center (2,723); Grambling, LA
02/15/2014; 5:00 pm, no	Mississippi Valley State	W 67–63	9–15 (6–6)	Davey Whitney Complex (1,452); Lorman, MS
02/17/2014; 7:30 pm, no	Arkansas–Pine Bluff	W 57–54	10–15 (7–6)	Davey Whitney Complex (N/A); Lorman, MS
02/22/2014; 4:30 pm, no	at Alabama State	L 86–92	10–16 (7–7)	Dunn–Oliver Acadome (1,274); Montgomery, AL
02/24/2014; 7:30 pm, no	at Alabama A&M	W 64–56	11–16 (8–7)	Elmore Gymnasium (1,067); Huntsville, AL
03/01/2014; 5:00 pm, no	Southern	L 54–67	11–17 (8–8)	Davey Whitney Complex (1,093); Lorman, MS
03/06/2014; 7:30 pm, no	Texas Southern	L 69–77	11–18 (8–9)	Davey Whitney Complex (727); Lorman, MS
03/08/2014; 5:00 pm, no	Prairie View A&M	W 64–62	12–18 (9–9)	Davey Whitney Complex (N/A); Lorman, MS
SWAC tournament
03/13/2014; 12:30 pm, no	vs. Alabama State; Quarterfinals	L 51–64	12–19	Toyota Center; Houston, TX
*Non-conference game. ^{#}Rankings from AP Poll. (#) Tournament seedings in parentheses. All times are in Central Time.
