= Mike Davis (basketball, born 1960) =

American basketball player and coach (born 1960)

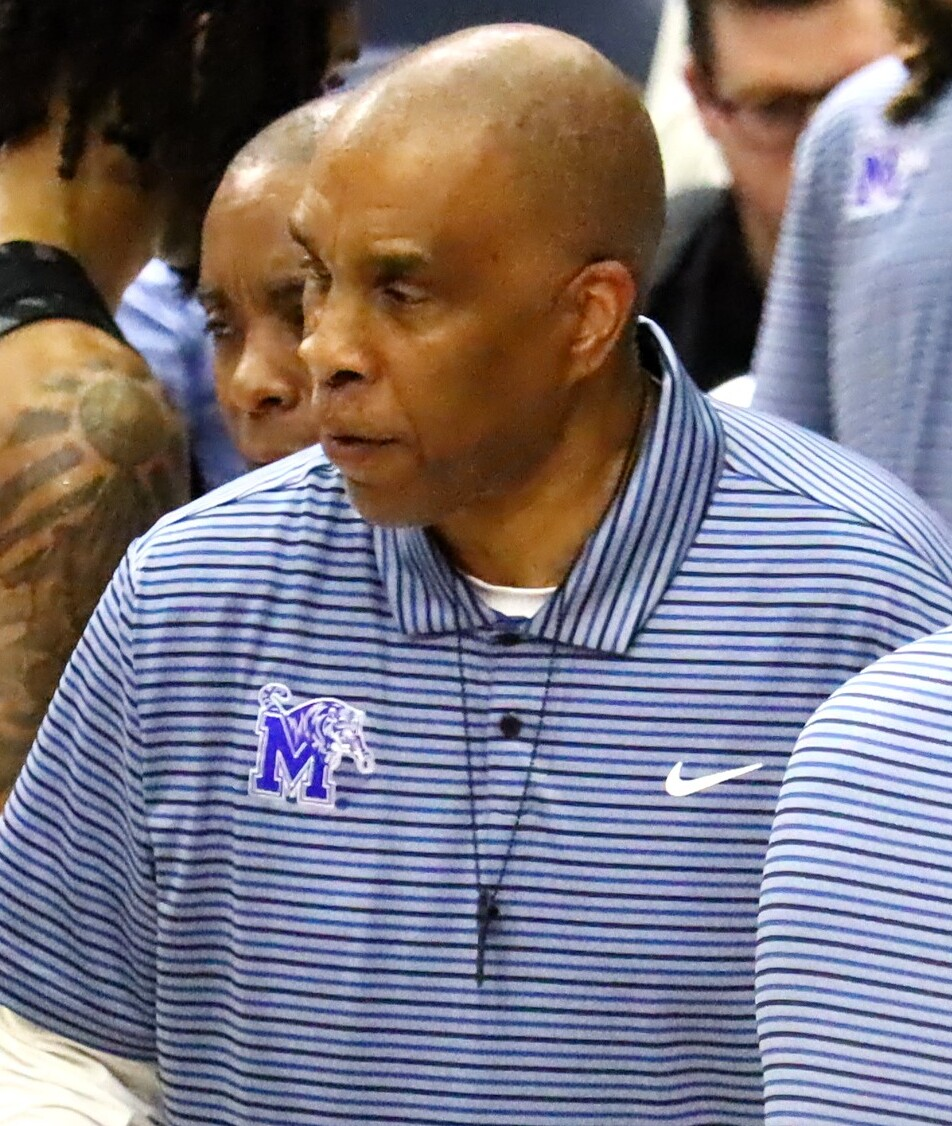
- Davis in 2025

Mississippi Valley State Delta Devils
- Title: Head coach
- League: SWAC

Personal information
- Born: September 15, 1960 (age 66) Fayette, Alabama, U.S.
- Listed height: 6 ft 5 in (1.96 m)
- Listed weight: 195 lb (88 kg)

Career information
- College: Alabama (1979–1983)
- NBA draft: 1983: 2nd round, 42nd overall pick
- Drafted by: Milwaukee Bucks
- Playing career: 1983–1995
- Position: Guard
- Coaching career: 1990–present

Career history

Playing
- 1988–1989: Topeka Sizzlers
- 1990–1992: Wichita Falls Texans
- 1993–1995: Chicago Rockers

Coaching
- 1990–1995: Wichita Falls Texans / Chicago Rockers (assistant)
- 1995–1997: Alabama (assistant)
- 1997–2000: Indiana (assistant)
- 2000–2006: Indiana
- 2006–2012: UAB
- 2012–2018: Texas Southern
- 2018–2024: Detroit Mercy
- 2024–2025: Memphis (assistant)
- 2026–present: Mississippi Valley State

Career highlights
- As player: Alabama Mr. Basketball (1979); As head coach: 4× SWAC tournament champion (2014, 2015, 2017, 2018); 4× SWAC regular season champion (2013, 2015–2017); 3× SWAC Coach of the Year (2013, 2015, 2016); C-USA Coach of the Year (2011); C-USA regular season champion (2011); NCAA Division I Regional—Final Four (2002); Big Ten regular season champion (2002)
- Stats at Basketball Reference

Michael Davis (born September 15, 1960) is an American college basketball coach who is the current head men's basketball coach at Mississippi Valley State University. Previously, he was the head men's basketball coach at the University of Detroit Mercy, a position he held from 2018 to 2024. Davis also served as the head men's basketball coach at Indiana University Bloomington from 2000 to 2006, the University of Alabama at Birmingham (UAB) from 2006 to 2012, and Texas Southern University from 2012 to 2018.

== Playing career ==
Davis, an Alabama native, spent his collegiate playing career with the University of Alabama Crimson Tide after earning the state's Mr. Basketball honor in 1979. Following his playing career at Alabama, Davis was a second-round selection of the Milwaukee Bucks of the National Basketball Association in the 1983 draft, but never played in the league. He would spend the next two seasons playing in Switzerland, where he and teammate Ron Burns were named to the league's all-star team, and in Italy. He played the 1988–89 season with the Topeka Sizzlers of the Continental Basketball Association (CBA).

== Coaching career ==
Davis began his coaching career as an assistant at Miles College in Fairfield, Alabama. After one season at Miles College, Davis relocated to Venezuela, directing both professional teams and the country's national team.

In 1990, Davis returned to the United States and took a position with the Wichita Falls Texans of the Continental Basketball Association (CBA). He made brief appearances as a player from 1990 to 1992, totalling 63 minutes in 5 games. Davis played in 18 games during the 1993–94 season and averaged 5.0 points per game. In 1994, the Wichita Falls franchise relocated to Chicago, Illinois, and became the Chicago Rockers. Davis played in 56 games for the Rockers during the 1994–95 season and averaged 8.3 points per game.

=== Alabama ===
Davis returned to his alma mater Alabama and served as an assistant coach from 1995 to 1997 under head coach David Hobbs.

=== Indiana ===
==== Assistant coach ====
In 1997, Davis joined the coaching staff of legendary coach Bob Knight at Indiana University. In his three seasons as an IU assistant, the Hoosiers compiled a 63–32 overall record and advanced to the NCAA Tournament three times.

==== Head coach ====
Indiana University president Myles Brand dismissed Bob Knight in September 2000, finding him in violation of a "zero tolerance" policy Brand had previously instituted. Students and alumni protested the Knight firing, and several players threatened to transfer unless assistants John Treloar and Mike Davis were promoted to replace Knight. Brand offered the assistants jobs as 'co coaches' but Treloar declined, deferring to Davis. As such, Davis was named as interim coach on September 12, 2000. Treloar accepted the title of 'Associate Head Coach.'

In his first season, Davis led a team featuring NBA draft picks Kirk Haston and Jared Jeffries to a 21–13 record. On March 21, 2001, Davis was formally named as Indiana's 22nd full-time head coach and the Hoosiers' first African–American head coach. In 2002, the Davis-led Hoosiers followed a 19–11 regular season with a surprise run to the NCAA Division I men's basketball tournament title game. One month later, Indiana rewarded Davis with a contract extension through the 2007–08 season.

Coach Davis was unable to maintain similar success in the following years. In a game on December 21, 2002, Indiana took on 16th ranked Kentucky. During the game at 2.6 seconds, Davis was subsequently ejected. Kentucky went on to win the game 70–64.

The following season, in 2003–04, Indiana's 14–15 record was the school's first losing season in over 35 years. In 2004 'Associate Head Coach' John Treloar left Indiana for a position as an assistant coach at LSU. The following season, Indiana went 15–14, including a first round home loss in the NIT. In the spring of 2005, Athletic Director Rick Greenspan warned,

While we share this common goal and are both confident that it will be reached, we also know that our record the last two years is not up to the standards to which Indiana is accustomed and to which we aspire. This is why we have set ambitious and achievable goals for next season of competing at a very high level in the Big Ten Conference and successfully competing in the NCAA tournament.

Indiana again failed to meet expectations during the 2005–06 season. By late January 2006, the Hoosiers were at risk of missing the tournament for the third straight year and the calls for Davis' job grew louder. On February 11, 2006, Davis missed a home game against Iowa. Four days later, he resigned effective at the end of the 2006 season. Davis said that he decided to make the announcement before the end of the season to end the distraction that his position's uncertainty had created around the team. The Hoosiers performed better after this announcement and reached the second round of the NCAA Tournament. Indiana lost 90–80 to Gonzaga in the NCAA Tournament on March 18, 2006, ending Mike Davis' tenure as Indiana's head coach.

In 2018 Davis admitted that he was not ready to be a head coach at such a large school when he took over for Knight. Speaking on the Big Ten Network's 'A Taste of Coaching,' Davis said, "I wasn't prepared, I knew I wasn't prepared, but I tried to walk out like I was prepared." Davis also said in 2018 that he was now '100 times better' as a coach than he was at Indiana due to his increased coaching experience.

=== UAB ===
On April 7, 2006, Davis was hired as the new head coach of the UAB Blazers. Davis replaced Mike Anderson, who left UAB after a successful stint to become the head coach at Missouri. The Blazers finished 15–16 in Davis' first season at the helm, earning a 9th seed in the Conference USA tournament and losing to 8th seed Marshall 53–52 in the first round. UAB subsequently failed to qualify for the NCAA men's basketball tournament, ending the Blazers' three-year streak of appearances in the NCAA post-season and causing some to question whether Davis was the right man for the job.

Despite several injuries and academic casualties in Davis's second year at UAB, Davis led the Blazers to a 22–9 regular season record and a 2nd-place finish in Conference USA. The Blazers narrowly missed making the NCAA men's basketball tournament and instead were rewarded with an appearance in the NIT.

On April 24, 2007, the University Board of Trustees rewarded Davis with a 2-year contract extension. The extended contract ran through and the 2012–13 season featured a base salary that was increased to $625,000 from $600,000 annually. He was also eligible for increased incentives, including $35,000 for taking UAB to the NCAA Tournament, $75,000 each for a Sweet 16 appearance and a Final Four appearance and $100,000 for appearing in the national championship game. The buyout clause in the contract was increased from $500,000 to $625,000. This contract is fully guaranteed. On March 16, 2012, after a 15–16 record (9–7 in Conference USA) Davis was fired as the head basketball coach at UAB due to "poor ticket sales and attendance" as well as waning fan support and a history of disappointing performances in postseason action.

=== Texas Southern ===
On August 2, 2012, Davis was named interim head coach of Texas Southern University after the abrupt resignation of Tony Harvey. On October 26, 2012, Davis signed a four-year contract to become the full-time coach at Texas Southern. He was named 2014–2015 SWAC coach of the year.

In six seasons, Davis made the NCAA Tournament four times. He left for Detroit Mercy after the end of the 2017–18 season.

=== Detroit Mercy ===
On June 13, 2018, Davis was named head coach of Detroit Mercy. On March 7, 2024, Davis and the team parted ways following a 1–31 season.

== Head coaching record ==
Record table
Season	Team	Overall	Conference	Standing	Postseason
Indiana Hoosiers (Big Ten Conference) (2000–2006)
2000–01	Indiana	21–13	10–6	4th	NCAA Division I Round of 64
2001–02	Indiana	25–12	11–5	T–1st	NCAA Division I Runner-up
2002–03	Indiana	21–13	8–8	6th	NCAA Division I Round of 32
2003–04	Indiana	14–15	7–9	T–9th	
2004–05	Indiana	15–14	10–6	T–4th	NIT first round
2005–06	Indiana	19–12	9–7	T–4th	NCAA Division I Round of 32
Indiana:		115–79 (.593)	55–41 (.573)		
UAB Blazers (Conference USA) (2006–2012)
2006–07	UAB	15–16	7–9	T–8th	
2007–08	UAB	23–11	12–4	2nd	NIT Second round
2008–09	UAB	22–12	11–5	3rd	NIT First round
2009–10	UAB	25–9	11–5	T–3rd	NIT quarterfinal
2010–11	UAB	22–9	12–4	1st	NCAA Division I First Four
2011–12	UAB	15–16	9–7	T–5th	
UAB:		122–73 (.626)	62–34 (.646)		
Texas Southern Tigers (Southwestern Athletic Conference) (2012–2018)
2012–13	Texas Southern	17–14	16–2	1st	
2013–14	Texas Southern	19–15	12–6	T–2nd	NCAA Division I First Four
2014–15	Texas Southern	22–13	16–2	1st	NCAA Division I Round of 64
2015–16	Texas Southern	18–15	16–2	1st	NIT first round
2016–17	Texas Southern	23–12	16–2	1st	NCAA Division I Round of 64
2017–18	Texas Southern	16–20	12–6	T–2nd	NCAA Division I Round of 64
Texas Southern:		115–89 (.564)	88–20 (.815)		
Detroit Mercy Titans (Horizon League) (2018–2024)
2018–19	Detroit Mercy	11–20	8–10	T–6th	
2019–20	Detroit Mercy	8–23	6–12	9th	
2020–21	Detroit Mercy	12–10	10–6	3rd	
2021–22	Detroit Mercy	14–16	10–7	6th	TBC first round
2022–23	Detroit Mercy	14–19	9–11	T–8th	
2023–24	Detroit Mercy	1–31	1–19	11th	
Detroit:		60–119 (.335)	44–65 (.404)		
Mississippi Valley State Delta Devils (SWAC) (2026–present)
2026–27	Mississippi Valley State	0–0	0–0		
Mississippi Valley State:		0–0 (–)	0–0 (–)		
Total:		412–360 (.534)			
National champion Postseason invitational champion Conference regular season champion Conference regular season and conference tournament champion Division regular season champion Division regular season and conference tournament champion Conference tournament champion

== Personal ==
Davis is married to Tamilya Davis (née Floyd). The couple has a son, Antoine, who played for his father at Detroit Mercy. Davis is also the father of Mike Davis Jr., who was a member of the UAB men's basketball team, and a daughter, Lateesha. His cousin is Ronnie McCollum, the 2001 NCAA Division I men's basketball scoring champion and expatriate professional basketball player.

Davis is also a devout Christian.

== See also ==
- List of NCAA Division I Men's Final Four appearances by coach
