= 2013–14 Air Force Falcons men's basketball team =

American college basketball season

2013–14 Air Force Falcons men's basketball
- Conference: Mountain West Conference
- Record: 12–18 (6–12 Mountain West)
- Head coach: Dave Pilipovich (2nd season)
- Assistant coaches: Silvey Dominguez; Drew Long; Tyson Wright
- Home arena: Clune Arena

2013–14 Mountain West Conference men's basketball standings
	Conf.				Overall
Team	W		L	PCT	W		L	PCT
No. 13 San Diego State	16	–	2	.889	31	–	5	.861
No. 17 New Mexico †	15	–	3	.833	27	–	7	.794
UNLV	10	–	8	.556	20	–	13	.606
Nevada	10	–	8	.556	15	–	17	.469
Boise State	9	–	9	.500	21	–	13	.618
Wyoming	9	–	9	.500	18	–	15	.545
Fresno State	9	–	9	.500	21	–	18	.538
Utah State	7	–	11	.389	18	–	14	.563
Colorado State	7	–	11	.389	16	–	16	.500
Air Force	6	–	12	.333	12	–	18	.400
San Jose State	1	–	17	.056	7	–	24	.226
† 2014 MWC tournament winner Rankings from AP poll

The 2013–14 Air Force Falcons men's basketball team represented the United States Air Force Academy during the 2013–14 NCAA Division I men's basketball season. The Falcons, led by second-year head coach Dave Pilipovich, played their home games at Clune Arena on the Air Force Academy's main campus in Colorado Springs, Colorado. They finished the season 12–18, with a 6–12 record in Mountain West play, and finished in tenth place. They lost in the first round of the Mountain West Conference tournament to Fresno State.

== Departures ==
Name	Number	Pos.	Height	Weight	Year	Hometown	Notes
Mike Fitzgerald	5	G	6'6"	215	Senior	Centerville, MN	Graduated
Todd Fletcher	10	G	6'2"	183	Senior	Lee's Summit, MO	Graduated
Michael Lyons	14	G	6'5"	193	Senior	Newport News, VA	Graduated
Cam Michael	15	G	6'5"	185	Freshman	Loveland, CO	Transferred
Marshall Leipprandt	23	F	6'6"	205	Freshman	Ubly, MI	Transferred
Alex LaLonde	24	G	6'5"	175	Freshman	Wooster, OH	Transferred
Kyle Green	25	G	6'2"	182	Senior	Richland Hills, TX	Graduated
Conner Litt	33	F/C	6'10"	215	Freshman	Lancaster, OH	Left team
Taylor Broekhuis	34	C	6'10"	220	Senior	Colorado Springs, CO	Graduated
Phillip Mays	45	G	6'1"	190	Freshman	Memphis, TN	Left team

== Recruiting ==
College recruiting
Name	Hometown	School	Height	Weight	Commit date
Ryan Manning; PF	Sacramento, CA	Air Force Academy Prep School	6 ft 5 in (1.96 m)	190 lb (86 kg)	May 2, 2013
Ryan Manning; PF	Recruit ratings: Scout: Rivals: (POST)				
Dylan Clark; PG	Colorado Springs, CO	Sand Creek	6 ft 1 in (1.85 m)	175 lb (79 kg)	Jun 27, 2013
Dylan Clark; PG	Recruit ratings: Scout: Rivals: (N/A)				
Overall recruit ranking: Scout: – Rivals: –
Note: In many cases, Scout, Rivals, 247Sports, On3, and ESPN may conflict in their listings of height and weight.; In these cases, the average was taken. ESPN grades are on a 100-point scale.; Sources: "Air Force Commit List for 2013". Rivals.; "Men's Basketball Recruiting". Scout.; "ESPN – Air Force Falcons Basketball Recruiting 2013". ESPN.; "Scout.com Team Recruiting Rankings". Scout.; "2013 Team Ranking". Rivals.

== Roster ==
2013–14 Air Force Falcons men's basketball team
Players
Coaches

Pos.	#	Name	Height	Weight	Year	Previous school	Hometown
F	0	Marek Olesinski	6 ft 8 in (2.03 m)	216 lb (98 kg)	Jr	USAFA Prep School	Roswell, NM
G	1	Tre Coggins	6 ft 2 in (1.88 m)	185 lb (84 kg)	So	USAFA Prep School	San Juan Capistrano, CA
G	3	Justin Hammonds	6 ft 6 in (1.98 m)	193 lb (88 kg)	Jr	Richland	Houston, TX
F	4	Kamryn Williams	6 ft 4 in (1.93 m)	193 lb (88 kg)	Jr	USAFA Prep School	Colorado Springs, CO
G	5	Zach Kocur	6 ft 3 in (1.91 m)	195 lb (88 kg)	Fr	USAFA Prep School	Denver, CO
F	10	Nick Jorgensen	6 ft 6 in (1.98 m)	208 lb (94 kg)	Fr	USAFA Prep School	Minnetonka, MN
F	11	Joe Tuss	6 ft 8 in (2.03 m)	200 lb (91 kg)	Fr	USAFA Prep School	Las Vegas, NV
G	12	Scott Adler	6 ft 4 in (1.93 m)	190 lb (86 kg)	Jr	USAFA Prep School	Las Cruces, NM
F	21	DeLovell Earls	6 ft 5 in (1.96 m)	220 lb (100 kg)	Jr	USAFA Prep School	Colorado Springs, CO
G	22	Max Yon	6 ft 4 in (1.93 m)	195 lb (88 kg)	Jr	Ronald Reagan HS	San Antonio, TX
F	25	Kyle Broekhuis	6 ft 7 in (2.01 m)	195 lb (88 kg)	Fr	USAFA Prep School	Colorado Springs, CO
G	30	Callum Long	6 ft 5 in (1.96 m)	190 lb (86 kg)	Fr	USAFA Prep School	Flagstaff, AZ
F	33	Austin Flues	6 ft 8 in (2.03 m)	205 lb (93 kg)	Fr	Century HS	Aloha, OR
F	35	Hayden Graham	6 ft 5 in (1.96 m)	190 lb (86 kg)	Fr	USAFA Prep School	Austin, TX
F	40	Eric Lewis	6 ft 7 in (2.01 m)	225 lb (102 kg)	Fr	USAFA Prep School	Scottsdale, AZ
C	41	Zach Moer	6 ft 11 in (2.11 m)	218 lb (99 kg)	So	USAFA Prep School	Dallas, TX
F	42	Ethan Michael	6 ft 8 in (2.03 m)	232 lb (105 kg)	Jr	USAFA Prep School	Toledo, OH
F	44	Chase Kammerer	6 ft 7 in (2.01 m)	245 lb (111 kg)	Sr	St. Thomas HS	Montgomery, TX
C	45	Darrius Parker	6 ft 7 in (2.01 m)	215 lb (98 kg)	Fr	USAFA Prep School	Allen, TX

Head coach

- Dave Pilipovich (Thiel)

Assistant coach(es)

- Silvey Dominguez (New Mexico)
- Drew Long (Northwestern)
- Tyron Wright (Air Force)

Legend

- (C) Team captain
- (S) Suspended
- (I) Ineligible
- (W) Walk-on
- Injured
- Current redshirt

Roster
Last update: 2013-09-22

== Schedule and results ==
Date time, TV	Rank^{#}	Opponent^{#}	Result	Record	Site (attendance) city, state
Exhibition
11/03/2013*; 2:00 pm		Regis	L 65–70		Clune Arena (N/A); Colorado Springs, CO
Regular season
11/08/2013*; 11:00 am, ESPNU		vs. Army; All-Military Classic semifinals	W 79–68	1–0	Cameron Hall (1,652); Lexington, VA
11/09/2013*; 6:30 pm, ESPN3		at VMI; All-Military Classic Championship	L 63–71	1–1	Cameron Hall (4,195); Lexington, VA
11/14/2013*; 7:00 pm		Jackson State	L 82–84	1–2	Clune Arena (1,588); Colorado Springs, CO
11/17/2013*; 2:00 pm		Arkansas–Pine Bluff	W 67–64	2–2	Clune Arena (1,593); Colorado Springs, CO
11/20/2013*; 7:00 pm		Colorado Christian	W 78–51	3–2	Clune Arena (1,607); Colorado Springs, CO
11/27/2013*; 7:00 pm		Richmond	L 60–83	3–3	Clune Arena (2,091); Colorado Springs, CO
11/30/2013*; 2:00 pm		Colorado	L 57–81	3–4	Clune Arena (5,394); Colorado Springs, CO
12/05/2013*; 7:05 pm, RTRM		South Dakota	W 94–86	4–4	Clune Arena (1,599); Colorado Springs, CO
12/09/2013*; 7:00 pm		Western State	W 94–53	5–4	Clune Arena (1,601); Colorado Springs, CO
12/14/2013*; 2:00 pm		UC Riverside	W 62–52	6–4	Clune Arena (1,702); Colorado Springs, CO
12/21/2013*; 3:30 pm		at UC Davis	L 74–80	6–5	The Pavilion (802); Davis, CA
01/01/2014; 6:00 pm, RTRM		Utah State	W 73–72	7–5 (1–0)	Clune Arena (2,223); Colorado Springs, CO
01/04/2014; 8:00 pm, Cox 96		at UNLV	W 75–68	8–5 (2–0)	Thomas & Mack Center (12,325); Paradise, NV
01/08/2014; 8:05 pm, RTRM		at Fresno State	L 65–71	8–6 (2–1)	Save Mart Center (5,947); Fresno, CA
01/12/2014; 2:00 pm, ESPN3		No. 13 San Diego State	L 72–79	8–7 (2–2)	Clune Arena (2,152); Colorado Springs, CO
01/15/2014; 7:00 pm		San Jose State	W 77–62	9–7 (3–2)	Clune Arena (1,695); Colorado Springs, CO
01/18/2014; 4:05 pm, RTRM		at Colorado State	L 68–74	9–8 (3–3)	Moby Arena (4,296); Fort Collins, CO
01/22/2014; 7:05 pm, RTRM		Wyoming	L 59–66	9–9 (3–4)	Clune Arena (1,881); Colorado Springs, CO
01/29/2014; 7:05 pm, RTRM		at Boise State	L 58–69	9–10 (3–5)	Taco Bell Arena (5,006); Boise, ID
02/01/2014; 4:05 pm		at Nevada	L 56–69 ^{OT}	9–11 (3–6)	Lawlor Events Center (6,376); Reno, NV
02/05/2014; 7:00 pm		Fresno State	L 51–68	9–12 (3–7)	Clune Arena (1,601); Colorado Springs, CO
02/08/2014; 2:00 pm		Colorado State	L 56–68	9–13 (3–8)	Clune Arena (3,781); Colorado Springs, CO
02/12/2014; 8:00 pm, RTRM		at San Jose State	W 51–48	10–13 (4–8)	Event Center Arena (1,326); San Jose, CA
02/15/2014; 6:05 pm, CBSSN		at No. 5 San Diego State	L 56–64	10–14 (4–9)	Viejas Arena (12,414); San Diego, CA
02/22/2014; 2:00 pm		Nevada	L 56–75	10–15 (4–10)	Clune Arena (2,485); Colorado Springs, CO
02/26/2014; 7:05 pm, RTRM		at Wyoming	W 55–53	11–15 (5–10)	Arena-Auditorium (4,468); Laramie, WY
03/01/2014; 2:00 pm, ESPN3		UNLV	L 67–93	11–16 (5–11)	Clune Arena (2,362); Colorado Springs, CO
03/05/2014; 7:00 pm, ESPN3		at No. 21 New Mexico	L 52–80	11–17 (5–12)	The Pit (15,411); Albuquerque, NM
03/08/2014; 12:00 pm, RTRM		Boise State	W 64–61 ^{OT}	12–17 (6–12)	Clune Arena (2,689); Colorado Springs, CO
Mountain West tournament
03/12/2014; 5:30 pm	(10)	vs. (7) Fresno State; First round	L 59–61	12–18	Thomas & Mack Center (5,824); Paradise, NV
*Non-conference game. ^{#}Rankings from AP Poll. (#) Tournament seedings in parentheses. All times are in Mountain Time.

== See also ==
- 2013–14 Air Force Falcons women's basketball team
