= 2013–14 Mississippi Valley State Delta Devils basketball team =

American college basketball season

2013–14 Mississippi Valley State Delta Devils men's basketball
- Conference: Southwestern Athletic Conference
- Record: 9–23 (5–13 SWAC)
- Head coach: Chico Potts (2nd season)
- Assistant coaches: Marcus Thomas; Richard Cannon
- Home arena: Harrison HPER Complex; Leflore County Civic Center; The Pinnacle

2013–14 SWAC men's basketball standings
	Conf.				Overall
Team	W		L	PCT	W		L	PCT
Southern*	15	–	3	.833	19	–	13	.594
Texas Southern †	12	–	6	.667	19	–	15	.559
Alabama State	12	–	6	.667	19	–	13	.594
Arkansas–Pine Bluff*	11	–	7	.611	13	–	18	.419
Alabama A&M	10	–	8	.556	14	–	16	.467
Alcorn State**	9	–	9	.500	12	–	19	.387
Jackson State	7	–	11	.389	11	–	20	.355
Prairie View A&M	6	–	12	.333	11	–	23	.324
Mississippi Valley State*	5	–	13	.278	9	–	23	.281
Grambling State*	3	–	15	.167	5	–	24	.172
† 2014 SWAC tournament winner Rankings from AP poll *ineligible for postseason play due to APR penalties **Handed a L1 APR penalty, but eligible for postseason

The 2013–14 Mississippi Valley State Delta Devils basketball team represented Mississippi Valley State University during the 2013–14 NCAA Division I men's basketball season. The Delta Devils, led by second year head coach Chico Potts, were members of the Southwestern Athletic Conference. Other than one exhibition game, due to renovations at their normal home arena, the Harrison HPER Complex, they played their home games at the Leflore County Civic Center in Greenwood, Mississippi and one home game at The Pinnacle on the campus of Coahoma Community College. They finished the season 9–23, 5–13 in SWAC play to finish in ninth place. They were ineligible for postseason play due to APR penalties. However, the SWAC received a waiver to allow its teams under APR penalties to still participate in the SWAC tournament where the Delta Devils lost in the first round to Prairie View A&M.

== Roster ==
Number	Name	Position	Height	Weight	Year	Hometown
0	Davarius Mike	Forward	6–4	210	Freshman	Memphis, Tennessee
1	Lequarius Mike	Guard	6–3	182	Junior	Tchula, Mississippi
2	Jordan Washington	Guard	5–10	174	Freshman	Memphis, Tennessee
3	Darryl Marshall	Guard	5–11	167	Senior	Memphis, Tennessee
5	Jeffrey Simmons	Guard	6–1	178	Junior	Greenwood, Mississippi
11	Cameron Dobbs	Guard	6–0	173	Sophomore	Albany, New York
12	Cordarius Samples	Guard	6–3	206	Sophomore	Birmingham, Alabama
13	Cortland Henry	Guard	6–2	194	Senior	Selma, Alabama
15	Ervin Thomas	Forward	6–5	197	Senior	Chicago, Illinois
21	Darryl Wright	Forward	6–5	202	Senior	Memphis, Tennessee
22	Blake Ralling	Forward	6–6	211	Junior	Smyrna, Georgia
23	James Currington	Forward	6–6	186	Freshman	Tuscaloosa, Alabama
24	Anthony McDonald	Guard	6–1	180	Junior	Aberdeen, Mississippi
25	Jurmelle Hall	Guard	6–2	185	Junior	Tchula, Mississippi
31	Julius Francis	Center	6–11	255	Senior	Gaithersburg, Maryland
32	Ben Milshtein	Forward	6–8	225	Sophomore	Israel
33	Daniel Hurtt	Forward	6–6	235	Freshman	Kansas City, Missouri

== Schedule ==
Date time, TV	Opponent	Result	Record	Site (attendance) city, state
Exhibition
10/30/2013*; 7:00 pm	Victory	W 112–78		Harrison HPER Complex (N/A); Itta Bena, MS
11/04/2013*; 7:00 pm	at Delta State	L 68–78		Sillers Coliseum (1,475); Cleveland, MS
Regular season
11/08/2013*; 7:00 pm	at No. 8 Oklahoma State	L 62–117	0–1	Gallagher-Iba Arena (9,402); Oxford, MS
11/11/2013*; 7:00 pm, FSSW	at Texas A&M	L 67–91	0–2	Reed Arena (4,240); College Station, TX
11/15/2013*; 6:00 pm	Champion Baptist	W 108–48	1–2	Leflore County Civic Center (429); Greenwood, MS
11/19/2013*; 7:00 pm	at Mississippi State	L 72–94	1–3	Humphrey Coliseum (6,759); Starkville, MS
11/22/2013*; 7:00 pm	at Ole Miss; Barclays Center Classic	L 82–111	1–4	Tad Smith Coliseum (6,267); Oxford, MS
11/26/2013*; 6:00 pm, ESPN3	at Georgia Tech; Barclays Center Classic	L 59–76	1–5	McCamish Pavilion (5,369); Atlanta, GA
11/29/2013*; 6:00 pm	at Monmouth; Barclays Center Classic	L 79–81	1–6	Multipurpose Activity Center (1,150); West Long Branch, NJ
11/30/2013*; 3:30 pm	vs. Longwood; Barclays Center Classic	W 90–89	2–6	Multipurpose Activity Center (250); West Long Branch, NJ
12/07/2013*; 4:00 pm	Tougaloo	W 89–81	3–6	Leflore County Civic Center (N/A); Greenwood, MS
12/16/2013*; 6:00 pm, BTN	at Northwestern	L 64–86	3–7	Welsh-Ryan Arena (5,344); Evanston, IL
12/27/2013*; 9:30 pm, P12N	at Washington	L 80–95	3–8	Alaska Airlines Arena (6,351); Seattle, WA
12/28/2013*; 7:00 pm, P12N	at Washington State	L 48–85	3–9	Beasley Coliseum (1,952); Pullman, WA
12/31/2013*; 2:00 pm	Selma	W 99–87	4–9	The Pinnacle (498); Clarksdale, MS
01/04/2014; 5:00 pm	Arkansas–Pine Bluff	L 73–78	4–10 (0–1)	Leflore County Civic Center (902); Greenwood, MS
01/11/2014; 5:00 pm	at Alabama State	L 62–93	4–11 (0–2)	Dunn–Oliver Acadome (576); Montgomery, AL
01/13/2014; 5:00 pm	at Alabama A&M	L 59–68	4–12 (0–3)	Elmore Gymnasium (1,461); Huntsville, AL
01/18/2014; 5:00 pm	Alcorn State	L 53–65	4–13 (0–4)	Leflore County Civic Center (1,093); Greenwood, MS
01/22/2014; 7:30 pm	Southern	W 72–64	5–13 (1–4)	Leflore County Civic Center (1,302); Greenwood, MS
01/25/2014; 8:00 pm	at Texas Southern	L 56–94	5–14 (1–5)	H&PE Arena (1,578); Houston, TX
01/27/2014; 8:00 pm	at Prairie View A&M	W 81–72	6–14 (2–5)	William Nicks Building (2,115); Prairie View, TX
02/01/2014; 5:00 pm	Jackson State	W 69–66	7–14 (3–5)	Leflore County Civic Center (3,402); Greenwood, MS
02/03/2014; 8:00 pm	Grambling State	W 75–67	8–14 (4–5)	Leflore County Civic Center (1,927); Greenwood, MS
02/08/2014; 5:00 pm	Alabama State	L 70–75	8–15 (4–6)	Leflore County Civic Center (2,798); Greenwood, MS
02/10/2014; 8:00 pm	Alabama A&M	L 82–91	8–16 (4–7)	Leflore County Civic Center (1,098); Greenwood, MS
02/15/2014; 5:00 pm	at Alcorn State	L 63–67	8–17 (4–8)	Davey Whitney Complex (1,452); Lorman, MS
02/17/2014; 7:00 pm, ESPNU	at Southern	L 74–83	8–18 (4–9)	F.G. Clark Center (2,250); Baton Rouge, LA
02/22/2014; 5:00 pm	Texas Southern	L 65–73	8–19 (4–10)	Leflore County Civic Center (1,387); Greenwood, MS
02/24/2014; 8:00 pm	Prairie View A&M	W 75–69	9–19 (5–10)	Leflore County Civic Center (1,237); Greenwood, MS
03/01/2014; 5:00 pm	at Jackson State	L 64–82	9–20 (5–11)	Williams Assembly Center (1,584); Jackson, MS
03/03/2014; 7:00 pm	at Grambling State	L 70–72	9–21 (5–12)	Fredrick C. Hobdy Assembly Center (675); Grambling, LA
03/08/2014; 7:30 pm	at Arkansas–Pine Bluff	L 68–83	9–22 (5–13)	K. L. Johnson Complex (4,337); Pine Bluff, AR
2014 SWAC tournament
03/11/2014; 8:00 pm	vs. Prairie View A&M	L 63–79	9–23	Toyota Center (2,000); Houston, TX
*Non-conference game. ^{#}Rankings from AP Poll. (#) Tournament seedings in parentheses. All times are in Central Time.
