= 2013–14 Texas Southern Tigers basketball team =

American college basketball season

2013–14 Texas Southern Tigers men's basketball
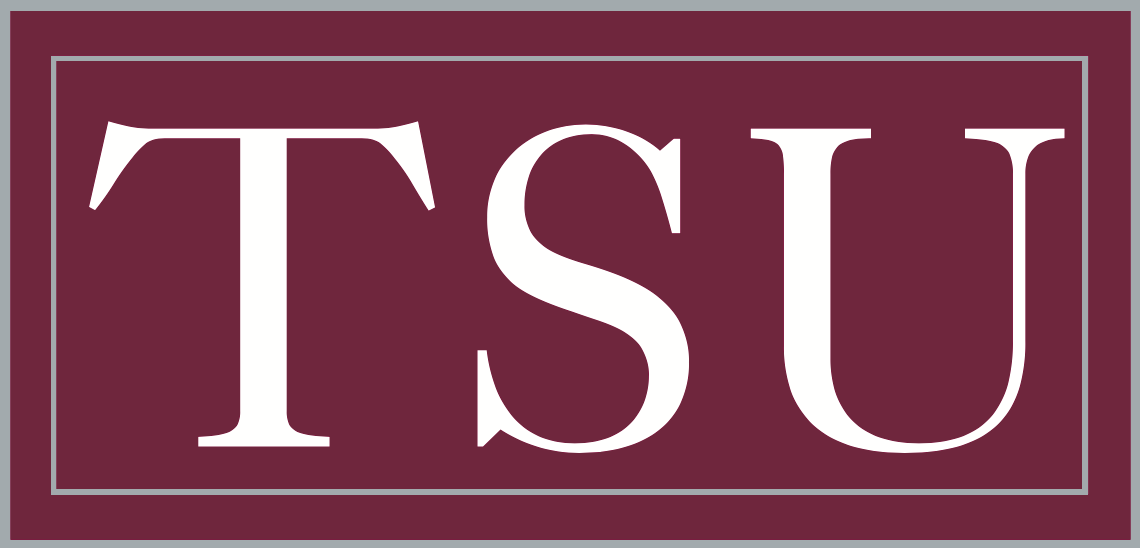

SWAC tournament champions

NCAA tournament, first round
- Conference: Southwestern Athletic Conference
- Record: 19–15 (12–6 SWAC)
- Head coach: Mike Davis (2nd season)
- Assistant coaches: Donald Marsh; Michael Davis, Jr.; Walter Pitts
- Home arena: Health and Physical Education Arena

2013–14 SWAC men's basketball standings
	Conf.				Overall
Team	W		L	PCT	W		L	PCT
Southern*	15	–	3	.833	19	–	13	.594
Texas Southern †	12	–	6	.667	19	–	15	.559
Alabama State	12	–	6	.667	19	–	13	.594
Arkansas–Pine Bluff*	11	–	7	.611	13	–	18	.419
Alabama A&M	10	–	8	.556	14	–	16	.467
Alcorn State**	9	–	9	.500	12	–	19	.387
Jackson State	7	–	11	.389	11	–	20	.355
Prairie View A&M	6	–	12	.333	11	–	23	.324
Mississippi Valley State*	5	–	13	.278	9	–	23	.281
Grambling State*	3	–	15	.167	5	–	24	.172
† 2014 SWAC tournament winner Rankings from AP poll *ineligible for postseason play due to APR penalties **Handed a L1 APR penalty, but eligible for postseason

The 2013–14 Texas Southern Tigers basketball team represented Texas Southern University during the 2013–14 NCAA Division I men's basketball season. The Tigers, led by second year head coach Mike Davis, played their home games at the Health and Physical Education Arena and were members of the Southwestern Athletic Conference. They finished the season 19–15, 12–6 in SWAC play to finish in second place. They were champions of the SWAC tournament to earn an automatic bid to the NCAA tournament where they lost in the First Four to Cal Poly.

== Roster ==
Number	Name	Position	Height	Weight	Year	Hometown
2	Edward Chung	Guard	5–9	150	Freshman	Houston, Texas
3	Madarious Gibbs	Guard	6–1	190	Junior	Newnan, Georgia
4	Jose Rodriguez	Forward	6–7	215	Junior	The Bronx, New York
5	Tyree Bynum	Guard	5–9	165	Freshman	Philadelphia, Pennsylvania
11	Lawrence Johnson-Danner	Guard	6–4	190	Senior	Detroit, Michigan
12	Eric Washington Jr.	Forward	6–4	210	Freshman	Birmingham, Alabama
14	Ray Penn	Guard	5–9	160	Senior	Houston, Texas
15	D' Angelo Scott	Forward	6–7	215	Senior	Los Angeles, California
20	Vicktor Amick	Forward	6–6	210	Freshman	Dallas, Texas
23	Victor Haywood-Harris	Forward	6–6	195	Freshman	Dallas, Texas
24	Aaric Murray	Center	6–10	245	Graduate student	Philadelphia, Pennsylvania
25	Davonte Chaney	Forward	6–2	185	Junior	Kansas City, Missouri
32	Aaron Clayborn	Forward	6–7	240	Senior	Benton Harbor, Michigan
33	Bobby Griffin	Guard	6–1	140	Freshman	Dallas, Texas
34	Christian McCoggle	Center	6–8	220	Freshman	Dallas, Texas

== Schedule ==
Date time, TV	Rank^{#}	Opponent^{#}	Result	Record	Site (attendance) city, state
Regular season
November 9, 2013*; 5:00 pm		Norfolk State	W 95–83	1–0	Health and Physical Education Arena (1,983); Houston, TX
November 11, 2013*; 2:00 pm		Wiley	W 113–96	2–0	Health and Physical Education Arena (1,042); Houston, TX
November 14, 2013*; 6:00 pm		at Miami (FL)	L 69–84	2–1	BankUnited Center (4,728); Coral Gables, FL
November 16, 2013*; 7:00 pm		at FIU	L 68–70	2–2	U.S. Century Bank Arena (1,348); Miami, FL
November 18, 2013*; 8:00 pm		at Texas Tech; Legends Classic	L 71–80	2–3	United Spirit Arena (4,682); Lubbock, TX
November 21, 2013*; 7:00 pm		at Stanford; Legends Classic	L 71–97	2–4	Maples Pavilion (4,682); Stanford, CA
November 25, 2013*; 5:30 pm		vs. Lehigh; Legends Classic	L 63–67	2–5	Frost Arena (254); Sioux Falls, SD
November 26, 2013*; 5:30 pm		vs. Howard; Legends Classic	W 63–54	3–5	Frost Arena (234); Sioux Falls, SD
December 4, 2013*; 7:00 pm		at Tulsa	L 71–98	3–6	Reynolds Center (3,806); Tulsa, OK
December 15, 2013*; 4:00 pm		at Cal State Fullerton	L 80–87	3–7	Titan Gym (573); Fullerton, CA
December 18, 2013*; 7:00 pm		at Temple	W 90–89	4–7	Liacouras Center (4,682); Philadelphia, PA
December 29, 2013*; 1:00 pm		at TCU	L 64–77	4–8	Daniel–Meyer Coliseum (4,146); Fort Worth, TX
January 4, 2014; 5:00 pm		Alcorn State	W 83–66	5–8 (1–0)	Health and Physical Education Arena (1,042); Houston, TX
January 6, 2014; 8:00 pm, ESPNU		Southern	L 71–79	5–9 (1–1)	Health and Physical Education Arena (1,721); Houston, TX
January 11, 2014; 7:30 pm		Prairie View A&M	W 87–83 ^{3OT}	6–9 (2–1)	Health and Physical Education Arena (6,482); Houston, TX
January 18, 2014; 7:30 pm		at Grambling State	W 74–72	7–9 (3–1)	Fredrick C. Hobdy Assembly Center (1,738); Grambling, LA
January 20, 2014; 7:30 pm		at Jackson State	L 80–84	7–10 (3–2)	Williams Assembly Center (932); Jackson, MS
January 25, 2014; 7:30 pm		Mississippi Valley State	W 94–56	8–10 (4–2)	Health and Physical Education Arena (1,578); Houston, TX
January 27, 2014; 8:00 pm		Arkansas–Pine Bluff	W 72–71	9–10 (5–2)	Health and Physical Education Arena (2,148); Houston, TX
February 1, 2014; 6:00 pm		at Alabama A&M	L 62–63	9–11 (5–3)	Elmore Gymnasium (1,613); Huntsville, AL
February 3, 2014; 7:30 pm		at Alabama State	L 73–79 ^{OT}	9–12 (5–4)	Dunn–Oliver Acadome (N/A); Montgomery, AL
February 8, 2014; 7:30 pm		at Prairie View A&M	L 77–85	9–13 (5–5)	William Nicks Building (3,980); Prairie View, TX
February 15, 2014; 5:00 pm		Grambling State	W 74–71	10–13 (6–5)	Health and Physical Education Arena (2,014); Houston, TX
February 17, 2014; 7:30 pm		Jackson State	W 75–73	10–14 (6–6)	Health and Physical Education Arena (2,142); Houston, TX
February 22, 2014; 5:00 pm		at Mississippi Valley State	W 73–65	11–14 (7–6)	Leflore County Civic Center (1,387); Greenwood, MS
February 24, 2014; 7:30 pm		at Arkansas–Pine Bluff	W 65–55	12–14 (8–6)	K. L. Johnson Complex (3,235); Pine Bluff, AR
March 1, 2014; 5:00 pm		Alabama State	W 86–66	13–14 (9–6)	Health and Physical Education Arena (2,421); Houston, TX
March 3, 2014; 7:30 pm		Alabama A&M	W 79–58	14–14 (10–6)	Health and Physical Education Arena (1,425); Houston, TX
March 6, 2014; 7:30 pm		at Alcorn State	W 77–69	15–14 (11–6)	Davey Whitney Complex (727); Lorman, MS
March 8, 2014; 5:00 pm		at Southern	W 67–64	16–14 (12–6)	F.G. Clark Center (1,989); Baton Rouge, LA
SWAC tournament
March 12, 2014; 12:30 pm		vs. Grambling State; Quarterfinals	W 79–54	17–14	Toyota Center (1,500); Houston, TX
March 14, 2014; 2:30 pm		vs. Alabama State; Semifinals	W 73–61	18–14	Toyota Center (N/A); Houston, TX
March 15, 2014; 3:30 pm, ESPN2		vs. Prairie View A&M; Championship	W 78–73	19–14	Toyota Center (8,058); Houston, TX
NCAA tournament
March 19, 2014*; 5:40 pm, truTV	(16 MW)	vs. (16 MW) Cal Poly; First Four	L 69–81	19–15	UD Arena (11,534); Dayton, OH
*Non-conference game. ^{#}Rankings from AP Poll. (#) Tournament seedings in parentheses. MW=Midwest region. All times are in Central Time.
