= 2013–14 Grambling State Tigers men's basketball team =

American college basketball season

2013–14 Grambling State Tigers men's basketball
- Conference: Southwestern Athletic Conference
- Record: 5–24 (3–15 SWAC)
- Head coach: Joseph Price (2nd season)
- Assistant coach: Ray Martin
- Home arena: Fredrick C. Hobdy Assembly Center

2013–14 SWAC men's basketball standings
	Conf.				Overall
Team	W		L	PCT	W		L	PCT
Southern*	15	–	3	.833	19	–	13	.594
Texas Southern †	12	–	6	.667	19	–	15	.559
Alabama State	12	–	6	.667	19	–	13	.594
Arkansas–Pine Bluff*	11	–	7	.611	13	–	18	.419
Alabama A&M	10	–	8	.556	14	–	16	.467
Alcorn State**	9	–	9	.500	12	–	19	.387
Jackson State	7	–	11	.389	11	–	20	.355
Prairie View A&M	6	–	12	.333	11	–	23	.324
Mississippi Valley State*	5	–	13	.278	9	–	23	.281
Grambling State*	3	–	15	.167	5	–	24	.172
† 2014 SWAC tournament winner Rankings from AP poll *ineligible for postseason play due to APR penalties **Handed a L1 APR penalty, but eligible for postseason

The 2013–14 Grambling State Tigers men's basketball team represented Grambling State University during the 2013–14 NCAA Division I men's basketball season. The Tigers, led by second-year head coach Joseph Price, played their home games at the Fredrick C. Hobdy Assembly Center and were members of the Southwestern Athletic Conference (SWAC). They finished the season 5–24, 3–15 in SWAC play, to finish in last place. They were ineligible for postseason play due to Academic Progress Rate (APR) penalties. However, the SWAC received a waiver to allow Grambling State's teams under APR penalties to still participate in the SWAC tournament where they advanced to the quarterfinals, losing to Texas Southern.

== Roster ==
Number	Name	Position	Height	Weight	Year	Hometown
1	A'Torri Shine	Guard	6'5"	202	Junior	Minden, LA
2	Richard Freeman	Guard/forward	6'8"	205	Freshman	Indianapolis, IN
3	Tyron Bain	Guard	6'2"	165	Senior	Miami, FL
4	Remond Brown	Guard	6'3"	200	Freshman	Monroe, LA
5	Antwan Scott	Guard	6'1"	180	Junior	Dallas, TX
10	Chase Comier	Guard	5'11"	175	Freshman	Baltimore, MD
11	Valerio Altheimer	Guard	6'2"	190	Freshman	Jonesboro, LA
20	Terry Rose	Guard/forward	6'4"	195	Sophomore	Davenport, FL
22	Brauhnye' Turner	Forward	6'4"	205	Sophomore	Grambling, LA
24	Dion Watson	Guard	6'0"	190	Senior	West Palm Beach, FL
32	Chandler Thomas	Guard/forward	6'6"	220	Sophomore	Indianapolis, IN
33	Windale Glinton	Forward/center	6'9"	226	Freshman	Lake Worth, FL
42	Steven Danridge	Forward/center	6'8"	260	Senior	Dolton, IL
44	Traavis Hawkins	Forward	6'6"	230	Junior	Shreveport, LA

== Schedule ==
Date time, TV	Opponent	Result	Record	Site (attendance) city, state
Regular season
November 9, 2013*; 3:00 p.m.	at DePaul	L 58–96	0–1	Sullivan Athletic Center (3,254); Chicago, IL
November 12, 2013*; 6:00 p.m., FS1	at No. 17 Marquette	L 74–114	0–2	BMO Harris Bradley Center (13,372); Milwaukee, WI
November 20, 2013*; 7:00 p.m.	at Missouri State	L 67–97	0–3	JQH Arena (4,216); Springfield, MO
December 14, 2013*; 12:00 p.m., P12N	at Arizona State	L 55–97	0–4	Wells Fargo Arena (4,714); Tempe, AZ
December 16, 2013*; 7:30 p.m.	Central Baptist	W 83–75	1–4	Fredrick C. Hobdy Assembly Center (N/A); Grambling, LA
December 19, 2013*; 7:00 p.m.	at TCU	L 75–98	1–5	Daniel–Meyer Coliseum (4,288); Fort Worth, TX
December 21, 2013*; 3:00 p.m.	Lyon	L 54–55	1–6	Fredrick C. Hobdy Assembly Center (N/A); Grambling, LA
December 28, 2013*; 1:00 p.m.	at Evansville	L 61–96	1–7	Ford Center (3,712); Evansville, IN
December 30, 2013*; 7:00 p.m.	at Arkansas–Little Rock	L 68–88	1–8	Jack Stephens Center (2,813); Little Rock, AR
January 4, 2014; 5:00 p.m.	Alabama State	L 51–68	1–9 (0–1)	Fredrick C. Hobdy Assembly Center (1,607); Grambling, LA
January 6, 2014; 7:30 p.m.	Alabama A&M	L 58–70	1–10 (0–2)	Fredrick C. Hobdy Assembly Center (1,735); Grambling, LA
January 11, 2014; 4:00 p.m.	at Southern	L 49–73	1–11 (0–3)	F.G. Clark Center (2,199); Baton Rouge, LA
January 13, 2014; 7:30 p.m.	at Alcorn State	L 56–64	1–12 (0–4)	Davey Whitney Complex (1,139); Lorman, MS
January 18, 2014; 5:00 p.m.	Texas Southern	L 72–74	1–13 (0–5)	Fredrick C. Hobdy Assembly Center (1,738); Grambling, LA
January 20, 2014; 7:30 p.m.	Prairie View A&M	L 82–83	1–14 (0–6)	Fredrick C. Hobdy Assembly Center (1,716); Grambling, LA
January 25, 2014; 5:00 p.m.	at Jackson State	L 59–76	1–15 (0–7)	Williams Assembly Center (1,003); Jackson, MS
February 1, 2014; 7:00 p.m.	at Arkansas–Pine Bluff	L 64–66	1–16 (0–8)	K. L. Johnson Complex (4,287); Pine Bluff, AR
February 3, 2014; 7:30 p.m.	at Mississippi Valley State	L 67–75	1–17 (0–9)	Leflore County Civic Center (1,927); Greenwood, MS
February 8, 2014; 5:00 p.m.	Southern	L 54–104	1–18 (0–10)	Fredrick C. Hobdy Assembly Center (3,750); Grambling, LA
February 10, 2014; 7:30 p.m.	Alcorn State	W 95–80	2–18 (1–10)	Fredrick C. Hobdy Assembly Center (2,723); Grambling, LA
February 15, 2014; 7:30 p.m.	at Texas Southern	L 71–74	2–19 (1–11)	Health and Physical Education Arena (2,014); Houston, TX
February 17, 2014; 5:00 p.m.	at Prairie View A&M	W 83–81	3–19 (2–11)	William Nicks Building (1,995); Prairie View, TX
February 22, 2014; 5:00 p.m.	Jackson State	L 59–79	3–20 (2–12)	Fredrick C. Hobdy Assembly Center (2,756); Grambling, LA
March 1, 2014; 5:00 p.m.	Arkansas–Pine Bluff	L 52–61	3–21 (2–13)	Fredrick C. Hobdy Assembly Center (300); Grambling, LA
March 3, 2014; 7:30 p.m.	Mississippi Valley State	W 72–70	4–21 (3–13)	Fredrick C. Hobdy Assembly Center (675); Grambling, LA
March 6, 2014; 7:30 p.m.	at Alabama State	L 66–68	4–22 (3–14)	Dunn–Oliver Acadome (1,736); Montgomery, AL
March 8, 2014; 7:30 p.m.	at Alabama A&M	L 63–80	4–23 (3–15)	Elmore Gymnasium (1,169); Huntsville, AL
2014 SWAC tournament
March 11, 2014; 12:30 p.m.	vs. Jackson State; First round	W 84–75	5–23	Toyota Center (N/A); Houston, TX
March 12, 2014; 12:30 p.m.	vs. Texas Southern; Quarterfinals	L 54–79	5–24	Toyota Center (1,500); Houston, TX
*Non-conference game. ^{#}Rankings from AP poll. (#) Tournament seedings in parentheses. All times are in Central.
