= 2014 SWAC men's basketball tournament =

- Classification: Division I
- Season: 2013–14
- Teams: 10
- Site: Toyota Center; Houston, Texas
- Champions: Texas Southern (5th title)
- Winning coach: Mike Davis (1st title)
- MVP: Aaric Murray (Texas Southern)
- Television: ESPN2 (final)

2013–14 SWAC men's basketball standings
	Conf.				Overall
Team	W		L	PCT	W		L	PCT
Southern*	15	–	3	.833	19	–	13	.594
Texas Southern †	12	–	6	.667	19	–	15	.559
Alabama State	12	–	6	.667	19	–	13	.594
Arkansas–Pine Bluff*	11	–	7	.611	13	–	18	.419
Alabama A&M	10	–	8	.556	14	–	16	.467
Alcorn State**	9	–	9	.500	12	–	19	.387
Jackson State	7	–	11	.389	11	–	20	.355
Prairie View A&M	6	–	12	.333	11	–	23	.324
Mississippi Valley State*	5	–	13	.278	9	–	23	.281
Grambling State*	3	–	15	.167	5	–	24	.172
† 2014 SWAC tournament winner Rankings from AP poll *ineligible for postseason play due to APR penalties **Handed a L1 APR penalty, but eligible for postseason

The 2014 SWAC men's basketball tournament took place March 11–15 at the Toyota Center in Houston, Texas.

== Format ==
Ten teams participated in the 2014 tournament. Arkansas-Pine Bluff, Grambling State, Mississippi Valley State, and Southern University each received one-year postseason bans in men's basketball, thus were not allowed to participate in the 2014 SWAC Tournament, due to failing to meet the NCAA's APR requirements.

On March 1, 2014, the NCAA Selection Committee announced that the SWAC received a special exemption from the NCAA men's basketball selection committee to adjust which team earns its automatic berth to the tournament, All four ineligible teams will be allowed to play in the tourney due to only six teams being eligible. If one of the four ineligible teams wins the tournament, the team among the six eligible teams that advances the furthest in the tournament will receive the NCAA tournament bid. In the event of a tie (for example, all tournament-eligible teams are eliminated in the same round), the automatic berths will go to the highest-seeded team. With all four ineligible teams being eliminated in the quarterfinals or before, this contingency was rendered moot, and the tournament winner received an automatic berth after all.

== Schedule ==
Session	Game	Time*	Matchup^{#}	Television	Score
First round – Tuesday, March 11
1	1	12:30 pm	#7 Jackson State vs. #10 Grambling State*		84–75
1	2	8:00 pm	#8 Prairie View A&M vs. #9 Mississippi Valley State*		79–63
Quarterfinals – Wednesday, March 12
2	3	12:30 pm	#10 Grambling State vs. #2 Texas Southern		79–54
2	4	8:00 pm	#8 Prairie View A&M vs. #1 Southern*		64–46
Quarterfinals – Thursday, March 13
3	5	12:30 pm	#3 Alabama State vs. #6 Alcorn State		64–51
3	6	8:00 pm	#4 Arkansas–Pine Bluff* vs. #5 Alabama A&M		69–50
Semifinals – Friday, March 14
4	7	2:30 pm	#2 Texas Southern vs. #3 Alabama State		73–61
4	8	8:30 pm	#8 Prairie View A&M vs. #5 Alabama A&M		55–49
Championship – Saturday, March 15
5	9	3:30 pm	#2 Texas Southern vs. #8 Prairie View A&M	ESPN2	78–73

*Game times in Central Time. #Rankings denote tournament seeding.

== Bracket ==
First round Tuesday, March 11
8	Prairie View A&M	79
9	Mississippi Valley St*	63
7	Jackson State	75
10	Grambling State*	84

Quarterfinals; Wednesday, March 12; Thursday, March 13
1	Southern*	46
8	Prairie View A&M	64
4	Arkansas–Pine Bluff*	50
5	Alabama A&M	69
2	Texas Southern	79
10	Grambling State*	54
3	Alabama State	64
6	Alcorn State	61

Semifinals; Friday, March 14
8	Prairie View A&M	55
5	Alabama A&M	49
2	Texas Southern	73
3	Alabama State	61

Championship; Saturday, March 15; ESPN2
8	Prairie View A&M	73
2	Texas Southern	78

* Ineligible for postseason play due to APR penalties
