= 2013–14 Southern Jaguars basketball team =

American college basketball season

2013–14 Southern Jaguars basketball
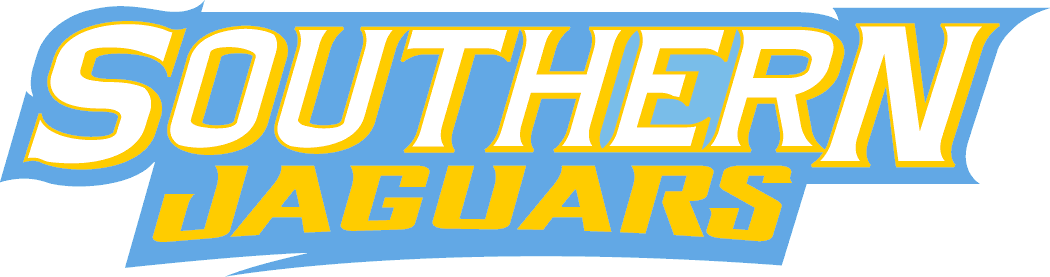

SWAC Regular Season Champions
- Conference: Southwestern Athletic Conference
- Record: 19–13 (15–3 SWAC)
- Head coach: Roman Banks (3rd season)
- Assistant coaches: Rodney Kirschner; Ryan Price; Morris Scott
- Home arena: F. G. Clark Center

2013–14 SWAC men's basketball standings
	Conf.				Overall
Team	W		L	PCT	W		L	PCT
Southern*	15	–	3	.833	19	–	13	.594
Texas Southern †	12	–	6	.667	19	–	15	.559
Alabama State	12	–	6	.667	19	–	13	.594
Arkansas–Pine Bluff*	11	–	7	.611	13	–	18	.419
Alabama A&M	10	–	8	.556	14	–	16	.467
Alcorn State**	9	–	9	.500	12	–	19	.387
Jackson State	7	–	11	.389	11	–	20	.355
Prairie View A&M	6	–	12	.333	11	–	23	.324
Mississippi Valley State*	5	–	13	.278	9	–	23	.281
Grambling State*	3	–	15	.167	5	–	24	.172
† 2014 SWAC tournament winner Rankings from AP poll *ineligible for postseason play due to APR penalties **Handed a L1 APR penalty, but eligible for postseason

The 2013–14 Southern Jaguars basketball team represented Southern University during the 2013–14 NCAA Division I men's basketball season. The Jaguars, led by third year head coach Roman Banks, played their home games at the F. G. Clark Center and were members of the Southwestern Athletic Conference. They finished the season 19–13, 15–3 in SWAC play to win the regular season conference championship. They were ineligible for postseason play due to APR penalties. However, the SWAC received a waiver to allow its teams under APR penalties to still participate in the SWAC tournament where the Jaguars lost in the quarterfinals to Prairie View A&M.

== Roster ==
Number	Name	Position	Height	Weight	Year	Hometown
0	Christopher Hyder	Guard	5–11	170	Sophomore	Dallas, Texas
1	Damien Goodwin	Forward	6–8	200	RS–Freshman	Atlanta, Georgia
3	Trelun Banks	Guard	6–1	170	Freshman	Shreveport, Louisiana
4	Keith Davis	Forward	6–10	231	Junior	Dallas, Texas
5	Michael Harrel	Guard	5–11	180	Junior	Baton Rouge, Louisiana
10	Cameron Monroe	Guard	6–2	200	Junior	Shreveport, Louisiana
12	Bryce Clark	Forward	6–7	215	Senior	Fort Lauderdale, Florida
20	Calvin Godfrey	Forward	6–9	210	Junior	Milwaukee, Wisconsin
22	Frank Snow	Center	6–10	230	Junior	Wellington, Florida
23	Yondarius Johnson	Guard	6–4	190	Senior	Plain Dealing, Louisiana
25	Elex Carter	Forward	6–7	190	Freshman	LaPlace, Louisiana
30	Tre Lynch	Guard	6–0	160	Senior	Lancaster, Texas
32	Dechriston McKinney	Forward	6–6	210	Freshman	Waco, Texas
33	Malcolm Miller	Guard	6–6	200	Senior	Midland, Texas
44	Javan Mitchell	Center	6–9	250	Senior	St. Martinville, Louisiana

== Schedule ==
Date time, TV	Opponent	Result	Record	Site (attendance) city, state
Regular season
11/08/2013*; 7:00 pm, FSN	at No. 17 Marquette	L 56–63	0–1	BMO Harris Bradley Center (14,269); Milwaukee, WI
11/10/2013*; 4:00 pm	at Middle Tennessee; Global Sports Challenge	L 75–78	0–2	Murphy Center (3,307); Murfreesboro, TN
11/13/2013*; 7:00 pm	Tulane	L 73–79	0–3	F.G. Clark Center (2,796); Baton Rouge, LA
11/16/2013*; 6:00 pm	at North Florida; Global Sports Showcase	W 87–78	1–3	UNF Arena (1,794); Jacksonville, FL
11/18/2013*; 6:00 pm, ESPN3	at No. 16 Florida; Global Sports Showcase	L 53–67	1–4	O'Connell Center (8,002); Gainesville, FL
11/22/2013*; 7:00 pm	Arkansas–Little Rock; Global Sports Showcase	L 82–85 ^{OT}	1–5	F.G. Clark Center (1,381); Baton Rouge, LA
11/25/2013*; 7:00 pm	Blue Mountain	W 76–59	2–5	F.G. Clark Center (378); Baton Rouge, LA
12/03/2013*; 8:00 pm	at Denver	L 74–75 ^{OT}	2–6	Magness Arena (1,444); Denver, CO
12/07/2013*; 7:00 pm	at Louisiana Tech	L 50-69	2–7	Thomas Assembly Center (3,629); Ruston, LA
12/14/2013*; 7:00 pm	Dillard	W 107–64	3–7	F.G. Clark Center (511); Baton Rouge, LA
12/19/2013*; 8:00 pm, P12N	at No. 1 Arizona	L 43–69	3–8	McKale Center (14,149); Tucson, AZ
12/22/2013*; 4:00 pm, FSSW	at No. 12 Baylor	L 56–81	3–9	Ferrell Center (5,562); Waco, TX
12/30/2013*; 7:00 pm	Champion Baptist	W 116–12	4–9	F.G. Clark Center (210); Baton Rouge, LA
01/04/2014; 4:00 pm	at Prairie View A&M	W 60–57	5–9 (1–0)	William Nicks Building (546); Prairie View, TX
01/06/2014; 8:00 pm, ESPNU	at Texas Southern	W 79–71	6–9 (2–0)	H&PE Arena (1,721); Houston, TX
01/11/2014; 5:00 pm	Grambling State	W 73–49	7–9 (3–0)	F.G. Clark Center (2,199); Baton Rouge, LA
01/13/2014; 7:30 pm	Jackson State	W 60–36	8–9 (4–0)	F.G. Clark Center (2,140); Baton Rouge, LA
01/18/2014; 4:00 pm	at Arkansas–Pine Bluff	W 60–56	9–9 (5–0)	K. L. Johnson Complex (4,976); Pine Bluff, AR
01/22/2014; 7:30 pm	at Mississippi Valley State	L 64–72	9–10 (5–1)	Leflore County Civic Center (1,302); Greenwood, MS
01/25/2014; 8:00 pm, CST	Alabama A&M	W 66–52	10–10 (6–1)	F.G. Clark Center (1,165); Baton Rouge, LA
01/27/2014; 8:00 pm, CST	Alabama State	W 68–55	11–10 (7–1)	F.G. Clark Center (1,438); Baton Rouge, LA
02/01/2014; 8:00 pm	Alcorn State	W 62–54	12–10 (8–1)	F.G. Clark Center (1,670); Baton Rouge, LA
02/08/2014; 4:00 pm	at Grambling State	W 104–54	13–10 (9–1)	Memorial Gymnasium (3,750); Grambling, LA
02/10/2014; 7:30 pm	at Jackson State	W 68–63	14–10 (10–1)	Williams Assembly Center (1,025); Jackson, MS
02/15/2014; 5:00 pm	Arkansas–Pine Bluff	L 58–64	14–11 (10–2)	F.G. Clark Center (986); Baton Rouge, LA
02/17/2014; 7:00 pm, ESPNU	Mississippi Valley State	W 83–74	15–11 (11–2)	F.G. Clark Center (2,250); Baton Rouge, LA
02/22/2014; 4:00 pm	at Alabama A&M	W 70–62	16–11 (12–2)	Elmore Gymnasium (1,261); Huntsville, AL
02/24/2014; 7:00 pm	at Alabama State	W 87–64	17–11 (13–2)	Dunn–Oliver Acadome (3,376); Montgomery, AL
03/01/2014; 8:00 pm	at Alcorn State	W 67–54	18–11 (14–2)	Davey Whitney Complex (1,093); Lorman, MS
03/06/2014; 7:30 pm	Prairie View A&M	W 91–59	19–11 (15–2)	F.G. Clark Center (1,244); Baton Rouge, LA
03/08/2014; 5:30 pm, CST	Texas Southern	L 64–67	19–12 (15–3)	F.G. Clark Center (1,989); Baton Rouge, LA
SWAC tournament
03/12/14; 8:00 pm	vs. Prairie View A&M; Quarterfinals	L 46–64	19–13	Toyota Center (3,624); Houston, TX
*Non-conference game. ^{#}Rankings from AP Poll. (#) Tournament seedings in parentheses. All times are in Central Time.
