= 2013–14 Alabama State Hornets basketball team =

American college basketball season

2013–14 Alabama State Hornets men's basketball
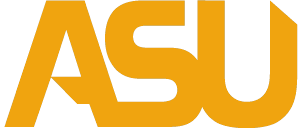

CIT, First round
- Conference: Southwestern Athletic Conference
- Record: 19–13 (12–6 SWAC)
- Head coach: Lewis Jackson (9th season)
- Assistant coaches: Anthony Sewell; Steve Rogers; Michael Curry
- Home arena: Dunn–Oliver Acadome

2013–14 SWAC men's basketball standings
	Conf.				Overall
Team	W		L	PCT	W		L	PCT
Southern*	15	–	3	.833	19	–	13	.594
Texas Southern †	12	–	6	.667	19	–	15	.559
Alabama State	12	–	6	.667	19	–	13	.594
Arkansas–Pine Bluff*	11	–	7	.611	13	–	18	.419
Alabama A&M	10	–	8	.556	14	–	16	.467
Alcorn State**	9	–	9	.500	12	–	19	.387
Jackson State	7	–	11	.389	11	–	20	.355
Prairie View A&M	6	–	12	.333	11	–	23	.324
Mississippi Valley State*	5	–	13	.278	9	–	23	.281
Grambling State*	3	–	15	.167	5	–	24	.172
† 2014 SWAC tournament winner Rankings from AP poll *ineligible for postseason play due to APR penalties **Handed a L1 APR penalty, but eligible for postseason

The 2013–14 Alabama State Hornets basketball team represented Alabama State University during the 2013–14 NCAA Division I men's basketball season. The Hornets, led by ninth year head coach Lewis Jackson, played their home games at the Dunn–Oliver Acadome as members of the Southwestern Athletic Conference. They finished the season 19–13, 12–6 in SWAC play to finish in a tie for second place. They advanced to the semifinals of the SWAC tournament where they lost to Texas Southern. They were invited to the CollegeInsider.com Tournament where they lost in the first round to Sam Houston State.

== Season ==
=== Preseason ===
Head coach Lewis Jackson released the team's complete season schedule on September 27, 2013. Road games at Illinois and Bradley as part of the Global Sports Invitational, as well as participation in the Tulane Classic, highlighted the non-conference schedule. Per usual, the SWAC conference slate included one home game and one away game against each of the nine other members of the conference.

=== November ===
On November 8, the Hornets traveled to Champaign, Illinois to take on the Illinois Fighting Illini, a participant in the 2013 NCAA tournament. Jamel Waters scored 27 points, nearly half of the Hornets' total (63), but a weak defensive effort by Alabama State allowed the Illini to shoot 44% from the floor and attempt 30 free throws. The Hornets ultimately fell, 63–80. The Hornets continued their brief road trip on the 10th when they went south to Peoria, Illinois to play Missouri Valley Conference member Bradley. Waters led the Hornets again with 14 points, but another poor defensive effort allowed the Braves to shoot 59% from the field while limiting Alabama State to just 38%, leading to an 85–59 victory for Bradley.

The Hornets returned home to the Dunn–Oliver Acadome on November 13 to take on NAIA member Mobile. The Hornets got out to a quick lead that would never be relinquished as they dominated their lower-level foes throughout, en route to an 88–58 victory. The Hornets' next test was a road game against in-state foe Jacksonville State on November 16. The Hornets, who made 32 of 39 free throw attempts, were led by 16 points from Waters. The win increased Alabama State's record to 2–2, while dropping the Gamecocks to 0–4.

Alabama State returned home to the Dunn–Oliver Acadome on November 18 to take on the Cougars of Chicago State. The Cougars defeated the Hornets, 54–67, in Chicago in 2012. Alabama State hit several clutch free throws with 55 seconds left to hold off a 7–0 run by the Cougars to gain the win, 79–75, on the strength of DeMarcus Robinson's 24 points.

=== December ===
The Hornets visited nearby Troy, Alabama, on December 7 for their rivalry match-up with Troy. While Robinson added a team-high 19 points, Troy had three 16+ point scorers and rolled to an easy 85–69 victory, revenge for the Hornets' victory in Montgomery in 2012. Alabama State made a quick pit-stop at home on December 16 with a home date against Western Illinois before heading off to the Tulane Classic. Waters had 15 points and six assists to lead the Hornets to a 59–52 win.

== Roster ==
2013–14 Alabama State Hornets men's basketball team
Players
Coaches

Pos.	#	Name	Height	Weight	Year	Previous school	Hometown
C	0	Devonte Neal	6 ft 10 in (2.08 m)	220 lb (100 kg)	So	Ridgeway HS	Memphis, TN
F	2	Luther Page	6 ft 6 in (1.98 m)	190 lb (86 kg)	Jr	Father Gabriel HS	Ann Arbor, MI
G	3	DeMarcus Robinson	5 ft 10 in (1.78 m)	165 lb (75 kg)	Jr	Snead State CC	Midville, GA
F	4	Brandon Graham	6 ft 7 in (2.01 m)	195 lb (88 kg)	Jr	Snead State CC	Hampton, VA
G/F	5	Bobby Brown	6 ft 6 in (1.98 m)	185 lb (84 kg)	So	Lithia Springs HS	Douglasville, GA
G	11	Nick Davis	6 ft 5 in (1.96 m)	180 lb (82 kg)	Fr	McIntosh HS	McIntosh, AL
G	12	Jamel Waters	6 ft 9 in (2.06 m)	160 lb (73 kg)	So	Ramsay HS	Birmingham, AL
F	14	Tony Armstrong	6 ft 6 in (1.98 m)	185 lb (84 kg)	RS Fr	G. W. Carver HS	Montgomery, AL
F	15	Sean Burroughs	6 ft 7 in (2.01 m)	195 lb (88 kg)	Fr	Springfield HS	Springfield, OH
G/F	20	Billy Ingram	6 ft 6 in (1.98 m)	185 lb (84 kg)	RS Fr	Sumter Central HS	Bellamy, AL
G	21	DeAngelo Stewart	6 ft 4 in (1.93 m)	185 lb (84 kg)	Fr	Cass Technical HS	Detroit, MI
F	22	Maurice Strong	6 ft 5 in (1.96 m)	210 lb (95 kg)	Jr	Aiken Technical College	Swainsboro, GA
G	24	Darius Sizemore	6 ft 4 in (1.93 m)	205 lb (93 kg)	Fr	Mundy's Mill HS	Jonesboro, GA
F	25	Darius Scott	6 ft 5 in (1.96 m)	215 lb (98 kg)	So	Gillette College	Atlanta, GA
G	30	Terrance LeFlore	6 ft 1 in (1.85 m)	170 lb (77 kg)	Fr	Wetumpka HS	Wetumpka, AL
C	45	Robert Ojeah	6 ft 9 in (2.06 m)	245 lb (111 kg)	Jr	Aiken Technical College	Nigeria

Head coach

- Lewis Jackson (Alabama State)

Assistant coach(es)

- Anthony Sewell (Troy)
- Steve Rogers (Alabama State)
- Michael Curry (Alabama State)

Legend

- (C) Team captain
- (S) Suspended
- (I) Ineligible
- (W) Walk-on
- Injured
- Current redshirt

== Schedule and results ==
Date time, TV	Opponent	Result	Record	Site (attendance) city, state
Exhibition
10/31/2013*; 6:00 pm	Huntingdon	W 94–69		Dunn–Oliver Acadome (654); Montgomery, AL
11/5/2013*; 8:00 pm	Fort Valley State	W 79–71		Dunn–Oliver Acadome (N/A); Montgomery, AL
Non-conference games
11/8/2013*; 7:00 pm, ESPN3	at Illinois	L 63–80	0–1	State Farm Center (15,271); Champaign, IL
11/10/2013*; 4:00 pm	at Bradley	L 59–85	0–2	Carver Arena (3,820); Peoria, IL
11/13/2013*; 7:00 pm	Mobile	W 88–58	1–2	Dunn–Oliver Acadome (N/A); Montgomery, AL
11/16/2013*; 7:00 pm	at Jacksonville State	W 84–73	2–2	Pete Mathews Coliseum (986); Jacksonville, AL
11/18/2013*; 7:00 pm	Chicago State	W 79–75	3–2	Dunn–Oliver Acadome (874); Montgomery, AL
12/7/2013*; 1:00 pm	at Troy	L 69–85	3–3	Trojan Arena (1,265); Troy, AL
12/16/2013*; 7:00 pm	Western Illinois	W 59–52	4–3	Dunn–Oliver Acadome (236); Montgomery, AL
12/21/2013*; 3:00 pm	at Tulane; Tulane Classic	L 66–84	4–4	Devlin Fieldhouse (2,001); New Orleans, LA
12/22/2013*; 3:00 pm	vs. Milwaukee; Tulane Classic	L 54–67	4–5	Devlin Fieldhouse (2,111); New Orleans, LA
12/28/2013*; 4:00 pm	Auburn–Montgomery	W 78–51	5–5	Dunn–Oliver Acadome (264); Montgomery, AL
12/30/2013*; 7:00 pm	Thomas	W 93–68	6–5	Dunn–Oliver Acadome (N/A); Montgomery, AL
Conference games
1/4/2014; 7:30 pm	at Grambling State	W 68–51	7–5 (1–0)	Fredrick C. Hobdy Assembly Center (1,607); Grambling, LA
1/6/2014; 7:30 pm	at Jackson State	L 68–70	7–6 (1–1)	Williams Assembly Center (286); Jackson, MS
1/11/2014; 5:00 pm	Mississippi Valley State	W 93–62	8–6 (2–1)	Dunn–Oliver Acadome (576); Montgomery, AL
1/13/2014; 7:30 pm	Arkansas–Pine Bluff	W 77–64	9–6 (3–1)	Dunn–Oliver Acadome (N/A); Montgomery, AL
1/18/2014; 5:00 pm	Alabama A&M	W 67–58 ^{OT}	10–6 (4–1)	Dunn–Oliver Acadome (7,589); Montgomery, AL
1/25/2014; 7:30 pm	at Alcorn State	W 58–54	11–6 (5–1)	Davey Whitney Complex (N/A); Lorman, MS
1/27/2014; 7:30 pm	at Southern	L 55–68	11–7 (5–2)	F. G. Clark Center (1,438); Baton Rouge, LA
2/1/2014; 5:00 pm	Prairie View A&M	W 76–63	12–7 (6–2)	Dunn–Oliver Acadome (1,046); Montgomery, AL
2/3/2014; 7:30 pm	Texas Southern	W 79–73 ^{OT}	13–7 (7–2)	Dunn–Oliver Acadome (N/A); Montgomery, AL
2/8/2014; 7:30 pm	at Mississippi Valley State	W 75–70	14–7 (8–2)	Leflore County Civic Center (2,798); Greenwood, MS
2/10/2014; 7:30 pm	Arkansas–Pine Bluff	L 71–76	14–8 (8–3)	K. L. Johnson Complex (2,116); Pine Bluff, AR
2/15/2014; 5:00 pm	at Alabama A&M	L 65–68 ^{OT}	14–9 (8–4)	Elmore Gymnasium (3,510); Normal, AL
2/22/2014; 5:00 pm	Alcorn State	W 92–84	15–9 (9–4)	Dunn–Oliver Acadome (1,274); Montgomery, AL
2/24/2014; 7:30 pm	Southern	L 64–87	15–10 (9–5)	Dunn–Oliver Acadome (3,376); Montgomery, AL
3/1/2014; 7:30 pm	at Texas Southern	L 66–86	15–11 (9–6)	Health and Physical Education Arena (2,421); Houston, TX
3/3/2014; 7:30 pm	at Prairie View A&M	W 90–87 ^{OT}	16–11 (10–6)	William Nicks Building (1,458); Prairie View, TX
3/6/2014; 7:30 pm	Grambling State	W 68–66	17–11 (11–6)	Dunn–Oliver Acadome (1,736); Montgomery, AL
3/8/2014; 5:00 pm	Jackson State	W 67–63	18–11 (12–6)	Dunn–Oliver Acadome (2,346); Montgomery, AL
SWAC tournament
03/13/2014; 12:30 pm	vs. Alcorn State; Quarterfinals	W 64–51	19–11	Toyota Center (N/A); Houston, TX
03/14/2014; 2:30 pm	vs. Texas Southern; Semifinals	L 61–73	19–12	Toyota Center (N/A); Houston, TX
CIT
03/18/2014*; 7:00 pm	at Sam Houston State; First round	L 49–71	19–13	Bernard Johnson Coliseum (474); Huntsville, TX
*Non-conference game. ^{#}Rankings from AP Poll. (#) Tournament seedings in parentheses. All times are in Central.
