= Luther Riley =

American basketball coach

Luther J. Riley (born December 4, 1971) is an American basketball coach. He is the former head coach for Alcorn State University. Before being coach of Alcorn State, he was the coach John W. Provine High School where he won five state championships in eleven seasons.

== Personal life ==
Riley grew up in Walnut Grove, Mississippi. He graduated from South Leake High School and started college at East Central Community College obtaining an Associates degree. He earned a Bachelor of Science degree in health and physical education from Mississippi Valley State University in 1995 and a Master of Science degree in secondary education from Alcorn State University in 1998. , Masters from Mississippi College in 2015 in Administration, Specialist in Curriculum and Instruction and Doctorate in Educational Leadership from Mississippi College. He played college basketball at East Central under head coach Marty Cooper and Mississippi Valley under head coach Lafayette Stribling. Riley is a member of the 100 Black Men of Jackson and the Mississippi Association of Coaches. He is also a member of Omega Psi Phi, Inc.

[==Coaching career==

=== Early positions ===
Riley began coaching as an assistant at East Central Community College and as a volunteer assistant at Mississippi Valley State under Stribling. He then spent two seasons as a graduate assistant at Alcorn State under Davey Whitney.

=== Provine High School ===
In 2004, the Mississippi State Senate adopted a resolution commending Riley as All-Metro Coach of the Year and recognizing him as the youngest coach to win back-to-back state championships in Class 5A or 4A. after winning a resounding 6 state championships (one included as an overall state championship).

== John W. Provine High School ==
Riley was the coach of the John W. Provine High School Rams for eleven seasons and compiled a winning percentage of (.803) with an overall record of 286–70. He won five state championships and was named coach of the year five times.

== Alcorn State ==
On March 28, 2011, Riley was named the head coach at Alcorn State University where he amassed a 34–77 record in just under four full seasons. During the 2014–2015 season, Riley took a leave of absence "to evaluate some things". While some speculated that the leave of absence was due to a physical altercation with a player, Riley said those allegations were "completely false" and that he expected to return before the end of season. Riley never returned to Alcorn State and his contract expired without renewal in March 2015.

On April 14, 2017, Riley was arrested in Madison County, Mississippi and charged with a felony to defraud and cheat a former high school basketball player that he recruited while coaching at Alcorn State. According to court records, on or around June 13 of 2013, Riley admitted and pled guilty to willfully and intentionally cheating a recruit by making false pretenses about the tuition, room, and board costs at Alcorn State. Riley collected money from the recruit and claimed that the money would go towards the costs to attend Alcorn State and promised to use the money to hold his basketball scholarship. In reality, Riley kept the money for himself and did not honor the scholarship. Riley was ordered by the Madison County courts to pay $2,750 in restitution and serve one year of probation in exchange for pleading guilty.

== College Basketball Head coaching record ==
Record table
Season	Team	Overall	Conference	Standing	Postseason
Alcorn State Braves (Southwestern Athletic Conference) (2011–present)
2011–12	Alcorn State	10–22	6–12	7th	
2012–13	Alcorn State	10–24	8–10	T–5th	
2013–14	Alcorn State	12–19	9–9	6th	
2014–15	Alcorn State	6-26	4-14	9th	
Alcorn State:		38-91	27-45		
Total:		38-91			

== Columbus High School ==
Riley was announced as the head basketball coach at Columbus High School in May 2015. Led by Robert Woodard during the 2015–2016 season, Columbus compiled a 27–5 record and won the 6A state championship. After being named coach of the year, Riley did not sign the contract offered by the Columbus School District because he claimed the superintendent promised him a raise for winning a state championship. The superintendent, Dr. Philip W. V. Hickman, denied Riley's claims and said that all teachers are paid based on experience and "hired as a teacher".

== High School Administrative career ==
Riley was introduced as the principal at Bessemer City High School at a Bessemer City Board of Education work session on June 11, 2020. On June 16, 2020, his probationary contract offer was tabled by the board for undisclosed reasons.

In September 2020, Riley was hired as the assistant Principal at Holt High School within the Tuscaloosa County School System. He was promoted to principal of the school on June 7, 2021, but resigned on February 22, 2022, for undisclosed reasons.
