= 2013–14 Prairie View A&M Panthers basketball team =

American college basketball season

2013–14 Prairie View A&M Panthers basketball
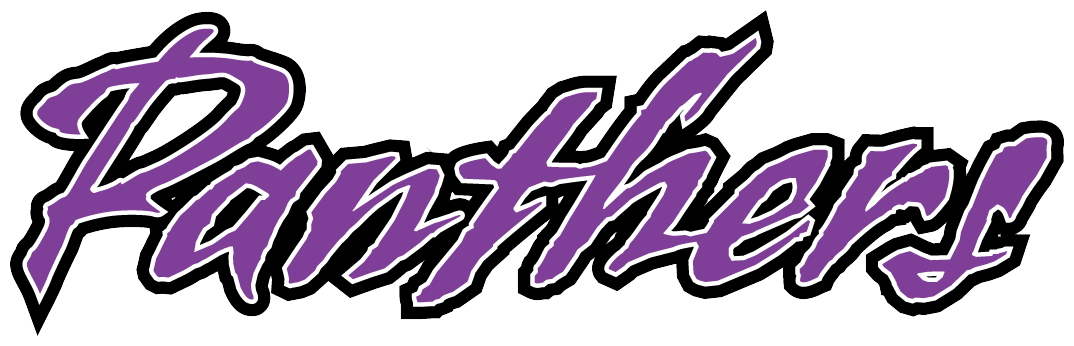
- Conference: Southwestern Athletic Conference
- Record: 11–23 (6–12 SWAC)
- Head coach: Byron Rimm II (8th season)
- Assistant coaches: Jethro Hillman (5th season); Ansar Al-Ameen (3rd season); Randy Washington (5th season)
- Home arena: William Nicks Building

2013–14 SWAC men's basketball standings
	Conf.				Overall
Team	W		L	PCT	W		L	PCT
Southern*	15	–	3	.833	19	–	13	.594
Texas Southern †	12	–	6	.667	19	–	15	.559
Alabama State	12	–	6	.667	19	–	13	.594
Arkansas–Pine Bluff*	11	–	7	.611	13	–	18	.419
Alabama A&M	10	–	8	.556	14	–	16	.467
Alcorn State**	9	–	9	.500	12	–	19	.387
Jackson State	7	–	11	.389	11	–	20	.355
Prairie View A&M	6	–	12	.333	11	–	23	.324
Mississippi Valley State*	5	–	13	.278	9	–	23	.281
Grambling State*	3	–	15	.167	5	–	24	.172
† 2014 SWAC tournament winner Rankings from AP poll *ineligible for postseason play due to APR penalties **Handed a L1 APR penalty, but eligible for postseason

The 2013–14 Prairie View A&M Panthers basketball team represented Prairie View A&M University during the 2013–14 NCAA Division I men's basketball season. The Panthers, led by eighth year head coach Byron Rimm II, played their home games at the William Nicks Building and were members of the Southwestern Athletic Conference. They finished the season 11–23, 6–12 in SWAC play to finish in eighth place. As the 8 seed, they won three games in four days to advance to the championship game of the SWAC tournament where they lost Texas Southern.

== Before the season ==
Prairie View A&M was picked to finish fourth in the SWAC pre-season polls.

== Roster ==
Number	Name	Position	Height	Weight	Year	Hometown
0	Andre Adams	Guard	5–9	180	Junior	Cypress, Texas
1	Rashaan Surles	Guard	6–6	180	Freshman	Flossmoor, Illinois
3	Louis Munks	Guard	6–3	200	Senior	Arlington, Texas
4	Babajidne Aina	Guard	6–2	180	Sophomore	Garland, Texas
5	Tre Hagood	Guard	6–2	174	Junior	Pensacola, Florida
11	Hershey Robinson	Forward	6–7	220	Junior	Benton, Louisiana
12	John Brisco	Guard	5–11		Junior	Longview, Texas
15	Patrick Agho	Forward	6–8	205	Senior	Houston, Texas
20	Jules Montgomery	Forward	6–11	220	Senior	West Hills, California
22	Rasi Jenkins	Forward	6–8	215	Senior	Brooklyn, New York
30	Karim York	Forward	6–8	215	Senior	Brooklyn, New York
31	Montrael Scott	Guard	6–3	195	Junior	Dallas, Texas
32	Demondre Chapman	Forward	6–7	220	Senior	Flint, Michigan
35	Reggis Onwukamuche	Center	6–9	225	Junior	Missouri City, Texas

== Schedule ==
Date time, TV	Opponent	Result	Record	Site (attendance) city, state
Regular season
11/08/2013*; 7:00 pm	at Mississippi State	L 56–71	0–1	Humphrey Coliseum (6,853); Starkville, MS
11/11/2013*; 7:00 pm	Schreiner	W 100–73	1–1	William Nicks Building (2,213); Prairie View, TX
11/14/2013*; 7:00 pm	Sam Houston State	L 103–108 ^{OT}	1–2	William Nicks Building (2,678); Prairie View, TX
11/19/2013*; 7:00 pm, FSSW/FCS Atlantic/ESPN3	at Texas A&M	L 65–75	1–3	Reed Arena (4,194); College Station, TX
11/25/2013*; 6:00 pm	at Colorado State; Colorado State Challenge	L 68–95	1–4	Moby Arena (2,718); Ft. Collins, CO
11/27/2013*; 6:00 pm	at New Mexico State; Colorado State Challenge	L 60–91	1–5	Pan American Center (4,804); Las Cruces, NM
11/29/2013*; 6:00 pm	vs. Bethune-Cookman; Colorado State Challenge	W 89–80	2–5	Butler–Hancock Sports Pavilion (102); Greeley, CO
12/01/2013*; 1:00 pm, Watch Big Sky	at Northern Colorado; Colorado State Challenge	L 70–87	2–6	Butler–Hancock Sports Pavilion (N/A); Greeley, CO
12/08/2013*; 6:00 pm	Dallas Christian			William Nicks Building; Prairie View, TX
12/11/2013*; 8:00 pm, BYUtv	at BYU	L 52–100	2–7	Marriott Center (15,194); Provo, UT
12/14/2013*; 7:00 pm, P12N	at UCLA	L 71–95	2–8	Pauley Pavilion (6,864); Los Angeles, CA
12/21/2013*; 2:00 pm	at Western Michigan	L 53–92	2–9	University Arena (3,142); Kalamazoo, MI
12/28/2013*; 1:00 pm, ESPNU	at No. 4 Wisconsin	L 43–80	2–10	Kohl Center (17,249); Madison, WI
01/04/2014; 5:00 pm	Southern	L 57–60	2–11 (0–1)	William Nicks Building (546); Prairie View, TX
01/06/2014; 7:30 pm	Alcorn State	W 70–67	3–11 (1–1)	William Nicks Building (409); Prairie View, TX
01/11/2014; 7:30 pm	at Texas Southern	L 83–87 ^{3OT}	3–12 (1–2)	Health and Physical Education Arena (6,482); Houston, TX
01/18/2014; 5:30 pm	at Jackson State	W 85–80 ^{2OT}	4–12 (2–2)	Williams Assembly Center (1,111); Jackson, MS
01/20/2014; 5:00 pm	at Grambling State	W 83–82	5–12 (3–2)	Fredrick C. Hobdy Assembly Center (1,716); Grambling, LA
01/25/2014; 5:00 pm	Mississippi Valley State	W 71–62	6–12 (4–2)	William Nicks Building (1,275); Prairie View, TX
01/27/2014; 7:30 pm	Arkansas–Pine Bluff	L 72–81	6–13 (4–3)	William Nicks Building (2,115); Prairie View, TX
02/01/2014; 5:00 pm	at Alabama State	L 63–76	6–14 (4–4)	Dunn–Oliver Acadome (1,046); Montgomery, AL
02/03/2013; 7:30 pm	at Alabama A&M	L 55–67	6–15 (4–5)	Elmore Gymnasium (1,483); Normal, AL
02/08/2014; 7:00 pm	Texas Southern	W 85–77	7–15 (5–5)	William Nicks Building (3,980); Prairie View, TX
02/15/2014; 5:00 pm	Jackson State	W 53–50	8–15 (6–5)	William Nicks Building (1,108); Prairie View, TX
02/17/2014; 7:30 pm	Grambling State	L 81–83	8–16 (6–6)	William Nicks Building (1,995); Prairie View, TX
02/22/2014; 7:30 pm	at Arkansas–Pine Bluff	L 61–76	8–17 (6–7)	K. L. Johnson Complex (4,126); Pine Bluff, AR
02/24/2014; 8:00 pm	at Mississippi Valley State	L 69–75	8–18 (6–8)	Leflore County Civic Center (1,237); Greenwood, MS
03/01/2014; 5:00 pm	Alabama A&M	L 65–72	8–19 (6–9)	William Nicks Building (1,245); Prairie View, TX
03/03/2014; 7:30 pm	Alabama State	L 87–90 ^{OT}	8–20 (6–10)	William Nicks Building (1,458); Prairie View, TX
03/06/2014; 7:30 pm	at Southern	L 59–91	8–21 (6–11)	F. G. Clark Center (1,244); Baton Rouge, LA
03/08/2014; 5:00 pm	at Alcorn State	L 62–64	8–22 (6–12)	Davey Whitney Complex (N/A); Lorman, MS
SWAC tournament
03/11/2014; 8:00 pm	vs. Mississippi Valley State; First round	W 79–63	9–22	Toyota Center (2,000); Houston, TX
03/12/2014; 8:00 pm	vs. Southern; Quarterfinals	W 64–46	10–22	Toyota Center (3,624); Houston, TX
03/14/2014; 8:30 pm	vs. Alabama A&M; Semifinals	W 55–49	11–22	Toyota Center (N/A); Houston, TX
03/15/2014; 3:30 pm, ESPN2	vs. Texas Southern; Championship	L 73–78	11–23	Toyota Center (8,058); Houston, TX
*Non-conference game. ^{#}Rankings from AP Poll. (#) Tournament seedings in parentheses. All times are in Central Time.

* The December 8 matchup with Dallas Christian was cancelled due to inclement weather in the North Texas area.
