= 2013–14 Jackson State Tigers basketball team =

American college basketball season

2013–14 Jackson State Tigers men's basketball
- Conference: Southwestern Athletic Conference
- Record: 11–20 (7–11 SWAC)
- Head coach: Wayne Brent (1st season)
- Assistant coaches: Hennssy Auriantal; Cason Burk
- Home arena: Williams Assembly Center

2013–14 SWAC men's basketball standings
	Conf.				Overall
Team	W		L	PCT	W		L	PCT
Southern*	15	–	3	.833	19	–	13	.594
Texas Southern †	12	–	6	.667	19	–	15	.559
Alabama State	12	–	6	.667	19	–	13	.594
Arkansas–Pine Bluff*	11	–	7	.611	13	–	18	.419
Alabama A&M	10	–	8	.556	14	–	16	.467
Alcorn State**	9	–	9	.500	12	–	19	.387
Jackson State	7	–	11	.389	11	–	20	.355
Prairie View A&M	6	–	12	.333	11	–	23	.324
Mississippi Valley State*	5	–	13	.278	9	–	23	.281
Grambling State*	3	–	15	.167	5	–	24	.172
† 2014 SWAC tournament winner Rankings from AP poll *ineligible for postseason play due to APR penalties **Handed a L1 APR penalty, but eligible for postseason

The 2013–14 Jackson State Tigers basketball team represented Jackson State University during the 2013–14 NCAA Division I men's basketball season. The Tigers, led by first year head coach Wayne Brent, played their home games at the Williams Assembly Center and were members of the Southwestern Athletic Conference. They finished the season 11–20, 7–11 in SWAC play to finish in seventh place. They lost in the first round of the SWAC tournament to Grambling State.

== Roster ==
Number	Name	Position	Height	Weight	Year	Hometown
2	Derrell Taylor	Small forward	6–6	200	Junior	Morton, Mississippi
3	Chester Victor	Small forward	6–2	160	Freshman	Reserve, Louisiana
4	Jeff Stubbs	Guard	6–1	170	Senior	Jackson, Mississippi
5	Rasheed James	Guard	6–1	180	Freshman	Zachary, Louisiana
10	O'Barcus Taylor	Guard	6–2	195	Freshman	Jackson, Mississippi
11	Marcus Love	Guard	6–2	175	Freshman	Jackson, Mississippi
20	Javeres Brent	Guard	6–3	195	Freshman	Jackson, Mississippi
21	Kenneth Wachira	Forward	6–7	195	Freshman	Kenya
22	Treshawn Jackson	Forward	6–8	235	Freshman	Jackson, Mississippi
23	Julysses Nobles	Guard	6–1	200	Senior	Jackson, Mississippi
24	Marquis Todd	Forward	6–9	220	Freshman	Chicago, Illinois
31	Dontaveon Robinson	Guard	6–4	180	Freshman	Jackson, Mississippi
33	Kenneth Taylor	Guard	6–3	185	Freshman	Freeport, Bahamas
34	Brandon West	Center	6–10	235	Graduate	Cheneyville, Louisiana
35	Janarius Middleton	Forward	6–8	215	Freshman	Greenwood, Mississippi

== Schedule ==
Date time, TV	Opponent	Result	Record	Site (attendance) city, state
Exhibition
11/05/2013*; 7:30 pm	Tougaloo	W 89–42	–	Williams Assembly Center (N/A); Jackson, Mississippi
Regular season
11/08/2013*; 7:30 pm	at Southern Miss	L 51–67	0–1	Reed Green Coliseum (4,967); Hattiesburg, Mississippi
11/11/2013*; 7:30 pm	Arkansas State; Global Sports Shootout	L 61–65	0–2	Williams Assembly Center (998); Jackson, Mississippi
11/14/2013*; 7:00 pm	at Air Force	W 84–82	1–2	Clune Arena (1,588); Colorado Springs, Colorado
11/16/2013*; 10:00 am	at Colorado; Global Sports Shootout	L 70–94	1–3	Coors Events Center (9,042); Boulder, Colorado
11/18/2013*; 7:30 pm	at Wyoming; Global Sports Shootout	L 65–73	1–4	Arena-Auditorium (4,099); Laramie, Wyoming
11/22/2013*; 7:00 pm	at Tennessee–Martin; Global Sports Shootout	W 68–64	2–4	Skyhawk Arena (1,604); Martin, Tennessee
11/27/2013*; 1:00 pm	at Mississippi State	L 56–58	2–5	Humphrey Coliseum (6,776); Starkville, Mississippi
12/01/2013*; 7:30 pm	Louisiana Tech	L 61–72	2–6	Williams Assembly Center (608); Jackson, Mississippi
12/07/2013*; 2:00 pm	at Tulane	L 65–70	2–7	Devlin Fieldhouse (1,462); New Orleans
12/14/2013*; 2:05 pm	at Evansville	W 57–51	3–7	Ford Center (4,097); Evansville, Indiana
12/19/2013*; 7:30 pm	Louisiana–Lafayette	W 73–70	4–7	Williams Assembly Center (891); Jackson, Mississippi
12/28/2013*; 11:00 am, ESPNU	at No. 17 Memphis	L 61–75	4–8	FedExForum (15,797); Memphis, Tennessee
01/04/2014; 5:30 pm	Alabama A&M	L 61–68	4–9 (0–1)	Williams Assembly Center (877); Jackson, Mississippi
01/06/2014; 7:30 pm	Alabama State	W 70–68	5–9 (1–1)	Williams Assembly Center (286); Jackson, Mississippi
01/11/2014; 5:30 pm	at Alcorn State	L 51–64	5–10 (1–2)	Davey Whitney Complex (2,509); Lorman, Mississippi
01/13/2014; 7:30 pm	at Southern	L 36–60	5–11 (1–3)	F.G. Clark Center (2,140); Baton Rouge, Louisiana
01/18/2014; 5:30 pm	Prairie View A&M	L 80–85 ^{2OT}	5–12 (1–4)	Williams Assembly Center (1,111); Jackson, Mississippi
01/20/2014; 7:30 pm	Texas Southern	W 84–80	6–12 (2–4)	Williams Assembly Center (932); Jackson, Mississippi
01/25/2014; 7:30 pm	Grambling State	W 76–59	7–12 (3–4)	Williams Assembly Center (1,003); Jackson, Mississippi
02/01/2014; 5:30 pm	at Mississippi Valley State	L 66–69	7–13 (3–5)	Leflore County Civic Center (3,402); Greenwood, Mississippi
02/03/2014; 7:30 pm	at Arkansas–Pine Bluff	L 69–70	7–14 (3–6)	K. L. Johnson Complex (3,890); Pine Bluff, Arkansas
02/08/2014; 5:30 pm	Alcorn State	W 71–61	8–14 (4–6)	Williams Assembly Center (2,240); Jackson, Mississippi
02/10/2014; 7:30 pm	Southern	L 63–68	8–15 (4–7)	Williams Assembly Center (1,025); Jackson, Mississippi
02/15/2014; 7:30 pm	at Prairie View A&M	L 50–53	8–16 (4–8)	William Nicks Building (1,108); Prairie View, Texas
02/17/2014; 7:30 pm	at Texas Southern	W 75–73	9–16 (5–8)	Health and Physical Education Arena (2,142); Houston, Texas
02/22/2014; 5:30 pm	at Grambling State	W 79–59	10–16 (6–8)	Fredrick C. Hobdy Assembly Center (2,756); Grambling, Louisiana
03/01/2014; 5:30 pm	Mississippi Valley State	W 82–64	11–16 (7–8)	Williams Assembly Center (1,584); Jackson, Mississippi
03/03/2014; 7:30 pm	Arkansas–Pine Bluff	L 59–66	11–17 (7–9)	Williams Assembly Center (642); Jackson, Mississippi
03/06/2014; 7:30 pm	at Alabama A&M	L 59–72	11–18 (7–10)	Elmore Gymnasium (1,408); Huntsville, Alabama
03/08/2014; 5:30 pm	at Alabama State	L 63–67	11–19 (7–11)	Dunn–Oliver Acadome (2,346); Montgomery, Alabama
2014 SWAC tournament
03/11/2014; 12:30 pm	vs. Grambling State; First round	L 75–84	11–20	Toyota Center (N/A); Houston, Texas
*Non-conference game. ^{#}Rankings from AP Poll. (#) Tournament seedings in parentheses. All times are in Central Time.
