= Ethan Wragge =

American basketball player

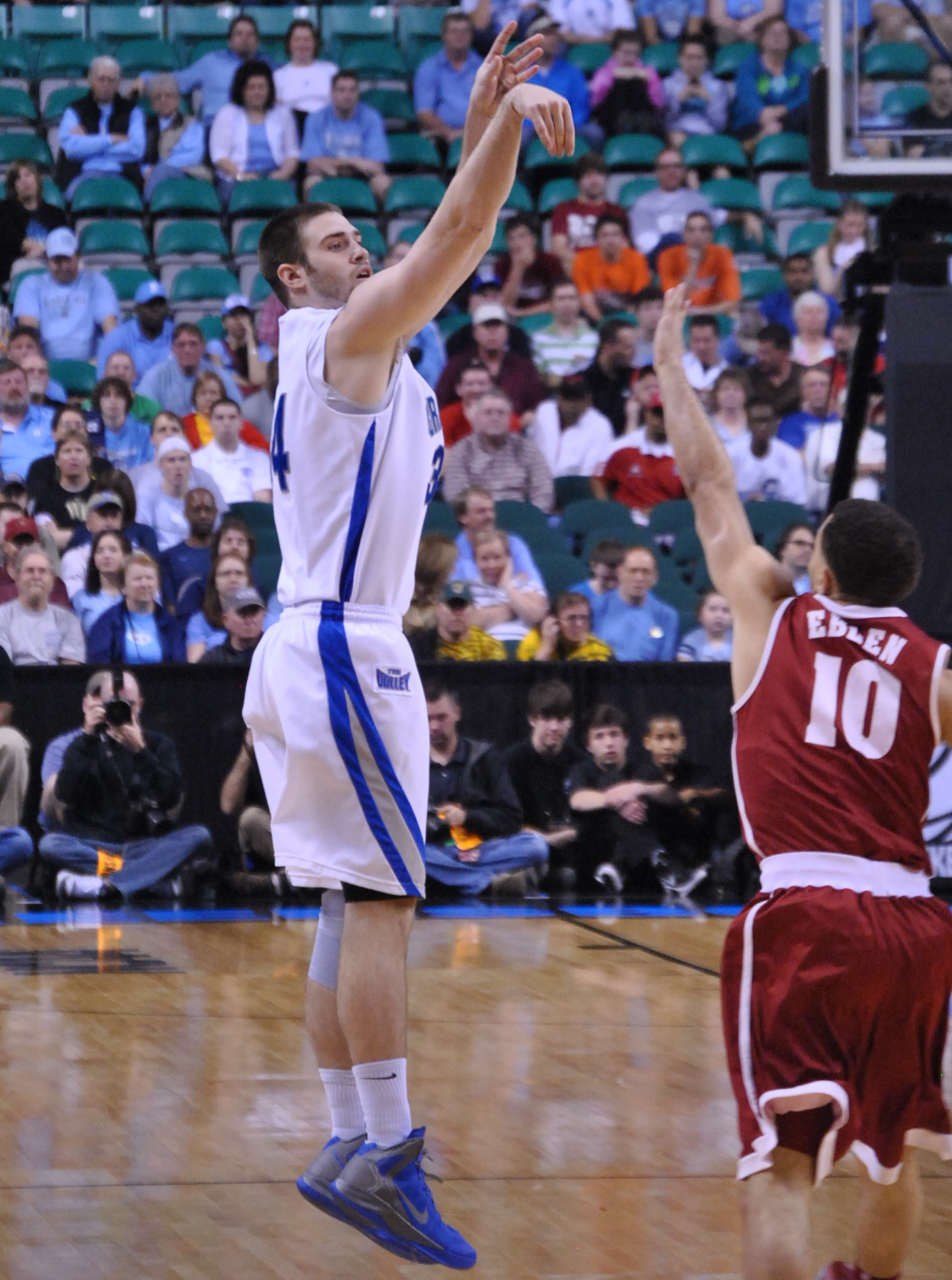

Personal information
- Born: October 1, 1990 (age 36) Sandusky, Ohio, U.S.
- Listed height: 6 ft 7 in (2.01 m)
- Listed weight: 225 lb (102 kg)

Career information
- High school: Eden Prairie (Eden Prairie, Minnesota)
- College: Creighton (2009–2014)
- NBA draft: 2014: undrafted
- Playing career: 2014–2016
- Position: Small forward

Career history
- 2014–2015: Dominion Bilbao
- 2015–2016: Gießen 46ers

Ethan Donald Wragge (born October 1, 1990) is an American former basketball player who last played for the Gießen 46ers of Germany's Basketball Bundesliga. Wragge played college basketball at Creighton University.

Wragge, a 6'7" small forward from Eden Prairie, Minnesota, played for Creighton from 2009 to 2014. For most of his time there he played with All-American Doug McDermott. As a senior, Wragge was one of the top three-point shooters in the NCAA, finishing the season at 47% from three, good for fifth in the country.

Following his graduation from Creighton, Wragge went undrafted in the 2014 NBA draft. He signed with Bilbao Basket in Spain's top league. After spending one season with them, he signed with the Giessen 46ers in Germany's Basketball Bundesliga.

== See also ==
- List of NCAA Division I men's basketball players with 145 games played
