= Bhullar =

Bhullar may refer to:

- Villages in Punjab state, India:
  - Bhullar, Kapurthala
  - Bhullar, Jalandhar
  - Bhullar, Gurdaspur
- Bhullar (name), surname, including a list of people with the name
- Bhullar v Bhullar, 2003 UK company law case

== See also ==
- Calgary-Bhullar-McCall, provincial electoral district for the Legislative Assembly of Alberta, Canada
- Death sentence of Devinder Pal Singh Bhullar
- Bhullarai, village in Tehsil Phagwara, Kapurthala district, Punjab state, India
