= 2013–14 Texas–Pan American Broncs men's basketball team =

American college basketball season

2013–14 Texas–Pan American Broncs men's basketball
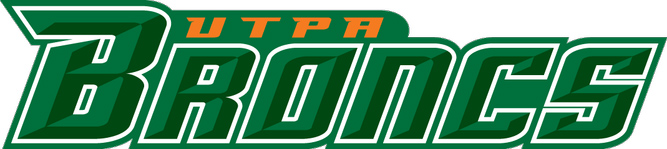
- Conference: Western Athletic Conference
- Record: 9–23 (5–11 WAC)
- Head coach: Dan Hipsher (1st season)
- Assistant coaches: Andy Hipsher (1st season); Elwyn McRoy (1st season); Cody Hopkins (1st season)
- Home arena: UTPA Fieldhouse

2013–14 WAC men's basketball standings
	Conf.				Overall
Team	W		L	PCT	W		L	PCT
Utah Valley	13	–	3	.813	20	–	12	.625
New Mexico State †	12	–	4	.750	26	–	10	.722
Grand Canyon *	10	–	6	.625	15	–	15	.500
Chicago State	8	–	8	.500	13	–	19	.406
UMKC	7	–	9	.438	10	–	20	.333
Idaho	7	–	9	.438	16	–	17	.485
Cal State Bakersfield	5	–	11	.313	13	–	19	.406
Seattle	5	–	11	.313	13	–	17	.433
Texas–Pan American	5	–	11	.313	9	–	23	.281
† 2014 WAC tournament winner Rankings from AP poll * ineligible for postseason tournament as part of reclassification from NCAA Division II

The 2013–14 Texas–Pan American Broncs men's basketball team represented the University of Texas–Pan American during the 2013–14 NCAA Division I men's basketball season. This was head coach Dan Hipsher's first season at UTPA. The Broncs played their home games at the UTPA Fieldhouse and were new members of the Western Athletic Conference. They finished the season 9–23, 5–11 in WAC play to finish in a three way tie for seventh place. They lost in the quarterfinals of the WAC tournament to Utah Valley.

== Roster ==
2013–14 UTPA Broncs men's basketball team
Players
Coaches

Pos.	#	Name	Height	Weight	Year	Previous school	Hometown
G	0	Jacob Raspopovich	6 ft 1 in (1.85 m)	175 lb (79 kg)	Fr	Merrillville	Merrillville, IN
G	1	Blake Provost	5 ft 10 in (1.78 m)	170 lb (77 kg)	RS Fr	Katy Taylor	Katy, TX
G	2	LJ McIntosh	6 ft 1 in (1.85 m)	165 lb (75 kg)	Fr	Marist	Chicago, IL
G/F	3	Javorn Farrell	6 ft 5 in (1.96 m)	215 lb (98 kg)	RS Sr	Riverdale Baptist; UMass Amherst	Woodbridge, VA
G	4	Jamal Dantzler	6 ft 3 in (1.91 m)	190 lb (86 kg)	Sr	Von Stuben; Kennedy-King	Chicago, IL
G	5	Shaquile Boga	5 ft 11 in (1.8 m)	170 lb (77 kg)	Jr	McCluer; Mineral Area	St. Louis, MO
F	21	Lauri Toivonen	6 ft 7 in (2.01 m)	215 lb (98 kg)	Jr	Makelanrinne; Ohlone JC	Riihimäki, Finland
G	22	Shaun Noriega	6 ft 4 in (1.93 m)	207 lb (94 kg)	RS Sr	North Port; South Florida	Sarasota, FL
G	23	Elijah Watson	6 ft 2 in (1.88 m)	185 lb (84 kg)	Fr	St. Patrick	Chicago, IL
F	24	Shaquille Hines	6 ft 7 in (2.01 m)	195 lb (88 kg)	So	Harlan; Trent Prep High	Chicago, IL
F	25	Josh Cleveland	6 ft 6 in (1.98 m)	225 lb (102 kg)	Sr	Elsik	Houston, TX
G	30	Hurley Johnson	6 ft 1 in (1.85 m)	185 lb (84 kg)	Sr	Woods Haven Prep; Colby	Clewiston, FL
F	32	Justin Leathers	6 ft 5 in (1.96 m)	215 lb (98 kg)	Sr	Park Hill; Johnson County	Kansas City, MO
G	33	Marcel Simon	6 ft 5 in (1.96 m)	198 lb (90 kg)	Fr	Hidelberg; Fishburne Military	Heidelberg, Germany
F	35	Alex Majewski	6 ft 7 in (2.01 m)	205 lb (93 kg)	Fr	Brother Rice	Chicago, IL
G	44	Christian Hildebrandt	6 ft 4 in (1.93 m)	190 lb (86 kg)	Jr	Park Hill South; Johnson County CC	Overland Park, KS
G	XX	Justin Daniel (redshirt)	6 ft 3 in (1.91 m)	195 lb (88 kg)	So	Woodrow Wilson; Coastal Carolina	Ft. Worth, TX
G	XX	Paul Garnica (redshirt)	5 ft 11 in (1.8 m)	170 lb (77 kg)	Sr	Robert E. Lee; Northern Colorado	San Antonio, TX
G	XX	Moe McDonald (redshirt)	6 ft 4 in (1.93 m)	185 lb (84 kg)	Fr	IMG Academy	McAllen, TX

Head coach

- Dan Hipsher (Bowling Green)

Assistant coach(es)

- Andy Hipsher (Akron)
- Elwyn McRoy (Cleveland State)
- Cody Hopkins (Northeastern State)

Legend

- (C) Team captain
- (S) Suspended
- (I) Ineligible
- (W) Walk-on
- Injured
- Current redshirt

== Schedule and results ==
Date time, TV	Opponent	Result	Record	Site (attendance) city, state
Exhibition
11/02/2013*; 7:00 pm	Texas A&M–Kingsville	W 74–56	–	UTPA Fieldhouse (344); Edinburg, TX
Regular season
11/08/2013*; 7:00 pm	Sam Houston State	L 73–77	0–1	UTPA Fieldhouse (1,257); Edinburg, TX
11/11/2013*; 7:00 pm	Houston	L 65–77	0–2	UTPA Fieldhouse (1,432); Edinburg, TX
11/13/2013*; 6:00 pm	Hustin-Tilliotson; Islander Classic	W 94–62	1–2	UTPA Fieldhouse (471); Edinburg, TX
11/15/2013*; 5:00 pm	vs. Tennessee Tech; Islander Classic	W 81–78	2–2	American Bank Center (N/A); Corpus Christi, TX
11/16/2013*; 3:00 pm	vs. IPFW; Islander Classic	L 60–66	2–3	American Bank Center (N/A); Corpus Christi, TX
11/17/2013*; 3:30 pm	at Texas A&M–Corpus Christi; Islander Classic	L 61–72	2–4	American Bank Center (1,228); Corpus Christi, TX
11/21/2013*; 7:00 pm	at UTSA	W 70–55	3–4	Convocation Center (777); San Antonio, TX
11/27/2013*; 7:00 pm	at Lamar	W 66–61	4–4	Montagne Center (1,784); Beaumont, TX
11/30/2013*; 7:00 pm	at Bradley	L 54–74	4–5	Carver Arena (5,898); Peoria, IL
12/02/2013*; 7:00 pm	at SIU Edwardsville	L 49–55	4–6	Vadalabene Center (1,230); Edwardsville, IN
12/07/2013*; 7:00 pm	UTSA	L 65–72	4–7	UTPA Fieldhouse (1,487); Edinburg, TX
12/15/2013*; 1:00 pm, FSSW	at TCU	L 48–57	4–8	Daniel-Meyer Coliseum (3,958); Fort Worth, TX
12/18/2013*; 7:30 pm, ESPN3	at SMU	L 56–82	4–9	Moody Coliseum (3,342); University Park, TX
12/29/2013*; 2:00 pm	Duquesne	L 69–88	4–10	UTPA Fieldhouse (702); Edinburg, TX
01/02/2014; 8:00 pm	at Grand Canyon	L 85–91	4–11 (0–1)	GCU Arena (4,512); Phoenix, AZ
01/04/2013*; 3:00 pm, FSSW	at Texas A&M	L 46–63	4–12	Reed Arena (5,278); College Station, TX
01/09/2014; 7:00 pm	Idaho	L 85–86 ^{2OT}	4–13 (0–2)	UTPA Fieldhouse (624); Edinburg, TX
01/11/2014; 7:00 pm	Seattle	L 46–64	4–14 (0–3)	UTPA Fieldhouse (889); Edinburg, TX
01/16/2014; 7:00 pm	at UMKC	W 78–66	5–14 (1–3)	Municipal Auditorium (1,509); Kansas City, MO
01/18/2014; 2:05 pm	at Chicago State	W 84–61	6–14 (2–3)	Emil and Patricia Jones Convocation Center (880); Chicago, IL
01/25/2014; 8:00 pm, AggieVision	at New Mexico State	L 78–90	6–15 (2–4)	Pan American Center (6,434); Las Cruces, NM
01/30/2014; 7:00 pm	Utah Valley	L 53–67	6–16 (2–5)	UTPA Fieldhouse (1,263); Edinburg, TX
02/01/2014; 7:00 pm	Cal State Bakersfield	L 64–72	6–17 (2–6)	UTPA Fieldhouse (792); Edinburg, TX
02/06/2014; 9:00 pm	at Seattle	L 62–83	6–18 (2–7)	KeyArena (1,663); Seattle, WA
02/08/2014; 9:00 pm	at Idaho	L 63–70 ^{OT}	6–19 (2–8)	Cowan Spectrum (1,717); Moscow, ID
02/13/2014; 7:00 pm	Chicago State	W 71–68 ^{OT}	7–19 (3–8)	UTPA Fieldhouse (1,276); Edinburg, TX
02/15/2014; 7:00 pm	UMKC	L 59–68	8–19 (4–8)	UTPA Fieldhouse (1,302); Edinburg, TX
02/20/2014; 7:00 pm	New Mexico State	L 61–78	8–20 (4–9)	UTPA Fieldhouse (1,002); Edinburg, TX
02/27/2014; 9:00 pm	at Cal State Bakersfield	W 63–61	9–20 (5–9)	Rabobank Arena (1,244); Bakersfield, CA
03/01/2014; 8:00 pm	at Utah Valley	L 42–45	9–21 (5–10)	UCCU Center (2,641); Orem, UT
03/08/2014; 7:00 pm	Grand Canyon	L 78–79 ^{OT}	9–22 (5–11)	UTPA Fieldhouse (1,187); Edinburg, TX
WAC tournament
03/13/2014; 2:00 pm	vs. Utah Valley; Quarterfinals	L 63–83	9–23	Orleans Arena (1,028); Paradise, NV
*Non-conference game. ^{#}Rankings from AP Poll. (#) Tournament seedings in parentheses. All times are in Central.
