= Bhullar (name) =

Bhullar is a surname of various South Asian and Southeast Asian communities. Notable people with the surname include:

- Arjan Bhullar (born 1986), Indo-Canadian mixed martial artist
- Gaganjeet Bhullar (born 1988), Indian professional golfer
- Gurbachan Singh Bhullar (born 1937), Punjabi author
- Gurnam Bhullar (born 1994), Indian singer, actor and lyricist
- Harmanpreet Kaur, or Harmanpreet Kaur Bhullar (born 1989), Indian cricketer
- Jasmine Bhullar, or ThatBronzeGirl, American actress, writer, streamer, and gamemaster
- Laljit Singh Bhullar, Indian politician
- Manmeet Bhullar (1980–2015), Canadian politician
- Mehal Singh Bhullar, retired Indian Police Service officer and director general of Punjab Police from 2002 to 2003
- Melinder Bhullar (born 1992), Malaysian model and beauty pageant titleholder
- Ranbir Bhullar, Indian politician
- Sim Bhullar (born 1992), Canadian professional basketball player
- Sukhpal Singh Bhullar (born 1978), Indian politician
- Sukshinder Shinda (born Sukshinder Singh Bhullar), British Indian singer-songwriter and record producer
- Tony Bhullar, Canadian politician
