= 2013–14 Western Athletic Conference men's basketball season =

- League: NCAA Division I
- Sport: Basketball

2013–14 NCAA Division I men's basketball season
- Regular season champions: Utah Valley
- Runners-up: New Mexico State; Grand Canyon
- Season MVP: Daniel Mullings

Tournament
- Champions: New Mexico State
- Runners-up: Idaho
- Finals MVP: Sim Bhullar

Basketball seasons
- ← 2012–13 2014–15 →

2013–14 WAC men's basketball standings
	Conf.				Overall
Team	W		L	PCT	W		L	PCT
Utah Valley	13	–	3	.813	20	–	12	.625
New Mexico State †	12	–	4	.750	26	–	10	.722
Grand Canyon *	10	–	6	.625	15	–	15	.500
Chicago State	8	–	8	.500	13	–	19	.406
UMKC	7	–	9	.438	10	–	20	.333
Idaho	7	–	9	.438	16	–	17	.485
Cal State Bakersfield	5	–	11	.313	13	–	19	.406
Seattle	5	–	11	.313	13	–	17	.433
Texas–Pan American	5	–	11	.313	9	–	23	.281
† 2014 WAC tournament winner Rankings from AP poll * ineligible for postseason tournament as part of reclassification from NCAA Division II

The 2013–14 Western Athletic Conference men's basketball season began with practices in October 2013, which was followed by the beginning of the 2013–14 NCAA Division I men's basketball season in November. The regular season title was won by the Utah Valley Wolverines, who fell to Idaho in the first round of the conference tournament. New Mexico State was crowned the conference champions for their third straight season after a 77-55 win over the Vandals.

Following the regular season, 10 teams participated in the 2013 WAC men's basketball tournament, with the champions, New Mexico State being the only team to advance to the 2014 NCAA Men's Division I Basketball Tournament; two teams participated in the 2014 National Invitation Tournament.

Daniel Mullings of New Mexico State was named conference player of the year for the regular season, whereas the Aggies' center Sim Bhullar was named the tournament's Most Outstanding Player.

== Conference games ==
=== Composite Matrix ===
This table summarizes the head-to-head results between teams in conference play. (x) indicates games remaining this season.

	CS Bakersfield	Chicago St.	Grand Canyon	Idaho	NM St.	Seattle	UTPA	UMKC	Utah Valley
vs. Cal State Bakersfield	-	0-2	0-2	1–1	0-2	2-0	1-1	1-1	0-2
vs. Chicago State	2-0	-	0–2	1-1	1-1	2-0	0–2	2-0	0–2
vs. Grand Canyon	2-0	2–0	-	0-2	2–0	2–0	1-1	1–1	0-2
vs. Idaho	1–1	1-1	1–1	-	1–1	0-2	2–0	1–1	0-2
vs. New Mexico State	2-0	1-1	2-0	1–1	-	2-0	2–0	1-1	1-1
vs. Seattle	0-2	0-2	0–2	2-0	0-2	-	2–0	0-2	1-1
vs. Texas - Pan American	1-1	2–0	0–2	0–2	0–2	0–2	-	2-0	0-2
vs. UMKC	1-1	0-2	1–1	1–1	1-1	2-0	0-2	-	1-1
vs. Utah Valley	2–0	2–0	2-0	2-0	1-1	1-1	2-0	1-1	-
Total	5-11	8-8	10-6	7-9	12-4	5-11	5–11	7-9	13-3

== WAC tournament ==
Quarterfinals; Thursday, March 13
1	Utah Valley	83
8	Texas–Pan American	63
4	UMKC	70
5	Idaho	73
2	New Mexico State	70
7	Seattle	68
3	Chicago State	62
6	Cal State Bakersfield	67

Semifinals; Friday, March 14
1	Utah Valley	69
5	Idaho	74
2	New Mexico State	69
6	Cal State Bakersfield	63

Championship; Saturday, March 15; ESPNU
5	Idaho	55
2	New Mexico State	77
