= 2013–14 Grand Canyon Antelopes men's basketball team =

American college basketball season

2013–14 Grand Canyon Antelopes men's basketball
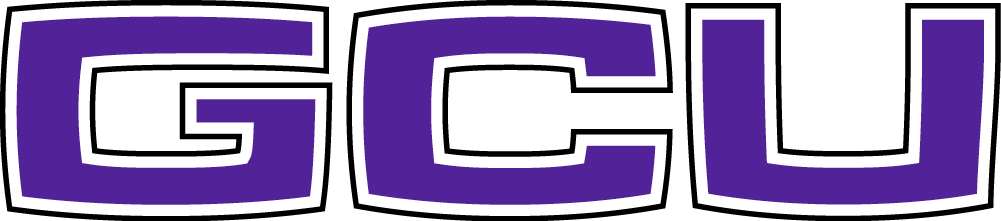

CIT, First round
- Conference: Western Athletic Conference
- Record: 15–15 (10–6 WAC)
- Head coach: Dan Majerle (1st season)
- Assistant coaches: Todd Lee; Mark Nelson; Chris Crevelone
- Home arena: GCU Arena

2013–14 WAC men's basketball standings
	Conf.				Overall
Team	W		L	PCT	W		L	PCT
Utah Valley	13	–	3	.813	20	–	12	.625
New Mexico State †	12	–	4	.750	26	–	10	.722
Grand Canyon *	10	–	6	.625	15	–	15	.500
Chicago State	8	–	8	.500	13	–	19	.406
UMKC	7	–	9	.438	10	–	20	.333
Idaho	7	–	9	.438	16	–	17	.485
Cal State Bakersfield	5	–	11	.313	13	–	19	.406
Seattle	5	–	11	.313	13	–	17	.433
Texas–Pan American	5	–	11	.313	9	–	23	.281
† 2014 WAC tournament winner Rankings from AP poll * ineligible for postseason tournament as part of reclassification from NCAA Division II

The 2013–14 Grand Canyon Antelopes men's basketball team represented Grand Canyon University during the 2013–14 college basketball season. This was head coach Dan Majerle's first season at Grand Canyon. The Antelopes competed in the Western Athletic Conference and played their home games at GCU Arena, with one postseason game at Antelope Gymnasium. This season was year 1 of a 4-year transition period from Division II to Division I. As a result, the Antelopes were not eligible to participate in the NCAA Tournament and did not participate WAC Basketball Tournament. However, the Antelopes could have competed in the NIT, CIT, or CBI tournaments, should they be invited. They finished the season 15–15, 10–6 in WAC play, to finish in third place. They were invited to the CollegeInsider.com Tournament, where they lost in the first round to Pacific.

== Roster ==
2013–14 Grand Canyon Antelopes men's basketball team
Players
Coaches

Pos.	#	Name	Height	Weight	Year	Previous school	Hometown
G	1	Demetrius Walker	6 ft 2 in (1.88 m)	190 lb (86 kg)	RS Sr	St. Mary's; New Mexico	Fontana, CA
G	2	Jeff Lowery	6 ft 1 in (1.85 m)	195 lb (88 kg)	So	Desert Vista	Phoenix, AZ
G	3	Sam Daly	6 ft 3 in (1.91 m)	175 lb (79 kg)	Fr	Unley	Adelaide, Australia
G	4	Ryan Majerle	6 ft 3 in (1.91 m)	190 lb (86 kg)	Jr	Rockford; Grand Valley State; Toledo	Rockford, MI
G	5	Justin Foreman	6 ft 6 in (1.98 m)	192 lb (87 kg)	Jr	Westbury Christian	Houston, TX
F	10	Jevon Estelle	6 ft 3 in (1.91 m)	210 lb (95 kg)	So	Winslow	Winslow, AZ
F	12	Daniel Alexander	6 ft 9 in (2.06 m)	217 lb (98 kg)	Jr	Dripping Springs; Texas A&M	Austin, TX
G	14	Akachi Okugo	6 ft 1 in (1.85 m)	170 lb (77 kg)	So	Jesuit; Yuba College	Sacramento, CA
G	21	Jerome Garrison	6 ft 3 in (1.91 m)	178 lb (81 kg)	Jr	Mountain Pointe	Phoenix, AZ
G	24	Joshua Braun	6 ft 4 in (1.93 m)	195 lb (88 kg)	Fr	Westwind Prep	Anthem, AZ
F	25	Miroslav Jakšić	6 ft 11 in (2.11 m)	220 lb (100 kg)	Fr	Walled Lake	Walled Lake, MI
G	31	Jeremy Adams	6 ft 5 in (1.96 m)	220 lb (100 kg)	RS Sr	Madison Central; Colorado	Madison, MS
C	32	Killian Larson	6 ft 9 in (2.06 m)	268 lb (122 kg)	Sr	Puyallup; Dominican (CA)	Puyallup, WA
F	40	Blake Davis	6 ft 6 in (1.98 m)	230 lb (104 kg)	Sr	St. Mary's; Weber State	Phoenix, AZ
F/C	52	Jake Zuilhof	6 ft 9 in (2.06 m)	220 lb (100 kg)	RS So	Azle	Azle, TX

Head coach

- Dan Majerle (Central Michigan)

Assistant coach(es)

- Todd Lee (Azusa Pacific)
- Mark Nelson (Kansas State)
- Chris Crevelone (Adams State)

Legend

- (C) Team captain
- (S) Suspended
- (I) Ineligible
- (W) Walk-on
- Injured
- Current redshirt

== Schedule and results ==
Date time, TV	Opponent	Result	Record	Site (attendance) city, state
European Tour
08/16/2013*; 2:00 pm	at VDA Rome	W 85–47		(N/A); Rome, Italy
08/18/2013*; 11:00 am	at AS Como	W 106–26		(N/A); Senna Comasco, Italy
08/21/2013*; 8:00 am	at Poseidon DC	W 106–26		(N/A); Greece
08/22/2013*; 8:00 am	at Doukas	W 87–50		(N/A); Athens, Greece
Exhibition
11/01/2013*; 7:00 pm, Cox7	UC San Diego	L 63–71		GCU Arena (4,410); Phoenix, AZ
Regular season
11/08/2013*; 5:30 pm, Cox7	vs. Loyola Marymount; USD Tournament	L 75–78	0–1	Jenny Craig Pavilion (N/A); San Diego, CA
11/09/2013*; 7:00 pm, Cox7	at San Diego; USD Tournament	L 59–70	0–2	Jenny Craig Pavilion (2,122); San Diego, CA
11/16/2013*; 7:00 pm, Cox7	Western New Mexico	W 91–41	1–2	GCU Arena (4,917); Phoenix, AZ
11/21/2013*; 6:00 pm, Utah Digital	at Utah; Global Sports Showcase	L 54–79	1–3	Huntsman Center (6,286); Salt Lake City, UT
11/22/2013*; 5:00 pm	vs. Savannah State; Global Sports Showcase	W 72–71	2–3	Huntsman Center (275); Salt Lake City, UT
11/23/2013*; 2:00 pm	vs. Lamar; Global Sports Showcase	W 78–69	3–3	Huntsman Center (293); Salt Lake City, UT
11/29/2013*; 7:00 pm, Cox7	San Diego Christian	W 91–61	4–3	GCU Arena (4,612); Phoenix, AZ
12/03/2013*; 7:00 pm, Cox7	Vanguard	W 82–73	5–3	GCU Arena (4,101); Phoenix, AZ
12/14/2013*; 3:00 pm, FSAZ+	at Northern Arizona	L 61–63	5–4	Walkup Skydome (2,434); Flagstaff, AZ
12/18/2013*; 6:00 pm, Cox7	at Tulsa	L 65–66	5–5	Reynolds Center (4,191); Tulsa, OK
12/23/2013*; 7:00 pm, RTRM	at New Mexico	L 68–80	5–6	The Pit (15,322); Albuquerque, NM
12/29/2013*; 5:00 pm	at Chattanooga; Dr. Pepper Classic	L 64–69	5–7	McKenzie Arena (3,248); Chattanooga, TN
12/30/2013*; 2:30 pm	vs. Middle Tennessee; Dr. Pepper Classic	L 56–79	5–8	McKenzie Arena (2,921); Chattanooga, TN
01/02/2014; 7:00 pm, Cox7	Texas–Pan American	W 91–85	6–8 (1–0)	GCU Arena (4,512); Phoenix, AZ
01/04/2014; 7:00 pm, Cox7	New Mexico State	L 62–84	6–9 (1–1)	GCU Arena (4,977); Phoenix, AZ
01/09/2014; 8:00 pm	at Cal State Bakersfield	W 66–63	7–9 (2–1)	Rabobank Arena (1,130); Bakersfield, CA
01/11/2014; 7:00 pm, UVU-TV	at Utah Valley	L 58–65	7–10 (2–2)	UCCU Center (2,114); Orem, UT
01/23/2014; 7:00 pm, Cox7	Idaho	W 86–73	8–10 (3–2)	GCU Arena (4,201); Phoenix, AZ
01/25/2014; 7:00 pm, Cox7	Seattle	W 71–63	9–10 (4–2)	GCU Arena (4,987); Phoenix, AZ
01/30/2014; 6:00 pm	at Chicago State	W 76–75	10–10 (5–2)	Emil and Patricia Jones Convocation Center (740); Chicago, IL
02/01/2014; 6:00 pm	at UMKC	W 72–53	11–10 (6–2)	Municipal Auditorium (2,011); Kansas City, MO
02/06/2014; 7:00 pm, Cox7	Utah Valley	L 68–79	11–11 (6–3)	GCU Arena (4,514); Phoenix, AZ
02/08/2014; 7:00 pm, Cox7	Cal State Bakersfield	W 79–70	12–11 (7–3)	GCU Arena (4,429); Phoenix, AZ
02/20/2014; 8:00 pm	at Seattle	W 74–73	13–11 (8–3)	KeyArena (2,269); Seattle, WA
02/22/2014; 8:00 pm	at Idaho	L 77–83	13–12 (8–4)	Cowan Spectrum (1,080); Moscow, ID
02/27/2014; 7:00 pm, Cox7	UMKC	L 80–85	13–13 (8–5)	GCU Arena (4,611); Phoenix, AZ
03/01/2014; 7:00 pm, Cox7	Chicago State	W 84–74	14–13 (9–5)	GCU Arena (4,888); Phoenix, AZ
03/06/2014; 7:00 pm, ESPN3	at New Mexico State	L 57–81	14–14 (9–6)	Pan American Center (6,547); Las Cruces, NM
03/08/2014; 6:00 pm	at Texas–Pan American	W 79–78 ^{OT}	15–14 (10–6)	UTPA Fieldhouse (1,187); Edinburg, TX
CIT
03/19/2014*; 7:00 pm, Cox7	Pacific; First round	L 67–69	15–15	Antelope Gymnasium (1,722); Phoenix, AZ
*Non-conference game. ^{#}Rankings from AP Poll. (#) Tournament seedings in parentheses. All times are in Mountain Time.

== Game summaries ==
=== Exhibition: UC San Diego ===
Broadcasters: Matt Rosen, Rex Chapman, and Barry Buetel
Series History: Grand Canyon leads the regular season series 10-8

Cox7

Nov 1
7:00 PM MST

Recap

UC San Diego Tritons 71, Grand Canyon Antelopes 63
Scoring by half: 30-29, 41-34
Pts: Mackenzie McCullough 22; Rebs: Mackenzie McCullough 7 Asts: Hunter Walker 5	Pts: Jerome Garrison 17; Rebs: Blake Davis 9 Asts: Blake Davis 7

GCU Arena
Phoenix, AZ
Attendance: 4,410
Referees: Tommy Nunez, Wilson Holland, Marc A. Beasley

=== Vs. Loyola Marymount ===
Series History: First Meeting
Broadcasters: Matt Rosen, Rex Chapman & Barry Buetel

Cox7

Nov 8
4:37 PM PST

Recap

Grand Canyon Antelopes 75, Loyola Marymount Lions 78
Scoring by half: 29-41, 46-37
Pts: Killian Larson 18; Rebs: Killian Larson 9 Asts: Jerome Garrison 3	Pts: Anthony Ireland 14; Rebs: Gabe Levin 9 Asts: Anthony Ireland 3

Jenny Craig Pavilion
San Diego, CA
Attendance: N/A
Referees: Scott Harris, Ronald Brokenbrough, Juan Corral

=== San Diego ===
Series History: Grand Canyon leads 10-8
Broadcasters: Matt Rosen, Rex Chapman & Barry Buetel

Cox7

Nov 9
6:07 PM PDT

Grand Canyon Antelopes 59, San Diego Toreros 70
Scoring by half: 27-40, 32-30
Pts: Demetrius Walker 19; Rebs: Killian Larson 15; Asts: Blake Davis 3	Pts: Johnny Dee 17; Rebs: Jito Kok 7 Asts: Christopher Anderson 12

Jenny Craig Pavilion
San Diego, CA
Attendance: 2,122
Referees: Michael Greenstein, Tom Nally, Matthew Rukasin
