= 2013–14 Idaho Vandals men's basketball team =

American college basketball season

2013–14 Idaho Vandals men's basketball
- Conference: Western Athletic Conference
- Record: 16–18 (7–9 WAC)
- Head coach: Don Verlin (6th season)
- Assistant coaches: Tim Murphy; Chris Helbling; Kirk Earlywine
- Home arena: Cowan Spectrum, Memorial Gym

2013–14 WAC men's basketball standings
	Conf.				Overall
Team	W		L	PCT	W		L	PCT
Utah Valley	13	–	3	.813	20	–	12	.625
New Mexico State †	12	–	4	.750	26	–	10	.722
Grand Canyon *	10	–	6	.625	15	–	15	.500
Chicago State	8	–	8	.500	13	–	19	.406
UMKC	7	–	9	.438	10	–	20	.333
Idaho	7	–	9	.438	16	–	17	.485
Cal State Bakersfield	5	–	11	.313	13	–	19	.406
Seattle	5	–	11	.313	13	–	17	.433
Texas–Pan American	5	–	11	.313	9	–	23	.281
† 2014 WAC tournament winner Rankings from AP poll * ineligible for postseason tournament as part of reclassification from NCAA Division II

The 2013–14 Idaho Vandals men's basketball team represented the University of Idaho during the 2013–14 NCAA Division I men's basketball season. The Vandals, led by sixth year head coach Don Verlin, played their home games at the Cowan Spectrum, with a few early season games at Memorial Gym, and were members of the Western Athletic Conference. They finished the season 16–18, 7–9 in WAC play to finish in a tie for fifth place. They advanced to the championship game of the WAC tournament where they lost to New Mexico State.

This was Idaho's final season in the WAC as they will join the Big Sky Conference for the 2014–15 season.

== Roster ==
Number	Name	Position	Height	Weight	Year	Hometown
1	Glen Dean	Guard	5–10	175	Senior	Seattle, Washington
2	Sekou Wiggs	Guard	6–3	182	Freshman	Seattle, Washington
3	Perrion Callandret	Guard	6–2	185	Freshman	Bothell, Washington
5	Connor Hill	Guard	6–2	190	Junior	Post Falls, Idaho
10	Patrick Ball	Guard	6–3	180	Freshman	Seattle, Washington
12	Mike Scott	Guard	6–0	180	Junior	Los Angeles, California
13	Bira Seck	Forward	6–6	215	Junior	Dakar, Senegal
14	Chad Sherwood	Guard	6–2	180	Freshman	Albany, Oregon
15	Paulin Mpawe	Forward	6–10	227	Sophomore	San Bernardino, California
32	Allen Jiles IV	Guard	6–3	200	Junior	Los Angeles, California
34	Stephen Madison	Forward	6–5	210	Senior	Portland, Oregon
41	Ty Egbert	Forward	6–8	200	Redshirt Freshman	Coulee Dam, Washington
42	Joe Kammerer	Center	6–9	241	Senior	Eugene, Oregon
44	Jordan Scott	Forward	6–6	200	Freshman	Colorado Springs, Colorado
50	Roberto Asencio	Center	6–9	245	Junior	Haina, Dominican Republic

== Schedule ==
Date time, TV	Opponent	Result	Record	Site (attendance) city, state
Exhibition
11/05/2013*; 7:00 pm	Walla Walla	W 90–49		Memorial Gym (N/A); Moscow, ID
Regular season
11/09/2013*; 7:00 pm	Western Illinois	W 67–63	1–0	Memorial Gym (1,326); Moscow, ID
11/13/2013*; 5:00 pm, FCS	at Oklahoma; Coaches Vs. Cancer Classic	L 65–85	1–1	Lloyd Noble Center (9,445); Norman, OK
11/16/2013*; 7:00 pm	Northwest Nazarene	W 78–64	2–1	Memorial Gym (1,148); Moscow, ID
11/21/2013*; 5:00 pm	at Portland; Coaches Vs. Cancer Classic	L 74–88	2–2	Chiles Center (1,159); Portland, OR
11/22/2013*; 7:00 pm	vs. North Texas; Coaches Vs. Cancer Classic	W 87–76	3–2	Chiles Center (1,444); Portland, OR
11/23/2013*; 4:30 pm	vs. Columbia; Coaches Vs. Cancer Classic	L 60–65	3–3	Chiles Center (1,668); Portland, OR
11/27/2013*; 6:00 pm, RTNW	vs. Boise State; Rivalry	L 89–98	3–4	CenturyLink Arena (5,747); Boise, ID
11/30/2013*; 2:00 pm	at UC Davis	W 80–76	4–4	The Pavilion (627); Davis, CA
12/07/2013*; 7:00 pm, SWX	Washington State; Battle of the Palouse	L 66–67	4–5	Cowan Spectrum (4,142); Moscow, ID
12/11/2013*; 6:00 pm	at Montana	L 58–69	4–6	Dahlberg Arena (2,882); Missoula, MT
12/14/2013*; 7:00 pm	at Portland State	W 76–75	5–6	Stott Center (614); Portland, OR
12/20/2013*; 6:00 pm	vs. Idaho State; Rivalry	W 69–65	6–6	CenturyLink Arena (1,987); Boise, ID
12/22/2013*; 7:00 pm	at Cal State Northridge	L 69–79	6–7	Matadome (550); Northridge, CA
12/28/2013*; 7:00 pm, ALT	Montana	L 71–72	6–8	Cowan Spectrum (1,427); Moscow, ID
01/02/2014; 7:00 pm	UMKC	L 74–80	6–9 (0–1)	Cowan Spectrum (1,021); Moscow, ID
01/04/2014; 7:00 pm	Chicago State	L 55–57	6–10 (0–2)	Cowan Spectrum (785); Moscow, ID
01/09/2014; 5:00 pm	at Texas–Pan American	W 86–85 ^{2OT}	7–10 (1–2)	UTPA Fieldhouse (624); Edinburg, TX
01/11/2014; 6:00 pm, RTNW	at New Mexico State	L 54–78	7–11 (1–3)	Pan American Center (5,111); Las Cruces, NM
01/16/2014; 7:00 pm, SWX	Utah Valley	L 66–71	7–12 (1–4)	Cowan Spectrum (1,227); Moscow, ID
01/18/2014; 7:00 pm	Cal State Bakersfield	W 64–61	8–12 (2–4)	Cowan Spectrum (1,414); Moscow, ID
01/23/2014; 6:00 pm	at Grand Canyon	L 73–86	8–13 (2–5)	GCU Arena (4,201); Phoenix, AZ
02/01/2014; 7:00 pm	Seattle	L 67–68	8–14 (2–6)	Cowan Spectrum (1,126); Moscow, ID
02/06/2014; 7:00 pm	New Mexico State	W 73–67	9–14 (3–6)	Cowan Spectrum (1,105); Moscow, ID
02/08/2014; 7:00 pm	Texas–Pan American	W 70–63 ^{OT}	10–14 (4–6)	Cowan Spectrum (1,717); Moscow, ID
02/13/2014; 7:00 pm	at Cal State Bakersfield	L 67–76	10–15 (4–7)	Rabobank Arena (1,019); Bakersfield, CA
02/15/2014; 6:00 pm	at Utah Valley	L 88–89	10–16 (4–8)	UCCU Center (2,012); Orem, UT
02/18/2014*; 7:00 pm	Cal State Northridge	W 96–88	11–16	Cowan Spectrum (1,067); Moscow, ID
02/22/2014; 7:00 pm	Grand Canyon	W 83–77	12–16 (5–8)	Cowan Spectrum (1,080); Moscow, ID
03/01/2014; 7:00 pm	at Seattle	L 68–76	12–17 (5–9)	KeyArena (3,573); Seattle, WA
03/06/2014; 5:00 pm	at Chicago State	W 79–76	13–17 (6–9)	Emil and Patricia Jones Convocation Center (926); Chicago, IL
03/08/2014; 5:30 pm	at UMKC	W 90–87	14–17 (7–9)	Independence Events Center (1,392); Kansas City, MO
WAC Tournament
03/13/2014; 2:30 pm	vs. UMKC; Quarterfinals	W 73–70	15–17	Orleans Arena (1,028); Paradise, NV
03/14/2014; 7:00 pm	vs. Utah Valley; Semifinals	W 74–69	16–17	Orleans Arena (1,402); Paradise, NV
03/15/2014; 8:00 pm, ESPNU	vs. New Mexico State; Championship	L 55–77	16–18	Orleans Arena (1,518); Paradise, NV
*Non-conference game. ^{#}Rankings from AP Poll. (#) Tournament seedings in parentheses. All times are in Pacific Time.
