= 2013–14 Cal State Bakersfield Roadrunners men's basketball team =

American college basketball season

2013–14 Cal State Bakersfield Roadrunners men's basketball
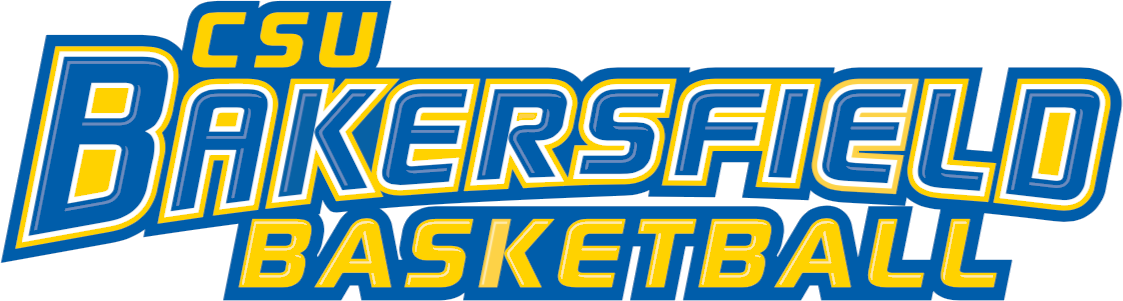
- Conference: Western Athletic Conference
- Record: 13–19 (5–11 WAC)
- Head coach: Rod Barnes (3rd season)
- Assistant coaches: Jeff Conarroe; Kevin Missouri
- Home arena: Icardo Center; Rabobank Arena

2013–14 WAC men's basketball standings
	Conf.				Overall
Team	W		L	PCT	W		L	PCT
Utah Valley	13	–	3	.813	20	–	12	.625
New Mexico State †	12	–	4	.750	26	–	10	.722
Grand Canyon *	10	–	6	.625	15	–	15	.500
Chicago State	8	–	8	.500	13	–	19	.406
UMKC	7	–	9	.438	10	–	20	.333
Idaho	7	–	9	.438	16	–	17	.485
Cal State Bakersfield	5	–	11	.313	13	–	19	.406
Seattle	5	–	11	.313	13	–	17	.433
Texas–Pan American	5	–	11	.313	9	–	23	.281
† 2014 WAC tournament winner Rankings from AP poll * ineligible for postseason tournament as part of reclassification from NCAA Division II

The 2013–14 Cal State Bakersfield Roadrunners men's basketball team represented California State University, Bakersfield during the 2013–14 NCAA Division I men's basketball season. The Roadrunners were led by third year head coach Rod Barnes and played their home games at the Icardo Center and the Rabobank Arena. The Roadrunners competed as a new member of the Western Athletic Conference. They finished the season 13–19, 5–11 in WAC play to finish in a three-way tie for seventh place. They advanced to the semifinals of the WAC tournament where they lost to New Mexico State.

== Roster ==
Number	Name	Position	Height	Weight	Year	Hometown
0	Stefon Johnson	Forward	6–6	210	Redshirt Senior	Cincinnati, Ohio
1	Brent Wrapp	Guard	6–3	170	Freshman	Boulder, Colorado
2	Tyrell Corbin	Guard	6–0	180	Junior	Salt Lake City, Utah
3	Javonte Maynor	Guard	6–0	175	Redshirt Junior	Snellville, Georgia
4	Matthew Ratto	Guard	5–11	160	Senior	Modesto, California
5	Zachary Lamb	Guard	6–3	180	Redshirt Senior	Norcross, Georgia
10	Antonio Jenifer	Forward	6–8	205	Junior	Potomac, Maryland
11	Jaylin Airington	Guard	6–4	180	Sophomore	East Chicago, Indiana
12	Issiah Grayson	Guard	5–11	165	Redshirt Senior	Atlanta, Georgia
15	Kregg Jones	Forward	6–8	235	Redshirt Junior	Saint George, Barbados
22	Corey Hall	Forward	6–7	210	Senior	Chicago, Illinois
23	Abdul Ahmed	Center	6–10	250	Redshirt Junior	London, Great Britain
24	Erik Kinney	Forward	6–4	210	Sophomore	Fairfield, California
25	Dee Wallace	Guard	5–10	150	Redshirt Junior	Oxford, Mississippi
30	Deng Deng	Forward	6–8	175	Sophomore	West Valley, Utah
32	Brandon Barnes	Guard	6–1	195	Redshirt Senior	Atlanta, Georgia
55	Tyler Smith	Center	6–11	265	Redshirt Junior	McLoud, Oklahoma

== Schedule ==
Date time, TV	Opponent	Result	Record	Site (attendance) city, state
Exitbition
11/02/2013*; 7:00 pm	Occidental	W 104–63		Icardo Center (259); Bakersfield, CA
Regular season
11/08/2013*; 7:00 pm, P12N	at Washington State	L 56–62	0–1	Beasley Coliseum (3,032); Pullman, WA
11/11/2013*; 7:00 pm	UC Merced	W 97–54	1–1	Icardo Center (1,818); Bakersfield, CA
11/13/2013*; 7:00 pm	Sacramento State	W 74–66	2–1	Icardo Center (1,201); Bakersfield, CA
11/18/2013*; 7:00 pm	Nevada	W 74–66	3–1	Rabobank Arena (1,612); Bakersfield, CA
11/23/2013*; 7:00 pm	Idaho State	W 71–69	4–1	Icardo Center (1,334); Bakersfield, CA
11/29/2013*; 4:30 pm	vs. Northern Arizona; Fresno State Classic	W 61–50	5–1	Save Mart Center (N/A); Fresno, CA
11/30/2013*; 7:00 pm	at Fresno State; Fresno State Classic	L 86–96 ^{OT}	5–2	Save Mart Center (6,022); Fresno, CA
12/01/2013*; 11:00 am	vs. Drake; Fresno State Classic	L 57–65	5–3	Save Mart Center (N/A); Fresno, CA
12/05/2013*; 7:00 pm	at Santa Clara	L 42–60	5–4	Leavey Center (820); Santa Clara, CA
12/10/2013*; 5:07 pm	at Nebraska-Omaha	L 88–93	5–5	Ralston Arena (1,024); Omaha, NE
12/15/2013*; 7:00 pm, P12N	at USC	L 59–63	5–6	Galen Center (2,463); Los Angeles, CA
12/18/2013*; 5:00 pm	at UTSA	W 90–64	6–6	Convocation Center (687); San Antonio, TX
12/21/2013*; 11:00 am	at Texas–Arlington	L 75–79 ^{OT}	6–7	College Park Center (1,137); Arlington, TX
12/28/2013*; 6:05 pm	at Idaho State	W 61–57	7–7	Holt Arena (1,502); Pocatello, ID
01/04/2014; 7:00 pm	Utah Valley	L 74–82	7–8 (0–1)	Rabobank Arena (2,045); Bakersfield, CA
01/09/2014; 7:00 pm	Grand Canyon	L 63-66	7–9 (0–2)	Rabobank Arena (1,130); Bakersfield, CA
01/16/2014; 7:00 pm	at Seattle	W 61–57	8–9 (1–2)	KeyArena (2,104); Seattle, WA
01/18/2014; 7:00 pm	at Idaho	L 61–64	8–10 (1–3)	Cowan Spectrum (1,414); Moscow, ID
01/23/2014; 7:00 pm	Chicago State	L 63–71	8–11 (1–4)	Icardo Center (1,005); Bakersfield, CA
01/25/2014; 7:00 pm	UMKC	L 69-70	8–12 (1–5)	Icardo Center (1,223); Bakersfield, CA
01/30/2014; 6:00 pm	at New Mexico State	L 86–89	8–13 (1–6)	Pan American Center (5,108); Las Cruces, NM
02/01/2014; 5:00 pm	at Texas–Pan American	W 72–64	9–13 (2–6)	UTPA Fieldhouse (792); Edinburg, TX
02/08/2014; 6:00 pm	at Grand Canyon	L 70–79	9–14 (2–7)	GCU Arena (4,429); Phoenix, AZ
02/13/2014; 7:00 pm	Idaho	W 76–67	10–14 (3–7)	Rabobank Arena (1,019); Bakersfield, CA
02/15/2014; 7:00 pm	Seattle	W 83–65	11–14 (4–7)	Rabobank Arena (1,149); Bakersfield, CA
02/20/2014; 5:00 pm	at UMKC	W 74–69	12–14 (5–7)	Independence Events Center (2,027); Kansas City, MO
02/22/2014; 12:05 pm	at Chicago State	L 68–73	12–15 (5–8)	Emil and Patricia Jones Convocation Center (769); Chicago, IL
02/27/2014; 7:00 pm	Texas–Pan American	L 61–63	12–16 (5–9)	Rabobank Arena (1,244); Bakersfield, CA
03/01/2014; 7:00 pm	New Mexico State	L 57–72	12–17 (5–10)	Rabobank Arena (838); Bakersfield, CA
03/07/2014; 6:05 pm	at Utah Valley	L 55–64	12–18 (5–11)	UCCU Center (5,068); Orem, UT
WAC tournament
03/13/2014; 8:30 pm	vs. Chicago State; Quarterfinals	W 68–62	13–18	Orleans Arena (1,188); Paradise, NV
03/14/2014; 9:30 pm	vs. New Mexico State; Semifinals	L 63–69	13–19	Orleans Arena (1,402); Paradise, NV
*Non-conference game. ^{#}Rankings from AP Poll. (#) Tournament seedings in parentheses. All times are in Pacific Time.
