= 2013–14 Seattle Redhawks men's basketball team =

American college basketball season

2013–14 Seattle Redhawks men's basketball
- Conference: Western Athletic Conference
- Record: 13–17 (5–11 WAC)
- Head coach: Cameron Dollar (5th season)
- Assistant coaches: Donald Dollar; Amadou "Pape" Koundoul; Darren Talley
- Home arena: KeyArena

2013–14 WAC men's basketball standings
	Conf.				Overall
Team	W		L	PCT	W		L	PCT
Utah Valley	13	–	3	.813	20	–	12	.625
New Mexico State †	12	–	4	.750	26	–	10	.722
Grand Canyon *	10	–	6	.625	15	–	15	.500
Chicago State	8	–	8	.500	13	–	19	.406
UMKC	7	–	9	.438	10	–	20	.333
Idaho	7	–	9	.438	16	–	17	.485
Cal State Bakersfield	5	–	11	.313	13	–	19	.406
Seattle	5	–	11	.313	13	–	17	.433
Texas–Pan American	5	–	11	.313	9	–	23	.281
† 2014 WAC tournament winner Rankings from AP poll * ineligible for postseason tournament as part of reclassification from NCAA Division II

The 2013–14 Seattle Redhawks men's basketball team represented Seattle University during the 2013–14 NCAA Division I men's basketball season. The Redhawks, led by fifth-year head coach Cameron Dollar, played their home games at KeyArena, with one home game at the ShoWare Center, and were members of the Western Athletic Conference. They finished the season 13–17, 5–11 in WAC play to finish in a three way tie for seventh place. They lost in the quarterfinals of the WAC tournament to New Mexico State.

== Roster ==
#	Name	Height	Weight (lbs)	Position	Class	Hometown
1	Isiah Umipig	6'0"	195	G	RS Jr.	Federal Way, Washington
2	Emerson Murray	6'3"	195	G	RS Jr.	Vancouver, British Columbia
5	D'Vonne Pickett, Jr.	6'0"	195	G	Sr.	Seattle, Washington
10	Theo Turner	6'11"	230	C	Fr.	Middlesbrough, England
11	Deshaun Sunderhaus	6'9"	215	F	RS So.	Rockdale County, Georgia
12	Clarence Trent	6'6"	225	F	RS Sr.	Tacoma, Washington
14	Emmanuel Chibuogwu	6'6"	185	G	RS Fr.	Shoreline, Washington
15	Shore Adenekan	6'9"	225	F	Jr.	London, England
21	William Powell	6'6"	210	F	Fr.	Huntsville, Alabama
23	Manroop Clair	6'2"	180	G	So.	Vancouver, British Columbia
24	Jack Crook	6'11"	255	C	So.	Manchester, England
25	David Trimble	6'1"	185	G	So.	Yakima, Washington
33	Luiz Bidart	6'0"	195	F	RS So.	São Paulo, Brazil
35	Jarell Flora	6'3"	180	G	RS Jr.	Bremerton, Washington

== Schedule ==
Date time, TV	Rank^{#}	Opponent^{#}	Result	Record	Site (attendance) city, state
Regular season
11/10/2013*; 7:00 pm, P12N		at Washington	L 78–88	0–1	Alaska Airlines Arena (6,704); Seattle, WA
11/13/2013*; 7:00 pm, RTNW		Cal State Fullerton	W 75–71	1–1	KeyArena (2,064); Seattle, WA
11/16/2013*; 7:00 pm		Evergreen State	W 100–59	2–1	KeyArena (2,886); Seattle, WA
11/19/2013*; 6:00 pm, RTNW		at Boise State	L 68–86	2–2	Taco Bell Arena (4,518); Boise, ID
11/25/2013*; 7:00 pm, RTNW		UC Riverside	W 69–68	3–2	KeyArena (1,883); Seattle, WA
11/29/2013*; 6:05 pm		at Eastern Washington	L 75–82	3–3	Reese Court (829); Cheney, WA
12/02/2013*; 7:00 pm		UC Davis	W 77–53	4–3	KeyArena (844); Seattle, WA
12/05/2013*; 7:05 pm		at Cal State Northridge	W 58–53	5–3	Matadome (551); Northridge, CA
12/07/2013*; 6:00 pm		at Cal State Fullerton	W 74–65	6–3	Titan Gym (659); Fullerton, CA
12/15/2013*; 2:00 pm		Pacific Lutheran	W 66–38	7–3	KeyArena (1,732); Seattle, WA
12/19/2013*; 7:00 pm		vs. Norfolk State; ShoWare Showdown	W 70–67	8–3	Showare Center (1,151); Kent, WA
12/22/2013*; 7:00 pm		at Nebraska–Omaha	L 69–76	8–4	Ralston Arena (1,593); Omaha, NE
12/30/2013*; 7:00 pm		UC Santa Barbara	L 70–86	8–5	KeyArena (2,092); Seattle, WA
01/04/2014; 7:00 pm		UMKC	L 84–95	8–6 (0–1)	KeyArena (2,537); Seattle, WA
01/09/2014; 6:00 pm, ESPN3		at New Mexico State	L 87–96	8–7 (0–2)	Pan American Center (5,007); Las Cruces, NM
01/11/2014; 5:00 pm		at Texas–Pan American	W 64–46	9–7 (1–2)	UTPA Fieldhouse (889); Edinburg, TX
01/16/2014; 7:00 pm		Cal State Bakersfield	L 57–61	9–8 (1–3)	KeyArena (2,104); Seattle, WA
01/19/2014; 1:00 pm		Utah Valley	L 51–52	9–9 (1–4)	KeyArena (1,934); Seattle, WA
01/25/2014; 6:00 pm		at Grand Canyon	L 63–71	9–10 (1–5)	GCU Arena (4,987); Phoenix, AZ
02/01/2014; 7:00 pm		at Idaho	W 68–67	10–10 (2–5)	Cowan Spectrum (1,126); Moscow, ID
02/06/2014; 7:00 pm		Texas–Pan American	W 83–62	11–10 (3–5)	KeyArena (1,663); Seattle, WA
02/08/2014; 7:00 pm, RTNW		New Mexico State	L 77–92	11–11 (3–6)	KeyArena (3,429); Seattle, WA
02/13/2014; 6:00 pm		at Utah Valley	W 71–57	12–11 (4–6)	UCCU Center (2,168); Orem, UT
02/15/2014; 7:00 pm		at Cal State Bakersfield	L 65–83	12–12 (4–7)	Rabobank Arena (1,149); Bakersfield, CA
02/20/2014; 7:00 pm		Grand Canyon	L 73–74	12–13 (4–8)	KeyArena (2,269); Seattle, WA
02/27/2014; 7:00 pm		Chicago State	L 77–84 ^{3OT}	12–14 (4–9)	KeyArena (1,689); Seattle, WA
03/01/2014; 7:00 pm, RTNW		Idaho	W 76–68	13–14 (5–9)	KeyArena (3,573); Seattle, WA
03/06/2014; 5:05 pm		at UMKC	L 73–82	13–15 (5–10)	Independence Events Center (1,502); Kansas City, MO
03/08/2014; 12:05 pm		at Chicago State	L 53–67	13–16 (5–11)	Emil and Patricia Jones Convocation Center (1,283); Chicago, IL
WAC tournament
03/13/2014; 6:00 pm		vs. New Mexico State; Quarterfinals	L 68–70	13–17	Orleans Arena (1,188); Paradise, NV
*Non-conference game. ^{#}Rankings from AP Poll. (#) Tournament seedings in parentheses. All times are in Pacific Time.
