= 2013–14 Utah Valley Wolverines men's basketball team =

American college basketball season

2013–14 Utah Valley Wolverines men's basketball

WAC Regular Season Champions

NIT First round vs. California, L 64–77
- Conference: Western Athletic Conference
- Record: 20–12 (13–3 WAC)
- Head coach: Dick Hunsaker (12th season)
- Assistant coaches: Curtis Condie; Terry Parker; Chris Sparks
- Home arena: UCCU Center

2013–14 WAC men's basketball standings
	Conf.				Overall
Team	W		L	PCT	W		L	PCT
Utah Valley	13	–	3	.813	20	–	12	.625
New Mexico State †	12	–	4	.750	26	–	10	.722
Grand Canyon *	10	–	6	.625	15	–	15	.500
Chicago State	8	–	8	.500	13	–	19	.406
UMKC	7	–	9	.438	10	–	20	.333
Idaho	7	–	9	.438	16	–	17	.485
Cal State Bakersfield	5	–	11	.313	13	–	19	.406
Seattle	5	–	11	.313	13	–	17	.433
Texas–Pan American	5	–	11	.313	9	–	23	.281
† 2014 WAC tournament winner Rankings from AP poll * ineligible for postseason tournament as part of reclassification from NCAA Division II

The 2013–14 Utah Valley Wolverines men's basketball team represented Utah Valley University in the 2013–14 NCAA Division I men's basketball season. Dick Hunsaker entered his twelfth season as the UVU head coach. The Wolverines played their home games at the UCCU Center as new members of the Western Athletic Conference. They finished the season 20–12, 13–3 in WAC play to win the WAC regular season championship. They advanced to the semifinals of the WAC tournament where they lost to Idaho. As a regular season conference champion who failed to win their conference tournament, they received an automatic bid to the National Invitation Tournament where they lost in the first round to California.

== Roster ==
2013–14 Utah Valley Wolverines men's basketball team
Players
Coaches

Pos.	#	Name	Height	Weight	Year	Previous school	Hometown
G	2	Hayes Garrity	6 ft 1 in (1.85 m)	—	So	Westview; Big Bend CC	Beaverton, OR
G	3	Keawe Enos	6 ft 1 in (1.85 m)	—	Sr	Red Mountain; Mesa CC	Mesa, AZ
G	12	Holton Hunsaker	6 ft 0 in (1.83 m)	—	Jr	Woods Cross	North Salt Lake City, UT
F	15	Jason Johnson	6 ft 5 in (1.96 m)	—	RS Jr	Eagle; Utah State	Boise, ID
F	21	Zach Nelson	6 ft 7 in (2.01 m)	—	Fr	Yuba City	Yuba City, CA
F	22	Chad Ross	6 ft 7 in (2.01 m)	—	Jr	South Gwinnett; Waycross CC	Snellville, GA
G	32	Taylor Brown	6 ft 5 in (1.96 m)	—	Jr	Alta	Draper, UT
F	33	Marquis Salmon	6 ft 7 in (2.01 m)	—	Fr	Village Christian	Los Angeles, CA
C	34	Ben Aird	6 ft 9 in (2.06 m)	—	Sr	Bountiful	Bountiful, UT
F	44	Eli Robison	6 ft 5 in (1.96 m)	—	RS Fr	Timpview	Provo, UT

Head coach

- Dick Hunsaker (Weber State)

Assistant coach(es)

- Curtis Condie (Utah State)
- Terry Parker (Louisiana Tech)

Legend

- (C) Team captain
- (S) Suspended
- (I) Ineligible
- (W) Walk-on
- Injured
- Current redshirt

== Radio broadcasts and streams ==
All Wolverines games will air on KOVO, part of The Zone family of networks. Games will be streamed online through The Zone's webpage as well as at Utah Valley's Stretch Internet feed.

== Schedule and results ==
The Wolverines participated in a China Trip during the month of August for their exhibition season. The Wolverines trip took 15 days and had 9 games. Included in the matches were Chinese Basketball Association Teams in Hangzhou, Shaoxing, Jinhua, Wenzhou, and Shenzhen. The exhibition trip was managed by World Vision Sports Management.

Date time, TV	Rank^{#}	Opponent^{#}	Result	Record	Site (attendance) city, state
Regular season
11/08/2013*; 7:05 pm, UVU-TV		IUPUI	W 74–66	1–0	UCCU Center (1,437); Orem, UT
11/11/2013*; 7:05 pm, UVU-TV		North Carolina A&T	W 78–71	2–0	UCCU Center (1,821); Orem, UT
11/12/2013*; 6:00 pm, FCS		at No. 8 Oklahoma State	L 40–93	2–1	Gallagher-Iba Arena (7,526); Stillwater, OK
11/19/2013*; 7:00 pm, P12N		at No. 17 Oregon	L 54–69	2–2	Matthew Knight Arena (5,717); Eugene, OR
11/23/2013*; 6:00 pm, TV-32		at Pepperdine	L 53–58	2–3	Firestone Fieldhouse (614); Malibu, CA
11/30/2013*; 6:00 pm		at Tennessee Tech	L 71–74	2–4	Eblen Center (847); Cookeville, TN
12/02/2013*; 6:00 pm		at South Dakota	L 67–71	2–5	DakotaDome (1,335); Vermillion, SD
12/07/2013*; 7:05 pm		St. Katherine	W 89–37	3–5	UCCU Center (530); Orem, UT
12/11/2013*; 7:05 pm, UVU-TV		Weber State; Old Oquirrh Bucket	W 62–59	4–5	UCCU Center (2,921); Orem, UT
12/14/2013*; 7:00 pm		at Utah State; Old Oquirrh Bucket	L 60–71	4–6	Smith Spectrum (9,571); Logan, UT
12/20/2013*; 7:05 pm		Haskell	W 103–64	5–6	UCCU Center (480); Orem, UT
12/23/2013*; 7:05 pm		North Dakota State	L 70–74	5–7	UCCU Center (1,092); Orem, UT
12/28/2013*; 7:05 pm		Tennessee Tech	W 75–66	6–7	UCCU Center (1,428); Orem, UT
01/04/2014; 8:00 pm		at Cal State Bakersfield	W 82–74	7–7 (1–0)	Rabobank Arena (2,045); Bakersfield, CA
01/11/2014; 7:05 pm, UVU-TV		Grand Canyon	W 65–58	8–7 (2–0)	UCCU Center (2,114); Orem, UT
01/16/2014; 8:00 pm		at Idaho	W 71–66	9–7 (3–0)	Cowan Spectrum (1,227); Moscow, ID
01/19/2014; 2:00 pm		at Seattle	W 52–51	10–7 (4–0)	KeyArena (1,934); Seattle, WA
01/23/2014; 7:05 pm, UVU-TV		UMKC	W 66–48	11–7 (5–0)	UCCU Center (2,471); Orem, UT
01/25/2014; 7:05 pm, UVU-TV		Chicago State	W 62–55	12–7 (6–0)	UCCU Center (2,119); Orem, UT
01/30/2014; 6:00 pm		at Texas–Pan American	W 67–53	13–7 (7–0)	UTPA Fieldhouse (1,263); Edinburg, TX
02/01/2014; 7:00 pm, ESPN3		at New Mexico State	L 49–72	13–8 (7–1)	Pan American Center (6,297); Las Cruces, NM
02/06/2014; 7:00 pm, Cox7		at Grand Canyon	W 79–68	14–8 (8–1)	GCU Arena (4,514); Phoenix, AZ
02/13/2014; 7:05 pm, UVU-TV		Seattle	L 57–71	14–9 (8–2)	UCCU Center (2,168); Orem, UT
02/15/2014; 7:05 pm, UVU-TV		Idaho	W 89–88	15–9 (9–2)	UCCU Center (2,012); Orem, UT
02/20/2014; 6:05 pm		at Chicago State	W 79–70	16–9 (10–2)	Emil and Patricia Jones Convocation Center (811); Chicago, IL
02/22/2014; 6:05 pm		at UMKC	L 56–74	16–10 (10–3)	Independence Events Center (2,232); Kansas City, MO
02/27/2014; 7:05 pm, UVU-TV		New Mexico State	W 66–61 ^{OT}	17–10 (11–3)	UCCU Center (4,954); Orem, UT
03/01/2014; 7:05 pm, UVU-TV		Texas–Pan American	W 45–42	18–10 (12–3)	UCCU Center (2,641); Orem, UT
03/07/2014; 7:05 pm, UVU-TV		Cal State Bakersfield	W 64–55	19–10 (13–3)	UCCU Center (5,068); Orem, UT
2014 WAC tournament
03/13/2014; 12:00 pm		vs. Texas–Pan American; Quarterfinals	W 83–63	20–10	Orleans Arena (1,028); Paradise, NV
03/14/2014; 7:00 pm		vs. Idaho; Semifinals	L 69–74	20–11	Orleans Arena (1,402); Paradise, NV
NIT
03/19/2014; 8:30 pm, ESPN3	No. (7)	(2) California; First round	L 64–77	20–12	Haas Pavilion (1,670); Berkeley, CA
*Non-conference game. ^{#}Rankings from AP Poll, (#) during NIT is seed within region. (#) Tournament seedings in parentheses. All times are in Mountain Time.
