= 2013–14 New Mexico State Aggies men's basketball team =

American college basketball season

2013–14 New Mexico State Aggies men's basketball

WAC tournament champions

NCAA tournament, round of 64
- Conference: Western Athletic Conference
- Record: 26–10 (12–4 WAC)
- Head coach: Marvin Menzies (7th season)
- Assistant coaches: Paul Weir; Keith Brown; Aerick Sanders
- Home arena: Pan American Center

2013–14 WAC men's basketball standings
	Conf.				Overall
Team	W		L	PCT	W		L	PCT
Utah Valley	13	–	3	.813	20	–	12	.625
New Mexico State †	12	–	4	.750	26	–	10	.722
Grand Canyon *	10	–	6	.625	15	–	15	.500
Chicago State	8	–	8	.500	13	–	19	.406
UMKC	7	–	9	.438	10	–	20	.333
Idaho	7	–	9	.438	16	–	17	.485
Cal State Bakersfield	5	–	11	.313	13	–	19	.406
Seattle	5	–	11	.313	13	–	17	.433
Texas–Pan American	5	–	11	.313	9	–	23	.281
† 2014 WAC tournament winner Rankings from AP poll * ineligible for postseason tournament as part of reclassification from NCAA Division II

The 2013–14 New Mexico State Aggies men's basketball team represented New Mexico State University during the 2013–14 NCAA Division I men's basketball season. The Aggies, led by seventh year head coach Marvin Menzies, played their home games at the Pan American Center and were members of the Western Athletic Conference. They finished the season 26–10, 12–4 in WAC play to finish in second place. They were champions of the WAC tournament to earn an automatic bid to the NCAA tournament. In their 21st NCAA Tournament appearance, they lost in the second round to San Diego State.

== Previous season ==
The Aggies finished the season 24–11, 14–4 in WAC play to finish in third place.

== Departures ==
Name	Number	Pos.	Height	Weight	Year	Hometown	Notes
Terrel de Rouen	14	G	6'1"	165	Sophomore	Las Cruces, New Mexico	Transferred to North Dakota
Bandja Sy	10	F	6'8"	214	Senior	Cergy, France	Graduated
Eric Weary	11	G	6'5"	210	RS-Freshman	New Orleans, Louisiana	Transferred to Howard Community College
Emery Coleman	21	G	6'3"	180	RS-Freshman	Tularosa, New Mexico	Left the team
B.J. West	35	F	6'11"	240	RS-Junior	Cheneyville, Louisiana	Left the team
Tyrone Watson	45	F	6'5"	225	Senior	Hamilton, Ontario	Graduated

== Incoming transfers ==
Name	Number	Pos.	Height	Weight	Year	Hometown	Previous School
D.K. Eldridge	1	G	6'2"	180	Junior	Dallas, TX	Junior college transfer from New Mexico JC

== 2013 Recruiting Class ==
College recruiting information
Name	Hometown	School	Height	Weight	Commit date
Johnathon Wilkins; F	Lille, France	La Lumiere HS	6 ft 10 in (2.08 m)	225 lb (102 kg)	Aug 26, 2013
Johnathon Wilkins; F	Recruit ratings: Rivals: (73)				
Jalyn Pennie; G	Toronto, ON	Christian Faith Center Academy	6 ft 7 in (2.01 m)	180 lb (82 kg)	Oct 10, 2012
Jalyn Pennie; G	Recruit ratings: No ratings found				
Pascal Siakam; F	Toronto, ON	God's Academy	6 ft 9 in (2.06 m)	230 lb (100 kg)	
Pascal Siakam; F	Recruit ratings: No ratings found				
Tanveer Bhullar; C	Toronto, ON	Father Henry Carr Secondary	7 ft 3 in (2.21 m)	335 lb (152 kg)	Jul 16, 2013
Tanveer Bhullar; C	Recruit ratings: 247Sports: (61)				
Ian Baker; G	Washington DC	Arlington Country Day HS	6 ft 0 in (1.83 m)	180 lb (82 kg)	
Ian Baker; G	Recruit ratings: Scout: Rivals: 247Sports: (87)				
Overall recruit ranking:
Note: In many cases, Scout, Rivals, 247Sports, On3, and ESPN may conflict in their listings of height and weight.; In these cases, the average was taken. ESPN grades are on a 100-point scale.; Sources: "2015 New Mexico State Basketball Commits". ESPN.

== Roster ==
2013–14 New Mexico State Aggies men's basketball team
Players
Coaches

Pos.	#	Name	Height	Weight	Year	Previous school	Hometown
G	0	Travon Landry	6 ft 1 in (1.85 m)	176 lb (80 kg)	Fr	Huntington Prep	San Antonio, TX
G	1	DK Eldridge	6 ft 2 in (1.88 m)	180 lb (82 kg)	Jr	New Mexico JC; Lincoln High School	Dallas, TX
C	2	Sim Bhullar	7 ft 5 in (2.26 m)	360 lb (163 kg)	So	Huntington Prep	Toronto, ON
F	3	Remi Barry	6 ft 7 in (2.01 m)	210 lb (95 kg)	Jr	Del Oro High School	Paris, France
G	4	Ian Baker	6 ft 0 in (1.83 m)	180 lb (82 kg)	Fr	Arlington Country Day HS	Washington, D.C.
G	5	Kevin Aronis	6 ft 3 in (1.91 m)	185 lb (84 kg)	Sr	Santa Rosa Junior College; Analy High School	Sebastopol, California
G	12	K.C. Ross-Miller	6 ft 0 in (1.83 m)	180 lb (82 kg)	Jr	New Orleans; God's Academy	Grand Prairie, Texas
C	15	Tshilidzi Nephawe	6 ft 10 in (2.08 m)	268 lb (122 kg)	RS Jr	Stoneridge Prep	Johannesburg, South Africa
F	20	Matej Buovac	6 ft 7 in (2.01 m)	220 lb (100 kg)	So	La Lumiere HS	Zagreb, Croatia
G	23	Daniel Mullings	6 ft 2 in (1.88 m)	170 lb (77 kg)	Jr	Sir Wilfrid Laurier Collegiate Institute	Toronto, ON
G	25	Renaldo Dixon	6 ft 10 in (2.08 m)	210 lb (95 kg)	Sr	Christian Faith Academy	Toronto, ON
F	34	Aaron Kubinski	6 ft 5 in (1.96 m)	195 lb (88 kg)	So	La Cueva High School	Albuquerque, NM
F		Johnathon Wilkins (redshirt)	6 ft 10 in (2.08 m)	225 lb (102 kg)	Fr	La Lumiere HS	Lille, France
G		Jalyn Pennie (redshirt)	6 ft 7 in (2.01 m)	180 lb (82 kg)	Fr	Christian Faith Center Academy	Toronto, ON
F		Pascal Siakam (redshirt)	6 ft 9 in (2.06 m)	230 lb (104 kg)	Fr	God's Academy	Douala, Cameroon
C		Tanveer Bhullar (redshirt)	7 ft 3 in (2.21 m)	335 lb (152 kg)	Fr	Father Henry Carr Secondary	Toronto, ON

Head coach

- Marvin Menzies (UCLA)

Assistant coach(es)

- Paul Weir (York)
- Keith Brown (Pacific)
- Aerick Sanders (San Diego State)

Legend

- (C) Team captain
- (S) Suspended
- (I) Ineligible
- (W) Walk-on
- Injured
- Current redshirt

Roster

== Schedule ==
Date time, TV	Rank^{#}	Opponent^{#}	Result	Record	High points	High rebounds	High assists	Site (attendance) city, state
Exhibition
10/29/2013*; 7:00 pm		Western New Mexico	W 97–68	–	18 – Buovac	10 – T. Bhullar	–	Pan American Center (2,351); Las Cruces, NM
Regular season
11/08/2013*; 11:30 pm		vs. Western Michigan; Hawaiʻi Tournament	L 64–70	0–1	18 – Nephawe	8 – Nephawe	4 – Ross-Miller	Stan Sheriff Center (5,720); Honolulu, HI
11/09/2013*; 8:00 pm		vs. Tennessee State; Hawaiʻi Tournament	W 70–55	1–1	16 – Mullings	11 – Nephawe	6 – Ross-Miller	Stan Sheriff Center (N/A); Honolulu, HI
11/11/2013*; 3:00 am, ESPN2		at Hawaiʻi; Hawaiʻi Tournament	W 95–88	2–1	21 – Mullings	10 – S. Bhullar	5 – Mullings	Stan Sheriff Center (5,495); Honolulu, HI
11/15/2013*; 7:00 pm, AggieVision		UTEP; The Battle of I-10	W 86–73	3–1	26 – Mullings	12 – Nephawe	3 – Eldridge	Pan American Center (10,019); Las Cruces, NM
11/20/2013*; 7:00 pm, AggieVision		Northern Colorado; Colorado State Challenge	W 67–63	4–1	20 – Mullings	7 – Tied	5 – Ross-Miller	Pan American Center (5,444); Las Cruces, NM
11/23/2013*; 7:00 pm		at UTEP; The Battle of I-10	W 77–68	5–1	26 – Ross-Miller	9 – Nephawe	6 – Ross-Miller	Don Haskins Center (11,127); El Paso, TX
11/25/2013*; 7:00 pm, AggieVision		Bethune-Cookman; Colorado State Challenge	W 79–56	6–1	18 – Nephawe	9 – Tied	7 – Ross-Miller	Pan American Center (4,985); Las Cruces, NM
11/27/2013*; 7:00 pm		Prairie View A&M; Colorado State Challenge	W 91–60	7–1	17 – Mullings	9 – Mullings	3 – S. Bhullar	Pan American Center (4,804); Las Cruces, NM
11/30/2013*; 4:00 pm, RTRM		at Colorado State; Colorado State Challenge	L 83–85	7–2	24 – Mullings	8 – S. Bhullar	9 – Mullings	Moby Arena (3,693); Fort Collins, CO
12/04/2013*; 7:00 pm, RTRM		New Mexico; Rio Grande Rivalry	L 70–79	7–3	16 – Mullings	10 – S. Bhullar	2 – Ross-Miller	Pan American Center (9,184); Las Cruces, NM
12/07/2013*; 9:00 pm, ESPNU		at No. 19 Gonzaga	L 68–80	7–4	17 – Mullings	8 – Nephawe	5 – Mullings	McCarthey Athletic Center (6,000); Spokane, WA
12/11/2013*; 7:00 pm, P12N		at No. 1 Arizona	L 48–74	7–5	18 – Mullings	7 – S. Bhullar	3 – Mullings	McKale Center (14,545); Tucson, AZ
12/14/2013*; 6:00 pm		at Drake	W 81–69 ^{OT}	8–5	22 – S. Bhullar	12 – S. Bhullar	5 – Ross-Miller	Knapp Center (3,288); Des Moines, IA
12/17/2013*; 7:00 pm, ESPN3		at New Mexico; Rio Grande Rivalry	W 67–61	9–5	16 – Ross-Miller	7 – Dixon	5 – Mullings	The Pit (15,411); Albuquerque, NM
12/21/2013*; 7:00 pm		Northern New Mexico	W 97–47	10–5	18 – Tied	10 – S. Bhullar	6 – Landry	Pan American Center (4,888); Las Cruces, NM
12/28/2013*; 7:00 pm		South Alabama	W 82–64	11–5	18 – Mullings	12 – Eldridge	10 – Ross-Miller	Pan American Center (4,694); Las Cruces, NM
01/04/2014; 7:00 pm		at Grand Canyon	W 84–62	12–5 (1–0)	20 – Aronis	11 – Nephawe	4 – Eldridge	GCU Arena (4,977); Phoenix, AZ
01/09/2014; 7:00 pm, AggieVision		Seattle	W 96–87	13–5 (2–0)	18 – Tied	11 – Mullings	6 – Mullings	Pan American Center (5,007); Las Cruces, NM
01/11/2014; 7:00 pm, RTRM		Idaho	W 78–54	14–5 (3–0)	16 – Tied	11 – Nephawe	4 – Eldridge	Pan American Center (5,111); Las Cruces, NM
01/16/2014; 6:00 pm		at Chicago State	L 81–86	14–6 (3–1)	26 – Mullings	12 – Nephawe	6 – Ross-Miller	Emil and Patricia Jones Convocation Center (1,188); Chicago, IL
01/18/2014; 6:00 pm		at UMKC	L 66–68	14–7 (3–2)	33 – Dixon	11 – Mullings	2 – Tied	Municipal Auditorium (1,526); Kansas City, MO
01/25/2014; 7:00 pm, AggieVision		Texas–Pan American	W 90–78	15–7 (4–2)	32 – Mullings	15 – Nephawe	6 – Ross-Miller	Pan American Center (6,434); Las Cruces, NM
01/30/2014; 7:00 pm, AggieVision		Cal State Bakersfield	W 89–86	16–7 (5–2)	19 – Mullings	9 – Nephawe	4 – Ross-Miller	Pan American Center (5,108); Las Cruces, NM
02/01/2014; 7:00 pm, AggieVision		Utah Valley	W 72–49	17–7 (6–2)	21 – Mullings	8 – Tied	3 – Eldridge	Pan American Center (6,297); Las Cruces, NM
02/06/2014; 8:00 pm		at Idaho	L 67–73	17–8 (6–3)	20 – Mullings	7 – Tied	4 – Mullings	Cowan Spectrum (1,105); Moscow, ID
02/08/2014; 8:00 pm, RTRM/AggieVision		at Seattle	W 92–77	18–8 (7–3)	22 – Nephawe	8 – Nephawe	4 – Tied	KeyArena (3,429); Seattle, WA
02/13/2014; 7:00 pm, AggieVision		UMKC; Lou Henson Classic	W 71–48	19–8 (8–3)	15 – Nephawe	13 – Nephawe	4 – Tied	Pan American Center (5,111); Las Cruces, NM
02/15/2014; 7:00 pm, AggieVision		Chicago State	W 84–55	20–8 (9–3)	20 – Dixon	9 – Dixon	3 – Tied	Pan American Center (5,591); Las Cruces, NM
02/20/2014; 6:00 pm		at Texas–Pan American	W 78–61	21–8 (10–3)	18 – Mullings	7 – Mullings	6 – Mullings	UTPA Fieldhouse (1,002); Edinburg, TX
02/27/2014; 7:00 pm		at Utah Valley	L 61–66 ^{OT}	21–9 (10–4)	19 – Mullings	14 – S. Bhullar	5 – Mullings	UCCU Center (4,954); Orem, UT
03/01/2014; 8:00 pm		at Cal State Bakersfield	W 72–57	22–9 (11–4)	15 – Nephawe	16 – Nephawe	5 – S. Bhullar	Rabobank Arena (838); Bakersfield, CA
03/06/2014; 7:00 pm, AggieVision		Grand Canyon	W 81–57	23–9 (12–4)	22 – S. Bhullar	12 – S. Bhullar	5 – S. Bhullar	Pan American Center (6,547); Las Cruces, NM
WAC tournament
03/13/2014; 7:00 pm		vs. Seattle; Quarterfinals	W 70–68	24–9	24 – S. Bhullar	14 – S. Bhullar	6 – Mullings	Orleans Arena (1,188); Paradise, NV
03/14/2014; 8:30 pm		vs. Cal State Bakersfield; Semifinals	W 69–63	25–9	21 – Mullings	9 – Nephawe	4 – Mullings	Orleans Arena (1,402); Paradise, NV
03/15/2014; 8:00 pm, ESPNU		vs. Idaho; Championship	W 77–55	26–9	18 – Mullings	9 – S. Bhullar	4 – Tied	Orleans Arena (1,518); Paradise, NV
2014 NCAA Division I men's basketball tournament
03/20/2014; 7:57 pm, truTV	No. (13 W)	vs. No. 13 (4 W) San Diego State; Second round	L 69–73 ^{OT}	26–10	18 – Mullings	8 – Nephawe	4 – Mullings	Spokane Arena (10,962); Spokane, WA
*Non-conference game. ^{#}Rankings from AP Poll. (#) Tournament seedings in parentheses. All times are in Mountain Time. (#) during NCAA Tournament is seed with Region W=West.
