= 2013–14 Chicago State Cougars men's basketball team =

American college basketball season

2013–14 Chicago State Cougars men's basketball
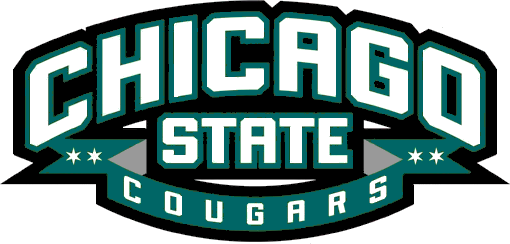
- Conference: Western Athletic Conference
- Record: 13–19 (8–8 WAC)
- Head coach: Tracy Dildy (4th season)
- Assistant coaches: James Farr; Sean Pryor; Matt Raidbard
- Home arena: Emil and Patricia Jones Convocation Center

2013–14 WAC men's basketball standings
	Conf.				Overall
Team	W		L	PCT	W		L	PCT
Utah Valley	13	–	3	.813	20	–	12	.625
New Mexico State †	12	–	4	.750	26	–	10	.722
Grand Canyon *	10	–	6	.625	15	–	15	.500
Chicago State	8	–	8	.500	13	–	19	.406
UMKC	7	–	9	.438	10	–	20	.333
Idaho	7	–	9	.438	16	–	17	.485
Cal State Bakersfield	5	–	11	.313	13	–	19	.406
Seattle	5	–	11	.313	13	–	17	.433
Texas–Pan American	5	–	11	.313	9	–	23	.281
† 2014 WAC tournament winner Rankings from AP poll * ineligible for postseason tournament as part of reclassification from NCAA Division II

The 2013–14 Chicago State Cougars men's basketball team represented Chicago State University during the 2013–14 NCAA Division I men's basketball season. The Cougars, led by fourth year head coach Tracy Dildy, played their home games at the Emil and Patricia Jones Convocation Center as new members of the Western Athletic Conference. They finished the season 13–19, 8–8 in WAC play to finish in fourth place. They lost in the quarterfinals of the WAC tournament to Cal State Bakersfield.

== Roster ==
Number	Name	Position	Height	Weight	Year	Hometown
0	Corey Gray	Guard	5–11	180	Senior	Houston, Texas
1	Eddie Denard	Forward	6–6	235	Senior	Chicago, Illinois
2	Jamere Dismukes	Guard	6–1	175	Senior	Park Forest, Illinois
3	Johnny Griffin	Guard	6–5	185	Freshman	Ford Heights, Illinois
5	Arthur Gage	Center	6–10	225	Senior	Plainfield, Illinois
10	Kurt Karis	Guard	6–1	190	Freshman	Northbrook, Illinois
11	Jared Dimakos	Guard	6–5	200	Sophomore	Lincolnshire, Illinois
14	Rahjan Muhammad	Guard	6–0	188	Junior	Bolingbrook, Illinois
21	Joshua Batson	Guard	5–11	165	Sophomore	Chicago, Illinois
23	Aaron Williams	Forward	6–6	215	Senior	Chicago, Illinois
32	Nate Duhon	Guard	6–3	197	Senior	Lansing, Michigan
33	Quinton Pippen	Guard/Forward	6–4	205	Senior	Hamburg, Arkansas
34	Quron Davis	Forward	6–9	235	Freshman	Chicago, Illinois
35	Clarke Rosenberg	Guard	6–3	170	Junior	Skokie, Illinois
42	Matt Ross	Forward	6–8	220	Senior	Dixon, Illinois
45	Willie Rosenthal	Center	6–11	220	Redshirt Freshman	Rolling Meadows, Illinois
54	Marcus Starks	Forward	6–5	210	Senior	Calumet City, Illinois
	Joshua Ramsey	Forward	6–7	215	Junior	Saint Louis, Missouri

== Schedule and results ==
Date time, TV	Opponent	Result	Record	Site (attendance) city, state
Regular season
11/08/2013*; 6:00 pm	at Indiana	L 72–100	0–1	Assembly Hall (17,472); Bloomington, IN
11/09/2013*; 4:30 pm	Urbana	W 77–52	1–1	Emil and Patricia Jones Convocation Center (1,248); Chicago, IL
11/12/2013*; 7:05 pm	Jacksonville State; Global Sports Invitational	W 79–75	2–1	Emil and Patricia Jones Convocation Center (897); Chicago, IL
11/15/2013*; 7:00 pm	at Bradley; Global Sports Invitational	L 64–77	2–2	Carver Arena (6,797); Peoria, IL
11/18/2013*; 7:00 pm	at Alabama State; Global Sports Invitational	L 75–79	2–3	Dunn-Oliver Acadome (874); Montgomery, AL
11/22/2013*; 8:00 pm, BTN	at Illinois; Global Sports Invitational	L 53–77	2–4	State Farm Center (15,488); Champaign, IL
11/30/2013*; 2:05 pm	Southern Illinois	W 88–84	3–4	Emil and Patricia Jones Convocation Center (1,347); Chicago, IL
12/04/2013*; 7:05 pm	at Illinois State	L 56–75	3–5	Redbird Arena (4,211); Normal, IL
12/07/2013*; 2:05 pm	UW-Parkside	W 90–81	4–5	Emil and Patricia Jones Convocation Center (618); Chicago, IL
12/15/2013*; 3:30 pm, FS1	at DePaul	L 70–77 ^{OT}	4–6	Allstate Arena (6,627); Rosemont, IL
12/16/2013*; 7:05 pm	SIU Edwardsville	W 81–64	5–6	Emil and Patricia Jones Convocation Center (525); Chicago, IL
12/23/2013*; 6:00 pm, ESPN3	at Cincinnati	L 62–102	5–7	Fifth Third Arena (5,564); Cincinnati, OH
12/30/2013*; 4:00 pm, FS1	at Creighton	L 58–90	5–8	CenturyLink Center Omaha (17,466); Omaha, NE
01/02/2014; 9:00 pm	at Idaho	W 57–55	6–8 (1–0)	Cowan Spectrum (785); Moscow, ID
01/07/2014*; 7:05 pm	Green Bay	L 62–98	6–9	Emil and Patricia Jones Convocation Center (879); Chicago, IL
01/11/2014; 5:15 pm	at UMKC	W 68–66	7–9 (2–0)	Municipal Auditorium (2,023); Kansas City, MO
01/16/2014; 7:05 pm	New Mexico State	W 86–81	8–9 (3–0)	Emil and Patricia Jones Convocation Center (1,188); Chicago, IL
01/18/2014; 2:05 pm	Texas–Pan American	L 61–84	8–10 (3–1)	Emil and Patricia Jones Convocation Center (880); Chicago, IL
01/23/2014; 9:00 pm	at Cal State Bakersfield	W 71–63	9–10 (4–1)	Icardo Center (1,005); Bakersfield, CA
01/25/2014; 8:05 pm	at Utah Valley	L 55–62	9–11 (4–2)	UCCU Center (2,119); Orem, UT
01/30/2014; 7:05 pm	Grand Canyon	L 75–76	9–12 (4–3)	Emil and Patricia Jones Convocation Center (740); Chicago, IL
02/08/2014; 4:30 pm	UMKC	W 81–74	10–12 (5–3)	Emil and Patricia Jones Convocation Center (1,008); Chicago, IL
02/13/2014; 7:00 pm	at Texas–Pan American	L 68–71 ^{OT}	10–13 (5–4)	UTPA Fieldhouse (1,276); Edinburg, TX
02/15/2014; 8:00 pm	at New Mexico State	L 55–84	10–14 (5–5)	Pan American Center (5,591); Las Cruces, NM
02/20/2014; 7:05 pm	Utah Valley	L 70–79	10–15 (5–6)	Emil and Patricia Jones Convocation Center (811); Chicago, IL
02/22/2014; 2:05 pm	Cal State Bakersfield	W 73–68	11–15 (6–6)	Emil and Patricia Jones Convocation Center (769); Chicago, IL
02/24/2014*; 7:00 pm	at Eastern Illinois	L 62–84	11–16	Lantz Arena (1,252); Charleston, IL
02/27/2014; 9:00 pm	at Seattle	W 84–77 ^{3OT}	12–16 (7–6)	KeyArena (1,689); Seattle, WA
03/01/2014; 8:00 pm	at Grand Canyon	L 74–84	12–17 (7–7)	GCU Arena (4,888); Phoenix, AZ
03/06/2014; 7:05 pm	Idaho	L 76–79	12–18 (7–8)	Emil and Patricia Jones Convocation Center (926); Chicago, IL
03/08/2014; 2:05 pm	Seattle	W 67–53	13–18 (8–8)	Emil and Patricia Jones Convocation Center (1,283); Chicago, IL
WAC tournament
03/13/2014; 10:30 pm	vs. Cal State Bakersfield; Quarterfinals	L 62–68	13–19	Orleans Arena (1,188); Paradise, NV
*Non-conference game. ^{#}Rankings from AP Poll. (#) Tournament seedings in parentheses. All times are in Central.

== See also ==
- 2013–14 Chicago State Cougars women's basketball team
