= 2013–14 UMKC Kangaroos men's basketball team =

American college basketball season

2013–14 UMKC Kangaroos men's basketball
- Conference: Western Athletic Conference
- Record: 10–20 (7–9 WAC)
- Head coach: Kareem Richardson (1st season)
- Associate head coach: Angres Thorpe (1st season)
- Assistant coaches: Sean Bledsoe (1st season); Jason Sautter (1st season)
- Home arena: Municipal Auditorium, Independence Events Center, Swinney Recreation Center

2013–14 WAC men's basketball standings
	Conf.				Overall
Team	W		L	PCT	W		L	PCT
Utah Valley	13	–	3	.813	20	–	12	.625
New Mexico State †	12	–	4	.750	26	–	10	.722
Grand Canyon *	10	–	6	.625	15	–	15	.500
Chicago State	8	–	8	.500	13	–	19	.406
UMKC	7	–	9	.438	10	–	20	.333
Idaho	7	–	9	.438	16	–	17	.485
Cal State Bakersfield	5	–	11	.313	13	–	19	.406
Seattle	5	–	11	.313	13	–	17	.433
Texas–Pan American	5	–	11	.313	9	–	23	.281
† 2014 WAC tournament winner Rankings from AP poll * ineligible for postseason tournament as part of reclassification from NCAA Division II

The 2013–14 UMKC Kangaroos men's basketball team represented the University of Missouri–Kansas City during the 2013–14 NCAA Division I men's basketball season. The Kangaroos, led by first year head coach Kareem Richardson, played most of their home games off-campus, mainly at Municipal Auditorium (with two additional games at the Independence Events Center in Independence, Missouri) with one game on-campus at Swinney Recreation Center in Kansas City, Missouri as a member of the Western Athletic Conference (WAC). This was their first year as a member of the WAC.

They finished the season 10–20, 7–9 in WAC play to finish in a tie for fifth place. They were defeated in the WAC tournament quarterfinal by the University of Idaho.

== Previous season ==
The Kangaroos finished the 2012–13 season with a record of 8–24 overall, 5–11 in The Summit League to finish in seventh place.

== Roster ==
2013–14 UMKC Kangaroos men's basketball team
Players
Coaches

Pos.	#	Name	Height	Weight	Year	Previous school	Hometown
F/C	21	Fred Chatmon	6 ft 9 in (2.06 m)	230 lb (104 kg)	RS Sr	Garfield Heights HS	Cleveland, OH
F/C	44	Kirk Korver	6 ft 7 in (2.01 m)	220 lb (100 kg)	RS Sr	Pella HS	Pella, IA
F	23	Trinity Hall	6 ft 7 in (2.01 m)	210 lb (95 kg)	Sr	Wyandotte HS	Kansas City, KS
F	5	Reese Holliday (redshirt)	6 ft 4 in (1.93 m)	215 lb (98 kg)	Sr	Toledo; Sumner	Kansas City, KS
F/C	31	Caleb Johnson	6 ft 9 in (2.06 m)	215 lb (98 kg)	Sr	Yuba; El Camino Fundamental HS	Sacramento, CA
G/F	1	Nelson Kirksey	6 ft 3 in (1.91 m)	195 lb (88 kg)	Sr	Jacksonville; Middle Creek HS	Pittsburgh, PA
G	2	Aaron Washington	6 ft 0 in (1.83 m)	165 lb (75 kg)	Sr	Johnson County CC; Blue Valley Northwest HS	Kansas City, KS
F	22	Shayok Shayok (redshirt)	6 ft 8 in (2.03 m)	230 lb (104 kg)	Jr	Bradley; IMG/ Percy L. Julian HS/ St. Patrick's HS	Ottawa, Canada
G	13	Frank Williams, Jr.	6 ft 6 in (1.98 m)	175 lb (79 kg)	Jr	Indian Hills CC; Raytown Senior HS	Kansas City, MO
G	3	John Burke	6 ft 3 in (1.91 m)	205 lb (93 kg)	So	Hargrave Military/ North Springs HS	Atlanta, GA
G	4	Mason Wedel (redshirt)	6 ft 1 in (1.85 m)	180 lb (82 kg)	So	De Soto HS	Shawnee, KS
G	10	Jacobby Bledsoe	5 ft 10 in (1.78 m)	165 lb (75 kg)	Fr	Hamilton Southeastern HS	Fishers, IN
G	32	Jordan Brown	5 ft 10 in (1.78 m)	170 lb (77 kg)	Fr	IMG/ Effingham County HS	Savannah, GA
G	12	Martez Harrison	5 ft 11 in (1.8 m)	185 lb (84 kg)	Fr	Brewster/ University	Kansas City, MO
F/C	54	Isaac Kreuer	6 ft 10 in (2.08 m)	245 lb (111 kg)	Fr	Impact/ Metro	Harrisonville, MO
F	30	Chandler Levingston Simon	6 ft 6 in (1.98 m)	220 lb (100 kg)	Fr	St. John's Northwestern Military/ Adlai E. Stevenson HS	Vernon Hills, IL
F	35	Juan Ramon Rivas (redshirt)	6 ft 8 in (2.03 m)	200 lb (91 kg)	Fr	Olympia HS	Orlando, FL

Head coach

- Kareem Richardson (Evansville)

Assistant coach(es)

- Angres Thorpe (Saint Leo)
- Sean Bledsoe (Indianapolis)
- Jason Sautter (York (Nebraska))

Legend

- (C) Team captain
- (S) Suspended
- (I) Ineligible
- (W) Walk-on
- (5Y) Fifth-year Senior
- Injured
- Current redshirt

Roster
Last update: November 3, 2024

== Schedule & Results ==
Date time, TV	Rank^{#}	Opponent^{#}	Result	Record	High points	High rebounds	High assists	Site (attendance) city, state
Exhibition Season
November 1, 2013*; 7:05 PM		Rockhurst	W 95–80		21 – Williams, Jr.	9 – Chatmon	3 – Hall, Washington, Harrison	Municipal Auditorium (2,635); Kansas City, MO
Regular Season
November 8, 2013*; 3:05 PM, KSMO–TV		Emporia State	L 76–81	0–1	20 – Harrison	11 – Hall	4 – Harrison	Municipal Auditorium (1,502); Kansas City, MO
November 11, 2013*; 7:00 PM, FS1		at Creighton	L 70–96	0–2	15 – Hall	8 – Kreuer	4 – Kirksey	CenturyLink Center (16,859); Omaha, NE
November 13, 2013*; 7:00 PM		at Nebraska–Omaha	L 71–101	0–3	23 – Chatmon	9 – Chatmon	3 – Kirksey	Ralston Arena (1,363); Omaha, NE
November 20, 2013*; 7:00 PM		at Tennessee–Martin	W 79–67	1–3	20 – Chatmon, Harrison	12 – Chatmon	5 – Kirksey, Williams, Jr.	Kathleen and Tom; Elam Center (1,703); Martin, TN
November 25, 2013*; 7:00 PM		at No. 17 Iowa State	L 51–110	1–4	14 – Harrison	5 – Hall, Kreuer	3 – Harrison	James H. Hilton Coliseum (12,960); Ames, IA
November 30, 2013*; 7:05 PM		UW Milwaukee	L 79–84	1–5	28 – Harrison	5 – Kreuer	4 – Washington	Municipal Auditorium (1,325); Kansas City, MO
December 4, 2013*; 6:00 PM		at No. 7 Louisville	L 62–90	1–6	14 – Kirksey, Harrison	9 – Hall	2 – Bledsoe	KFC Yum! Center (20,269); Louisville, KY
December 7, 2013*; 12:05 PM		Youngstown State	W 88–80	2–6	24 – Kirksey	8 – Hall	8 – Harrison	Swinney Recreation Center (1,067); Kansas City, MO
December 14, 2013*; 2:05 PM, KSMO–TV		Indiana State	L 63–74	2–7	20 – Harrison	8 – Chatmon	1 – Hall, Johnson, Kirksey, Williams, Jr., Bledsoe, Harrison, Kreuer	Municipal Auditorium (2,496); Kansas City, MO
December 18, 2013*; 7:05 PM, KSMO–TV		Miami (Ohio)	W 69–55	3–7	13 – Kirksey	7 – Chatmon	5 – Kirksey	Municipal Auditorium (1,306); Kansas City, MO
December 21, 2013*; 6:00 PM		at Wright State	L 49–61	3–8	8 – Chatmon, Hall, Williams, Jr., Harrison	8 – Hall	3 – Williams, Jr.	Nutter Center (3,191); Fairborn, OH
December 28, 2013*; 7:05 PM, KSMO–TV		South Dakota State	L 60–65	3–9	16 – Kirksey	7 – Hall	4 – Harrison	Municipal Auditorium (1,557); Kansas City, MO
January 2, 2014; 9:00 PM		at Idaho	W 80–74	4–9 (1–0)	20 – Kirksey	10 – Hall	4 – Chatmon	Cowan Spectrum (1,021); Moscow, ID
January 4, 2014; 9:00 PM		at Seattle	W 95–84	5–9 (2–0)	25 – Kirksey	9 – Chatmon	7 – Harrison	KeyArena (2,537); Seattle, WA
January 11, 2014; 5:15 PM, KSMO–TV		Chicago State	L 66–68	5–10 (2–1)	17 – Kirksey	15 – Chatmon	5 – Harrison	Municipal Auditorium (2,023); Kansas City, MO
January 16, 2014; 7:05 PM, KSMO–TV		Texas–Pan American	L 66–78	5–11 (2–2)	17 – Harrison	11 – Chatmon	3 – Harrison	Municipal Auditorium (1,509); Kansas City, MO
January 18, 2014; 7:05 PM		New Mexico State	W 68–66	6–11 (3–2)	21 – Harrison	9 – Kirksey	7 – Harrison	Municipal Auditorium (1,526); Kansas City, MO
January 23, 2014; 8:05 PM		at Utah Valley	L 48–66	6–12 (3–3)	15 – Harrison	8 – Chatmon	3 – Williams, Jr., Harrison	UCCU Center (2,471); Orem, UT
January 25, 2014; 9:00 PM		at Cal State Bakersfield	W 70–69	7–12 (4–3)	19 – Harrison	8 – Chatmon	5 – Harrison	Jimmie and Marjorie; Icardo Center (1,223); Bakersfield, CA
January 29, 2014*; 7:00 PM		at Southeast Missouri State	L 81–91	7–13	14 – Harrison	10 – Chatmon	6 – Harrison	Show Me Center (1,583); Cape Girardeau, MO
February 1, 2014; 7:05 PM		Grand Canyon	L 53–72	7–14 (4–4)	17 – Harrison	6 – Chatmon, Hall	2 – Bledsoe	Municipal Auditorium (2,011); Kansas City, MO
February 8, 2014; 4:30 PM		at Chicago State	L 74–81	7–15 (4–5)	27 – Harrison	7 – Kirksey, Williams, Jr.	6 – Kirksey	Emil and Patricia; Jones Convocation Center (1,008); Chicago, IL
February 13, 2014; 8:00 PM, KSMO–TV		at New Mexico State	L 48–71	7–16 (4–6)	13 – Harrison	13 – Chatmon	2 – Kirksey	Pan American Center (5,111); Las Cruces, NM
February 15, 2014; 7:00 PM		at Texas–Pan American	L 59–68	7–17 (4–7)	12 – Hall	11 – Chatmon	3 – Korver, Williams, Jr.	UTPA Fieldhouse (1,302); Edinburg, TX
February 20, 2014; 7:05 PM		Cal State Bakersfield	L 69–74	7–18 (4–8)	20 – Harrison	11 – Harrison	7 – Harrison	Municipal Auditorium (2,027); Kansas City, MO
February 22, 2014; 7:05 PM		Utah Valley	W 74–56	8–18 (5–8)	24 – Harrison	8 – Harrison	4 – Harrison	Municipal Auditorium (2,232); Kansas City, MO
February 27, 2014; 8:00 PM, KSMO–TV		at Grand Canyon	W 85–80	9–18 (6–8)	31 – Harrison	7 – Chatmon	4 – Harrison	GCU Arena (4,611); Phoenix, AZ
March 6, 2014; 7:05 PM		Seattle	W 82–73	10–18 (7–8)	16 – Williams, Jr.	8 – Kirksey	4 – Kirksey	Independence Events Center (1,502); Independence, MO
March 8, 2014; 9:35 PM		Idaho	L 80–87	10–19 (7–9)	20 – Kirksey	7 – Kirksey	8 – Harrison	Independence Events Center (1,392); Independence, MO
Conference Tournament
March 13, 2014*; 4:30 PM	(4)	vs. (5) Idaho [Quarterfinal]	L 70–73	10–20	18 – Harrison	5 – Hall	7 – Harrison	Orleans Arena (1,028); Paradise, NV
*Non-conference game. ^{#}Rankings from AP Poll. (#) Tournament seedings in parentheses. All times are in Central Standard Time (CST).
