= 2014 WAC men's basketball tournament =

2014 Western Athletic Conference men's basketball tournament
- Classification: Division I
- Season: 2013–14
- Teams: 8
- Site: Orleans Arena; Paradise, Nevada
- Champions: New Mexico State (5th title)
- Winning coach: Marvin Menzies (4th title)
- MVP: Sim Bhullar (New Mexico State)
- Television: ESPNU

2013–14 WAC men's basketball standings
| | Conf. | | | | Overall |
| Team | W | | L | PCT | W | | L | PCT |
|---|---|---|---|---|---|---|---|---|
| Utah Valley | 13 | – | 3 | .813 | 20 | – | 12 | .625 |
| New Mexico State † | 12 | – | 4 | .750 | 26 | – | 10 | .722 |
| Grand Canyon * | 10 | – | 6 | .625 | 15 | – | 15 | .500 |
| Chicago State | 8 | – | 8 | .500 | 13 | – | 19 | .406 |
| UMKC | 7 | – | 9 | .438 | 10 | – | 20 | .333 |
| Idaho | 7 | – | 9 | .438 | 16 | – | 17 | .485 |
| Cal State Bakersfield | 5 | – | 11 | .313 | 13 | – | 19 | .406 |
| Seattle | 5 | – | 11 | .313 | 13 | – | 17 | .433 |
| Texas–Pan American | 5 | – | 11 | .313 | 9 | – | 23 | .281 |
† 2014 WAC tournament winner Rankings from AP poll * ineligible for postseason tournament as part of reclassification from NCAA Division II

The 2014 WAC men's basketball tournament was the postseason men's basketball tournament for the Western Athletic Conference, held from March 13–15, 2014 at the Orleans Arena in Paradise, Nevada, with the champion New Mexico State Aggies receiving an automatic bid into the 2014 NCAA tournament. This was the third consecutive year the WAC Tournament took place in Las Vegas.

== Format ==
Grand Canyon did not compete in the 2014 men's basketball tournament. As a D2 to D1 transitioning school, they are ineligible to compete in the NCAA tournament until the 2018 season, so they could not win the conference tournament since the winner received an automatic bid to the NCAA Tournament, in which they were ineligible to participate. However Grand Canyon was eligible to win the regular season title and was eligible to compete in the NIT, CIT, or CBI, had they been invited.

Eight teams competed in the 2014 tournament in a traditional single-elimination style tournament, with 1 playing 8, 2 playing 7, 3 playing 6, and 4 playing 5 on Thursday, March 13. The winners met in the semifinals on Friday, March 14 with the late game airing on an ESPN Network. The championship aired Saturday, March 15, also on an ESPN Network.

== Seeds ==
| Seed | School | Conference | Overall | Tiebreaker |
|---|---|---|---|---|
| 1 | Utah Valley | 13–3 | 19–10 | |
| 2 | New Mexico State | 12–4 | 23–9 | |
| 3 | Chicago State | 8–8 | 13–18 | |
| 4 | UMKC | 7–9 | 10–19 | 1–1 vs. Idaho; 1–1 vs. Utah V |
| 5 | Idaho | 7–9 | 14–17 | 1–1 vs. UMKC; 0–2 vs. Utah V |
| 6 | Cal State Bakersfield | 5–11 | 12–18 | 3–1 vs. Sea & TPA |
| 7 | Seattle | 5–11 | 13–16 | 2–2 vs. CSB & TPA |
| 8 | Texas–Pan American | 5–11 | 9–22 | 1–3 vs. CSB & Sea |

Overall record at the end of regular season

== Schedule ==
| Session | Game | Time* | Matchup^{#} |
Quarterfinals – Thursday, March 13
| 1 | 1 | 12:00 pm | #1 Utah Valley vs. #8 Texas–Pan American |
| 1 | 2 | 2:30 pm | #4 UMKC vs. #5 Idaho |
| 2 | 3 | 6:00 pm | #3 Chicago State vs. #6 Cal State Bakersfield |
| 2 | 4 | 8:30 pm | #2 New Mexico State vs. #7 Seattle |
Semifinals – Friday, March 14
| 3 | 5 | 6:00 pm | #1 Utah Valley vs. # 5 Idaho |
| 3 | 6 | 8:30 pm | #6 Cal State Bakersfield vs. #2 New Mexico State |
Championship – Saturday, March 15
| 4 | 7 | 7:00 pm | # 5 Idaho vs. #2 New Mexico State |
*Game times in PT. #-Rankings denote tournament seeding.

== Bracket ==
Quarterfinals; Thursday, March 13
1 | Utah Valley | 83
8 | Texas–Pan American | 63
4 | UMKC | 70
5 | Idaho | 73
2 | New Mexico State | 70
7 | Seattle | 68
3 | Chicago State | 62
6 | Cal State Bakersfield | 67

Semifinals; Friday, March 14
1 | Utah Valley | 69
5 | Idaho | 74
2 | New Mexico State | 69
6 | Cal State Bakersfield | 63

Championship; Saturday, March 15; ESPNU
5 | Idaho | 55
2 | New Mexico State | 77

== See also ==
- 2013-14 NCAA Division I men's basketball season
- WAC men's basketball tournament
