= Bhullarai =

- Village
- Location in Punjab, India Bhullarai (India)
- Coordinates: 31.243988°N 75.785112°E
- Country: India
- State: Punjab
- District: Kapurthala

Government
  - Type: Panchayati raj (India)
  - Body: Gram panchayat

Population (2011)
  - Total: 4,133
- Sex ratio 2136/1997♂/♀

Languages
  - Official: Punjabi
  - Other spoken: Hindi
- Time zone: UTC+5:30 (IST)
- PIN: 144401
- Telephone code: 01822
- ISO 3166 code: IN-PB
- Vehicle registration: PB-09
- Website: kapurthala.gov.in

Bhullarai is a village in Tehsil Phagwara, Kapurthala district, in Punjab, India. It is located 0.8 kilometres (0.50 mi) away from sub-district headquarter Phagwara and 43 km away from district headquarter Kapurthala. The village is administrated by a Sarpanch, who is an elected representative.

== Transport ==
Phagwara Junction Railway Station, Mandhali Railway Station are the nearby railway stations to Bhullarai. Jalandhar City Rail Way Station is 22 km away from the village. The village is 117 km away from Sri Guru Ram Dass Jee International Airport in Amritsar. Another nearby airport is Sahnewal Airport in Ludhiana which is located 44 km away from the village.
