= Mehal Singh Bhullar =

Indian police officer

Director General of Police Mehal Singh Bhullar I.P.S.
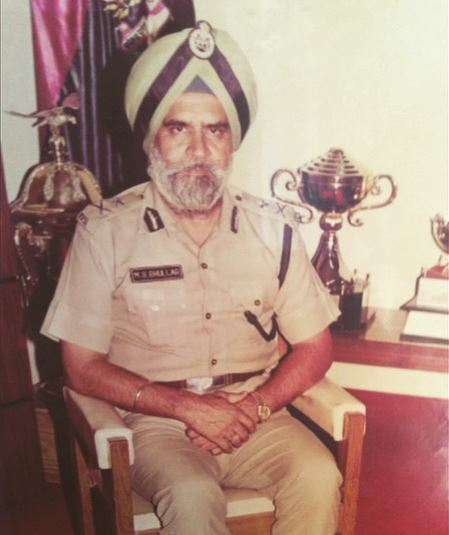
- Born: 1943 (age 82–83)
- Police career
- Country: India
- Allegiance: India
- Department: Punjab police
- Rank: Director General of Police
- Awards: President’s Police Medal for Meritorious Service

Major Mehal Singh Bhullar
- Spouse: Daljeet Kaur
- Military career
- Allegiance: India
- Branch: Indian Army
- Rank: Major
- Unit: 13th Battalion (Jind Infantry)Punjab Regiment
- Conflicts: Sino-Indian War, Mizoram Insurgency, India-Pakistan War of 1965

(Major) Mehal Singh Bhullar is a retired Indian Police Service officer who has served as the director general of the Punjab Police from 2002–2003.

== Early life and military career ==
He served in the Indian Army through an emergency (war) service commission with the 13th Punjab Regiment, ranking as a Major. He participated in the Sino-Indian War, the Indo-Pakistan War of 1965, and counter-insurgency operations in Mizoram during the 1960s.

== Career in Punjab Police ==
He is accredited with leading anti-insurgency operations in Punjab during the 1980–1990 period and for facilitating the unconditional surrender of several militants as Inspector General of Police, Border Range (Punjab). His usage of military experience in anti-insurgency operations gained him recognition. He spent many years of his service with the Punjab Armed Police, where he promoted a sports culture and played a seminal role in the establishment of the P.A.P. complex in Jalandhar and the Police D.A.V. School of Jalandhar.

== Contribution to sports ==
Bhullar is credited with facilitating many sportspersons in the Punjab Police, including WWE wrestler Daleep Singh Rana (The Great Khali). The Punjab Armed Police Indoor Stadium in Jalandhar is named in his honour.

== Personal life ==
Bhullar is married to Daljeet Kaur and has two sons. His eldest son, Harcharan Singh Bhullar, Police Medal (India) recipient, is an Indian Police Service officer serving in the Punjab Police as a Senior Superintendent of Police. His youngest son, Kuldeep Singh Bhullar, is a former politician who contested the Punjab Vidhan Sabha elections of 2002 from Zira as an Indian National Congress candidate.

== Other positions ==
Bhullar serves as the honorary lifetime president of the Punjab Volleyball Association.
