= Bhullar, Jalandhar =

Bhullar
- Village
- Location in Punjab, India Bhullar (India)
- Coordinates: 31.007°N 75.651°E
- Country: India
- State: Punjab
- District: Jalandhar
- Tehsil: Nakodar

Government
  - Type: Panchayat raj
  - Body: Gram panchayat

Area
  - Total: 237 ha (590 acres)

Population (2011)
  - Total: 901; 450/451 ♂/♀
  - Scheduled Castes: 281; 137/144 ♂/♀
  - Total Households: 191

Languages
  - Official: Punjabi
- Time zone: UTC+5:30 (IST)
- ISO 3166 code: IN-PB
- Website: jalandhar.gov.in

Bhullar is a village in Nakodar in Jalandhar district of Punjab State, India. It is located 8 kilometres (5.0 mi) from sub district headquarter and 30 kilometres (19 mi) from district headquarter. The village is administrated by Sarpanch an elected representative of the village.

== Demography ==
As of 2011, the village has a total number of 191 houses and a population of 901 of which 450 are males while 451 are females. According to the report published by Census India in 2011, out of the total population of the village 281 people are from Schedule Caste and the village does not have any Schedule Tribe population so far.

== See also ==
- List of villages in India
