= Bhullar, Kapurthala =

Village in Punjab state, India

Bhullar
- Village
- Location in Punjab, India Bhullar (India)
- Coordinates: 31.006276°N 75.650993°E
- Country: India
- State: Punjab
- District: Kapurthala

Government
  - Type: Panchayati raj (India)
  - Body: Gram panchayat

Population (2011)
  - Total: 873
- Sex ratio 459/414♂/♀

Languages
  - Official: Punjabi
  - Other spoken: Hindi
- Time zone: UTC+5:30 (IST)
- PIN: 144601
- Telephone code: 01822
- ISO 3166 code: IN-PB
- Vehicle registration: PB-09
- Website: kapurthala.gov.in

Bhullar is a village in Kapurthala district of Punjab State, India. It is located 12 kilometres (7.5 mi) from Kapurthala, which is both district and sub-district headquarters of Bhullar. The village is administrated by a Sarpanch who is an elected representative of village as per the constitution of India and Panchayati raj (India).

== Demography ==
According to the report published by Census India in 2011, Bhullar has a total number of 179 houses and population of 873 of which include 459 males and 414 females. Literacy rate of Bhullar is 76.56%, higher than state average of 75.84%. The population of children under the age of 6 years is 58 which is 6.64% of total population of Bhullar, and child sex ratio is approximately 813, lower than state average of 846.

== Population data ==
Particulars	Total	Male	Female
Total No. of Houses	179	-	-
Population	873	459	414
Child (0–6)	58	32	26
Schedule Caste	225	111	114
Schedule Tribe	0	0	0
Literacy	76.56 %	80.80 %	71.91 %
Total Workers	327	276	51
Main Worker	296	0	0
Marginal Worker	31	7	24

== Air travel connectivity ==
The closest airport to the village is Sri Guru Ram Dass Jee International Airport.
