= Sim Bhullar =

Canadian basketball player (born 1992)

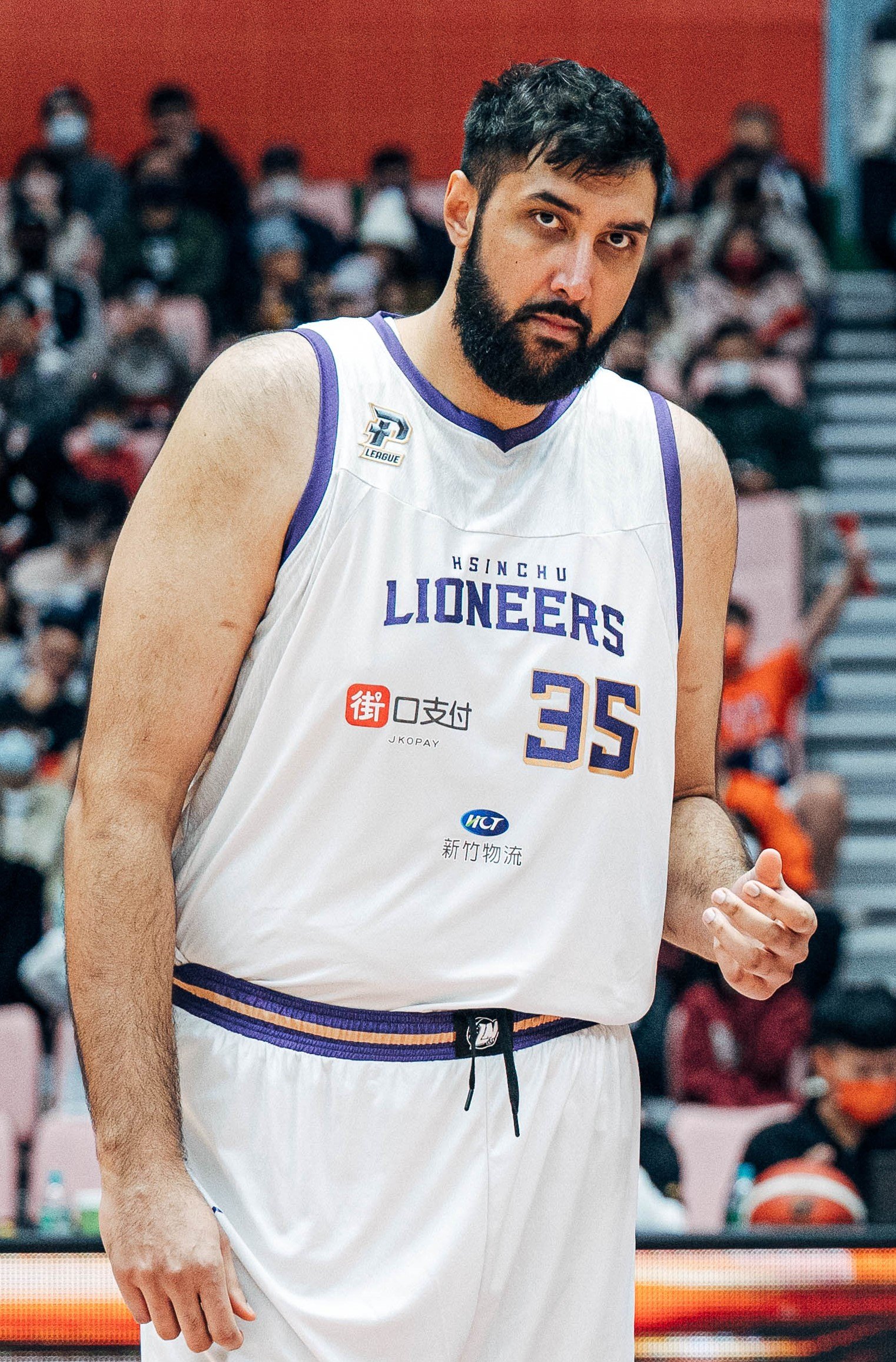
- Bhullar with the Hsinchu JKO Lioneers in 2022

No. 35 – Hsinchu Toplus Lioneers
- Position: Center
- League: Taiwan Professional Basketball League

Personal information
- Born: December 2, 1992 (age 33) Toronto, Ontario, Canada
- Listed height: 226 cm (7 ft 5 in)
- Listed weight: 140 kg (309 lb)

Career information
- High school: The Kiski School (Saltsburg, Pennsylvania); Huntington Prep School (Huntington, West Virginia)
- College: New Mexico State (2012–2014)
- NBA draft: 2014: undrafted
- Playing career: 2014–present

Career history
- 2014–2015: Reno Bighorns
- 2015: Sacramento Kings
- 2015–2016: Raptors 905
- 2016–2017: Dacin Tigers
- 2017: Guangxi Rhinos
- 2017–2018: Dacin Tigers
- 2019: Taipei Fubon Braves
- 2020: Yulon Luxgen Dinos
- 2021–2022: Hsinchu JKO Lioneers
- 2022–2024: Tainan TSG GhostHawks
- 2025–present: Hsinchu Toplus Lioneers

Career highlights
- SBL champion (2017); SBL Best Foreign Player of the year (2017); NBA D-League All-Rookie Third Team (2015); NBA D-League All-Defensive Second Team (2015); 2x WAC Tournament MVP (2013, 2014); Third-team All-WAC (2013); WAC All-Defensive Team (2014); WAC Freshman of the Year (2013)
- Stats at NBA.com
- Stats at Basketball Reference

Gursimrana Singh "Sim" Bhullar (born December 2, 1992) is a Canadian professional basketball player for the Hsinchu Toplus Lioneers of the Taiwan Professional Basketball League (TPBL). He played college basketball for New Mexico State University and is the first player of Indian descent to play in the NBA. At 7'5", he also became the sixth-tallest player in NBA history, being tied with Chuck Nevitt and Pavel Podkolzin for that record.

== High school career ==
Born in Toronto, Ontario, Bhullar grew up in Brampton and attended Father Henry Carr Catholic Secondary School in Etobicoke, Toronto before moving to Saltsburg, Pennsylvania, to attend The Kiski School for the 2009–10 school year. That year, Bhullar averaged a near triple-double for the Twin Falls Idaho basketball team with 16 points, 14 rebounds, and 8 blocks per game. At the FIBA Americas Under-13 tournament in the summer of 2010, Bhullar impressed with his size and performance. In a loss to the United States, Bhullar came off the bench to record 14 points, four rebounds and three blocks.

At the end of November 2010, in the middle of Kiski's basketball season, Bhullar withdrew from Kiski and transferred to Huntington Prep School in West Virginia. At Huntington, Bhullar improved on his conditioning, dropping from 367 pounds (166 kg) to 330 pounds (150 kg).

== College career ==
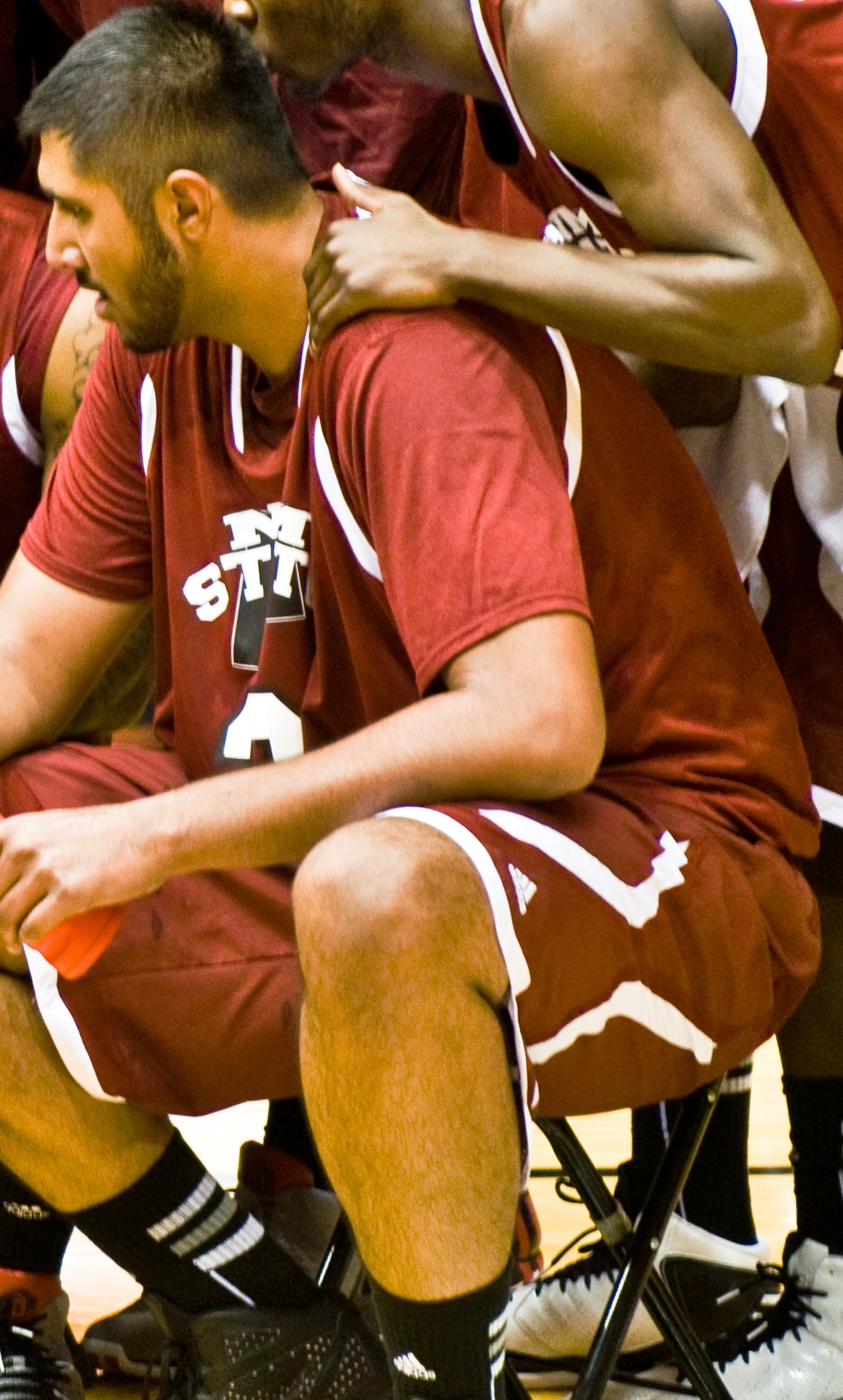
Bhullar in 2012.

Bhullar originally committed to playing for Xavier University in Cincinnati, Ohio, but decommitted in August 2011 to play for the New Mexico State Aggies. He turned down Xavier because he learned he was not qualified to immediately play and would have to pay the full $42,000-a-year tuition, which his family refused to do. Bhullar, however, was not able to play until the 2012–13 season because the NCAA denied him an eligibility waiver and rejected the school's appeal. His brother, Tanveer, joined the team for the 2013–14 season, although he redshirted his freshman year.

During his freshman season, Bhullar played 24.4 minutes per game, averaging 10.1 points, 6.7 rebounds, and 2.4 blocks per game. In his sophomore season, he improved to 26.3 minutes per game, with 10.4 points, 7.8 rebounds, and 3.4 blocks per game. He is a two-time WAC tournament MVP, winning the award in 2013 and 2014, where he also helped New Mexico State reach the NCAA tournament.

In April 2014, Bhullar declared for the NBA draft, forgoing his final two years of college eligibility.

== Professional career ==
=== Sacramento Kings / Reno Bighorns (2014–2015) ===
After going undrafted in the 2014 NBA draft, Bhullar joined the Sacramento Kings for the 2014 NBA Summer League. On August 14, 2014, he signed with the Kings, becoming the first player of Indian descent to sign with an NBA team. However, he was waived by the Kings on October 19 after appearing in two preseason games. On November 2, 2014, he was acquired by the Reno Bighorns of the NBA Development League as an affiliate player of the Kings. Bhullar made his D-League debut on December 6 and recorded four points, eight rebounds and six blocks in Reno's 141–140 loss to the Los Angeles D-Fenders. On February 22, 2015, he recorded his first career triple-double with 26 points, 17 rebounds and 11 blocked shots against the D-Fenders.

On April 2, 2015, Bhullar signed a 10-day contract with the Sacramento Kings. Five days later, he made history when he checked in the fourth quarter for the final 16.1 seconds of the Kings' 116–111 win over the Minnesota Timberwolves, becoming the first player of Indian descent to play in an NBA game. He scored his first two points on April 8 in a 103–91 loss to the Utah Jazz. Bhullar was not retained by the Kings following the expiration of his 10-day contract.

In July 2015, Bhullar re-joined the Kings for the 2015 NBA Summer League. After appearing in just one game for the Kings, Bhullar left the team in order to join the Canadian national team for the Pan Am Games.

=== Raptors 905 (2015–2016) ===
On October 31, 2015, Bhullar was acquired by Raptors 905 of the NBA Development League. In 39 games for Raptors 905 in 2015–16, he averaged 9.6 points, 6.9 rebounds, 1.1 assists and 1.3 blocks per game.

=== Dacin Tigers (2016–2017) ===
On August 26, 2016, Bhullar signed with the Dacin Tigers of the Taiwanese Super Basketball League.

=== Guangxi Rhinos (2017) ===
On April 27, 2017, Bhullar signed with Guangxi Rhinos of the National Basketball League, the second-tier league of China.

=== Hsinchu JKO Lioneers (2021–2022) ===
On October 22, 2021, Bhullar joined Hsinchu JKO Lioneers of the Taiwanese P. League+.

=== Tainan TSG GhostHawks (2022–2024) ===
On December 16, 2022, Bhullar signed with Tainan TSG GhostHawks of the T1 League. On August 7, 2023, Bhullar re-signed with the Tainan TSG GhostHawks. On March 9, 2024, the news reported that Tainan TSG GhostHawks cancelled the registration of Bhullar's playership.

=== Hsinchu Toplus Lioneers (2025–present) ===
On December 26, 2025, Bhullar returned to the Hsinchu Toplus Lioneers of the Taiwan Professional Basketball League (TPBL).

On March 9, 2026, Bhullar was not registered in the 2025–26 TPBL season final rosters. On August 12, Bhullar returned to the Hsinchu Toplus Lioneers of the Taiwan Professional Basketball League (TPBL).

== Career statistics ==
Legend
GP	Games played	GS	Games started	MPG	Minutes per game
FG%	Field goal percentage	3P%	3-point field goal percentage	FT%	Free throw percentage
RPG	Rebounds per game	APG	Assists per game	SPG	Steals per game
BPG	Blocks per game	PPG	Points per game	**Bold**	Career high

=== College ===
Year	Team	GP	GS	MPG	FG%	3P%	FT%	RPG	APG	SPG	BPG	PPG
2012–13	New Mexico State	**35**	**26**	24.4	.621	–	.465	6.7	.7	**.1**	2.4	10.1
2013–14	New Mexico State	30	24	**26.3**	**.648**	–	**.538**	**7.8**	**1.4**	**.1**	**3.4**	**10.4**
Career		65	50	25.3	.633	–	.496	7.2	1.0	.1	2.9	10.2

=== NBA ===
Year	Team	GP	GS	MPG	FG%	3P%	FT%	RPG	APG	SPG	BPG	PPG
2014–15	Sacramento	3	0	1.0	.500	–	–	.3	.3	.0	.3	.7

== National team career ==
Bhullar played for Canada in the 2010 FIBA Americas U18 Championship where he averaged 6.0 points and 3.8 rebounds in five games. Canada won the bronze medal after finishing with a 3–2 record. Bhullar then played for Canada in the 2011 FIBA Under-19 World Championship. In six games, he averaged 12.3 points and 6.3 rebounds per game. Canada finished in 11th place with a 3–5 record.

== Personal life ==
Bhullar's parents migrated to Canada from the state of Punjab in India. His father, Avtar, is 6 feet 4 inches (193 cm) and his mother, Varinder, is 5 feet 10 inches (178 cm). Neither parent had exposure to basketball until enrolling their sons into local youth basketball programs. Avtar himself grew up only playing kabaddi, a traditional Indian contact sport. Bhullar has an older sister, Avneet, who played women’s college basketball Duke University from 2009-2012, and a younger brother, Tanveer, who stands at 7 feet 2 inches (218 cm) and played college basketball for both New Mexico State and, later, Missouri State. In 2024 Bhullar married his high school sweetheart Joanna Lin.

== See also ==
- List of tallest players in National Basketball Association history
- List of Canadians in the National Basketball Association
