= Dignity Health Arena =

Indoor arena in Bakersfield, California

Coordinates: 35.37208°N 119.013723°W

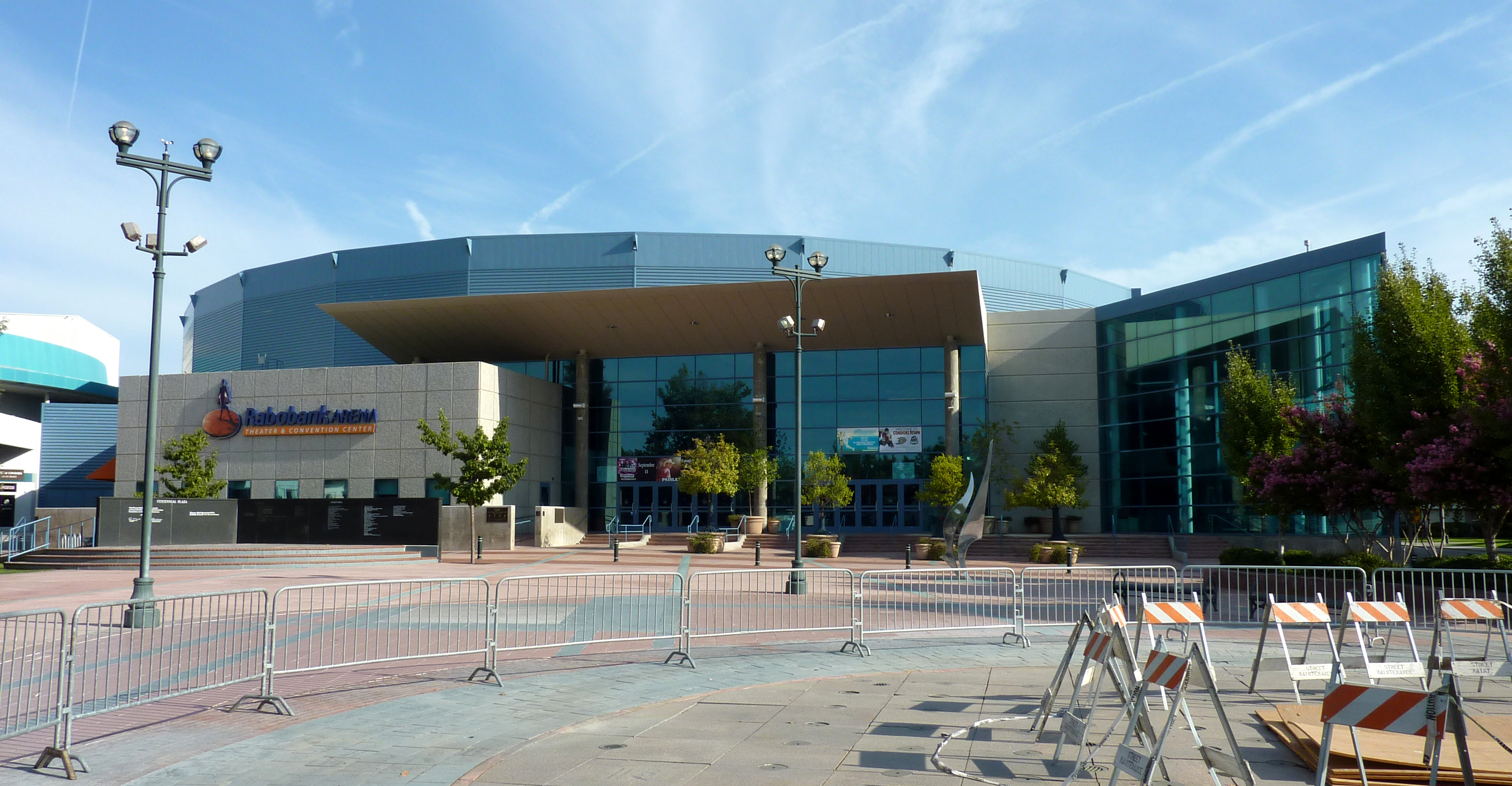
- Exterior view of the arena (c.2009)

- Location within California Location within the United States
- Former names: Centennial Garden (1998–2005); Rabobank Arena (2005–2019); Mechanics Bank Arena (2019–March 2025)
- Address: 1001 Truxtun Avenue
- Location: Bakersfield, California, U.S.
- Owner: City of Bakersfield
- Operator: ASM Global
- Capacity: 8,751

Construction
- Groundbreaking: June 9, 1997
- Opened: October 1, 1998
- Cost: $38 million ($76.2 million in 2025 dollars)
- Architect: Rossetti Architects
- Project manager: National Sports Services
- Structural engineers: Culp & Tanner
- Services engineer: ACCO Engineered Systems
- General contractor: PCL Construction

Tenants
- Cal State Bakersfield Roadrunners men's basketball (NCAA) (1998–2014); Bakersfield Condors (WCHL/ECHL) (1998–2015); Cal State Bakersfield Roadrunners women's basketball (NCAA) (2000–14); Bakersfield Blitz (AF2) (2002–03); Bakersfield Blitz (AF2) (2004–07); Bakersfield Jam (NBA D-League) (2006–09); Bakersfield Condors (AHL) (2015–present)

Website
- Venue Website

Dignity Health Arena is a multi-purpose arena in Bakersfield, California. Located downtown at the corner of Truxtun Avenue and N Street, it was built in 1998, and was originally known as Centennial Garden, a name submitted by local resident Brian Landis. Bay Area-based Mechanics Bank held the naming rights from September 2019, following their merger with Rabobank, N.A., which had held the naming rights since 2005.

In February 2025, the city of Bakersfield announced that Dignity Health bought the naming rights of the arena, which was renamed Dignity Health Arena, Theater and Convention Center on March 1, 2025, and set to run through December 31, 2035.

== About ==
The arena is home to the Bakersfield Condors, an ice hockey team in the American Hockey League. Mechanics Bank Arena is also the current home to the California Interscholastic Federation High School State Wrestling Championship Tournament held the first weekend in March. As a concert venue, the arena seats 6,400 for half-house shows and up to 10,225 for center stage and end-stage shows. The arena floor measures 17,000 square feet (1,600 m^{2}) of total space.

The southern concourse of Dignity Health Arena serves as the exhibit home of the Bob Elias Kern County Sports Hall of Fame. The Hall of Fame honors athletes and people involved with athletics from Bakersfield and Kern County. They include nationally prominent athletes, local coaches, and others who have made a significant contribution to athletics. A separate display on the western concourse honors the founders of Bakersfield and Kern County, as well as country music legend Buck Owens and current athletes and dignitaries from Bakersfield and Kern County.

Attached to the arena is the Dignity Health Theater and Convention Center, a 17,840-square-foot (1,657 m^{2}) exhibit hall and 3,000-seat theater. The complex was known as the Bakersfield Civic Auditorium when it opened in 1962 and was renamed the Bakersfield Convention Center in the 1980s.

In front of the arena is a city parkspace, Centennial Plaza. The Plaza has a large fountain, a stage, a sculpture fountain, art work, and bricks commemorating the City of Bakersfield's Centennial as an incorporated city in 1998. The community was founded in 1869 by Colonel Thomas Baker.

In their first year in the Western Athletic Conference (WAC), the Roadrunners men's and women's basketball teams moved into the Rabobank Arena (now Dignity Health Arena) full-time, but they moved back to campus for the 2014–15 season, though their former home court is still used today for Harlem Globetrotters games hosted at Dignity Health Arena. Also in recent years, ASM Global has taken over management of the Arena. The venue has hosted NCAA Division II Elite Eight tournaments, The California Interscholastic Federation State High School Wrestling Championship Tournament, PBR rodeos, monster truck shows, NHL and NBA pre-season games hosting the Los Angeles Lakers and Los Angeles Kings, World Wrestling Entertainment televised shows, the ECHL All-Star Game, an annual high school all-star football game played under Arena Football rules, conventions, Disney On Ice, Olympic Figure Skating Shows, and numerous concerts featuring musical acts of various genres, including The Eagles, hometown band Korn, and Brad Paisley.

On September 25, 1998, PCL Construction ceremoniously handed over the keys of the Centennial Garden Arena(original name) to the City Of Bakersfield, hosting the "PCL Construction Party" for construction workers, builders, architects, City Officials, family and friends, as Mayor "Bob" Price set the last tile to the wall in the foyer. Entertainment for the event was provided by the Wayne-Russell Band, featuring Ronnie Wayne and Billy Russell on guitar and vocals, Gary Branson on bass and vocals, and David Wulfekuehler of The Buckaroos on drums. This marked the band as the first entertainment to perform inside the arena. Bill Cosby was the first publicly ticketed entertainment inside, on October 2, 1998.

== See also ==
- List of NCAA Division I basketball arenas

Events and tenants
Preceded by Cox Convention Center (as the Oklahoma City Barons)	Home of the Bakersfield Condors; 2016–present	Succeeded by current
