= Tre'Shaun =

Tre'Shaun or Tre'shaun is an English-language masculine given name, a combination of the popular element tre and the name Shaun, which means "God is gracious". It is often found among African Americans. Notable people with the given name include:

- Tre'Shaun Fletcher (born 1994), American basketball player
- Tre'Shaun Harrison (born 2000), American football player
- Treshaun Ward (born 2001), American football player
- Tre Mann (born 2001), American basketball player
