= 2013–14 Colorado Buffaloes men's basketball team =

American college basketball season

2013–14 Colorado Buffaloes men's basketball

NCAA tournament, round of 64
- Conference: Pac-12 Conference
- Record: 23–12 (10–8 Pac–12)
- Head coach: Tad Boyle
- Assistant coaches: Jean Prioleau; Mike Rohn; Rodney Billups
- Home arena: Coors Events Center

2013–14 Pac-12 Conference men's basketball standings
	Conf.				Overall
Team	W		L	PCT	W		L	PCT
No. 4 Arizona	15	–	3	.833	33	–	5	.868
No. 20 UCLA †	12	–	6	.667	28	–	9	.757
Oregon	10	–	8	.556	24	–	10	.706
Colorado	10	–	8	.556	23	–	12	.657
Arizona State	10	–	8	.556	21	–	12	.636
Stanford	10	–	8	.556	23	–	13	.639
California	10	–	8	.556	21	–	14	.600
Utah	9	–	9	.500	21	–	12	.636
Washington	9	–	9	.500	17	–	15	.531
Oregon State	8	–	10	.444	16	–	16	.500
Washington State	3	–	15	.167	10	–	21	.323
USC	2	–	16	.111	11	–	21	.344
† Conference tournament winner Rankings from AP poll

The 2013–14 Colorado Buffaloes men's basketball team represented the University of Colorado in the 2013–14 NCAA Division I men's basketball season. Head coach Tad Boyle was in his fourth season at Colorado. They were members of the Pac-12 Conference and played their home games at the Coors Events Center. They were dismantled by Pittsburgh in the first round of the NCAA Tournament.

== Departures ==
Name	Number	Pos.	Height	Weight	Year	Hometown	Notes
Shane Harris-Tunks	15	C	6'11"	250	RS Junior	Liverpool, AUS	Injured
André Roberson	21	F	6'7"	210	Junior	San Antonio, TX	NBA draft
Sabatino Chen	23	G	6'4"	190	Senior	Louisville, CO	Graduated
Jeremy Adams	31	G	6'5"	220	RS Junior	Madison, MS	Transferred

== Recruits ==
College recruiting information
Name	Hometown	School	Height	Weight	Commit date
Tre'Shaun Fletcher; SF	Tacoma, WA	Lincoln High School	6 ft 6 in (1.98 m)	185 lb (84 kg)	Sep 29, 2012
Tre'Shaun Fletcher; SF	Recruit ratings: Scout: Rivals: (84)				
Jaron Hopkins; SG	Mesa, AZ	Dobson High School	6 ft 4 in (1.93 m)	185 lb (84 kg)	Sep 3, 2012
Jaron Hopkins; SG	Recruit ratings: Scout: Rivals: (79)				
Dustin Thomas; PF	Texarkana, TX	Pleasant Grove High School	6 ft 8 in (2.03 m)	210 lb (95 kg)	Sep 10, 2012
Dustin Thomas; PF	Recruit ratings: Scout: Rivals: (79)				
George King; SF	San Antonio, TX	William J. Brennan High School	6 ft 5 in (1.96 m)	205 lb (93 kg)	May 10, 2013
George King; SF	Recruit ratings: Scout: Rivals: (N/A)				
Overall recruit ranking: Scout: nr Rivals: nr ESPN: nr
Note: In many cases, Scout, Rivals, 247Sports, On3, and ESPN may conflict in their listings of height and weight.; In these cases, the average was taken. ESPN grades are on a 100-point scale.; Sources: "Colorado 2013 Basketball Commitments". Rivals.; "ESPN". ESPN.; "2013 Team Ranking". Rivals.

== Roster ==
2013–14 Colorado Buffaloes men's basketball team
Players
Coaches

Pos.	#	Name	Height	Weight	Year	Previous school	Hometown
G	0	Askia Booker	6 ft 2 in (1.88 m)	170 lb (77 kg)	Jr	Price HS	Los Angeles, CA
F	1	Wesley Gordon	6 ft 9 in (2.06 m)	225 lb (102 kg)	RS Fr	Sierra HS	Colorado Springs, CO
F	2	Xavier Johnson	6 ft 7 in (2.01 m)	220 lb (100 kg)	So	Mater Dei HS	Los Angeles, CA
G	3	Xavier Talton	6 ft 2 in (1.88 m)	180 lb (82 kg)	So	Sterling HS	Sterling, CO
G	5	Eli Stalzer	6 ft 3 in (1.91 m)	190 lb (86 kg)	So	Mater Dei HS	Santa Ana, CA
G/F	10	Tre'Shaun Fletcher	6 ft 7 in (2.01 m)	200 lb (91 kg)	Fr	Lincoln HS	Tacoma, WA
G	12	Kevin Nelson	6 ft 2 in (1.88 m)	185 lb (84 kg)	Sr	Albuquerque Academy	Albuquerque, NM
F	13	Dustin Thomas	6 ft 7 in (2.01 m)	220 lb (100 kg)	Fr	Pleasant Grove HS	Texarkana, TX
G	14	Beau Gamble	6 ft 0 in (1.83 m)	180 lb (82 kg)	RS Jr	Santa Clara; Fairview HS	Boulder, CO
G	15	Brett Brady (W)	6 ft 1 in (1.85 m)	160 lb (73 kg)	So	Highlands Ranch HS	Highlands Ranch, CO
G	23	Jaron Hopkins	6 ft 5 in (1.96 m)	190 lb (86 kg)	Fr	Dobson HS	Mesa, AZ
G/F	24	George King	6 ft 5 in (1.96 m)	208 lb (94 kg)	Fr	Brennan HS	San Antonio, TX
G	25	Spencer Dinwiddie (injured)	6 ft 6 in (1.98 m)	200 lb (91 kg)	Jr	Taft HS	Woodland Hills, CA
C	32	Ben Mills	7 ft 0 in (2.13 m)	230 lb (104 kg)	Sr	Arrowhead HS	Hartford, WI
G	35	Geoffrey Bates (injured) (W)	6 ft 3 in (1.91 m)	200 lb (91 kg)	Sr	Plano West HS	Plano, TX
F	40	Josh Scott	6 ft 10 in (2.08 m)	245 lb (111 kg)	So	Lewis-Palmer HS	Monument, CO

Head coach

- Tad Boyle (Kansas)

Assistant coach(es)

- Jean Prioleau (Fordham)
- Mike Rohn (McPherson)
- Rodney Billups (Denver)

Legend

- (C) Team captain
- (S) Suspended
- (I) Ineligible
- (W) Walk-on
- Injured
- Current redshirt

Roster
Last update: 12/13/13

=== Depth chart ===
Pos.	Starting 5	Bench 1	Bench 2
C	Josh Scott		Ben Mills
PF	Wesley Gordon
SF	Xavier Johnson	Dustin Thomas	George King
SG	Jaron Hopkins	Tre'Shaun Fletcher	Eli Stalzer
PG	Askia Booker	Xavier Talton	Beau Gamble

== Schedule and results ==
Date time, TV	Rank^{#}	Opponent^{#}	Result	Record	Site (attendance) city, state
Non-conference regular season
11/08/2013*; 8:00 pm, RTRM		vs. No. 25 Baylor; Buckets and Boots Showcase	L 60–72	0–1	American Airlines Center (5,207); Dallas, TX
11/10/2013*; 4:00 pm, P12N		Tennessee–Martin; Global Sports Main Event	W 94–65	1–1	Coors Events Center (8,408); Boulder, CO
11/13/2013*; 7:00 pm, P12N		Wyoming; Global Sports Main Event	W 63–58	2–1	Coors Events Center (9,429); Boulder, CO
11/16/2013*; 10:00 am, P12N		Jackson State; Global Sports Main Event	W 94–70	3–1	Coors Events Center (9,042); Boulder, CO
11/18/2013*; 7:00 pm, P12N		Arkansas State; Global Sports Main Event	W 93–70	4–1	Coors Events Center (8,204); Boulder, CO
11/21/2013*; 6:00 pm, P12N		UC Santa Barbara	W 76–68	5–1	Coors Events Center (8,488); Boulder, CO
11/24/2013*; 2:30 pm, ESPNU		Harvard	W 70–62	6–1	Coors Events Center (9,770); Boulder, CO
11/30/2013*; 2:00 pm		at Air Force	W 81–57	7–1	Clune Arena (5,394); Colorado Springs, CO
12/03/2013*; 7:00 pm, ESPN3		at Colorado State	W 67–62	8–1	Moby Arena (8,268); Fort Collins, CO
12/07/2013*; 1:15 pm, ESPN2		No. 6 Kansas	W 75–72	9–1	Coors Events Center (11,113); Boulder, CO
12/13/2013*; 6:30 pm, P12N	No. 21	Elon	W 80–63	10–1	Coors Events Center (8,831); Boulder, CO
12/21/2013*; 9:30 pm, ESPN2	No. 20	vs. No. 7 Oklahoma State; MGM Grand Showcase	L 73–78	10–2	MGM Grand Garden Arena (5,207); Paradise, NV
12/28/2013*; 8:00 pm, P12N	No. 21	Georgia	W 84–70	11–2	Coors Events Center (10,848); Boulder, CO
Pac-12 regular season
01/02/2014; 8:00 pm, ESPNU	No. 20	Oregon State	W 64–58	12–2 (1–0)	Coors Events Center (9,851); Boulder, CO
01/05/2014; 3:00 pm, FS1	No. 20	No. 10 Oregon	W 100–91	13–2 (2–0)	Coors Events Center (10,398); Boulder, CO
01/08/2014; 7:00 pm, P12N	No. 15	vs. Washington State	W 71–70 ^{OT}	14–2 (3–0)	Spokane Arena (3,122); Spokane, WA
01/12/2014; 1:00 pm, FS1	No. 15	at Washington	L 54–71	14–3 (3–1)	Alaska Airlines Arena (6,742); Seattle, WA
01/16/2014; 6:00 pm, P12N	No. 21	No. 25 UCLA	L 56–69	14–4 (3–2)	Coors Events Center (10,802); Boulder, CO
01/18/2014; 12:00 pm, FS1	No. 21	USC	W 83–62	15–4 (4–2)	Coors Events Center (9,583); Boulder, CO
01/23/2014; 7:00 pm, ESPN2		at No. 1 Arizona	L 57–69	15–5 (4–3)	McKale Center (14,545); Tucson, AZ
01/25/2014; 5:00 pm, P12N		at Arizona State	L 51–72	15–6 (4–4)	Wells Fargo Arena (8,352); Tempe, AZ
02/01/2014; 12:00 pm, P12N		Utah	W 79–75	16–6 (5–4)	Coors Events Center (9,607); Boulder, CO
02/05/2014; 7:30 pm, P12N		Washington State	W 68–63	17–6 (6–4)	Coors Events Center (8,903); Boulder, CO
02/09/2014; 6:00 pm, ESPNU		Washington	W 91–65	18–6 (7–4)	Coors Events Center (9,461); Boulder, CO
02/13/2014; 7:00 pm, ESPN2		at UCLA	L 74–92	18–7 (7–5)	Pauley Pavilion (8,431); Los Angeles, CA
02/16/2014; 6:00 pm, ESPNU		at USC	W 83–74	19–7 (8–5)	Galen Center (3,187); Los Angeles, CA
02/19/2014; 9:00 pm, ESPNU		Arizona State	W 61–52	20–7 (9–5)	Coors Events Center (9,666); Boulder, CO
02/22/2014; 7:00 pm, ESPN		No. 4 Arizona; College GameDay	L 61–88	20–8 (9–6)	Coors Events Center (11,025); Boulder, CO
03/01/2014; 12:00 pm, P12N		at Utah	L 64–75	20–9 (9–7)	Jon M. Huntsman Center (12,027); Salt Lake City, UT
03/05/2014; 7:00 pm, ESPN2		at Stanford	W 59–56	21–9 (10–7)	Maples Pavilion (4,558); Stanford, CA
03/08/2014; 4:30 pm, P12N		at California	L 65–66 ^{OT}	21–10 (10–8)	Haas Pavilion (9,422); Berkeley, CA
Pac-12 tournament
03/12/2014; 3:30 pm, P12N		vs. USC; First round	W 59–56	22–10	MGM Grand Garden Arena (8,734); Paradise, NV
03/13/2014; 3:30 pm, P12N		vs. California; Quarterfinals	W 59–56	23–10	MGM Grand Garden Arena (12,916); Paradise, NV
03/14/2014; 6:00 pm, P12N		vs. No. 4 Arizona; Semifinals	L 43–63	23–11	MGM Grand Garden Arena (12,916); Paradise, NV
NCAA tournament
03/20/2014*; 11:40 am, TBS	No. (8 S)	vs. (9 S) Pittsburgh; Second round	L 48–77	23–12	Amway Center (16,074); Orlando, FL
*Non-conference game. ^{#}Rankings from Coaches' Poll. (#) Tournament seedings in parentheses. All times are in Mountain Time. During NCAA Tournament (#) denotes seed within region S=South.

== Rankings ==
Ranking movement Legend: ██ Increase in ranking. ██ Decrease in ranking.
Poll	Pre	Wk 2	Wk 3	Wk 4	Wk 5	Wk 6	Wk 7	Wk 8	Wk 9	Wk 10	Wk 11	Wk 12	Wk 13	Wk 14	Wk 15	Wk 16	Wk 17	Wk 18	Wk 19	Final
AP	RV	RV	RV	RV	RV	21	20	21	20	15	21	RV	NR	NR	NR	NR	NR	RV	NR	N/A
Coaches	RV	RV	RV	RV	RV	RV	24	24	24	17	22	RV	RV	NR	RV	NR	NR	NR	NR	NR

== See also ==
2013–14 Colorado Buffaloes women's basketball team
