= 2013–14 Oregon Ducks men's basketball team =

American college basketball season

2013–14 Oregon Ducks men's basketball

NCAA tournament, Round of 32
- Conference: Pac-12 Conference
- Record: 24–10 (10–8 Pac-12)
- Head coach: Dana Altman
- Assistant coaches: Brian Fish; Kevin McKenna; Tony Stubblefield
- Home arena: Matthew Knight Arena

2013–14 Pac-12 Conference men's basketball standings
	Conf.				Overall
Team	W		L	PCT	W		L	PCT
No. 4 Arizona	15	–	3	.833	33	–	5	.868
No. 20 UCLA †	12	–	6	.667	28	–	9	.757
Oregon	10	–	8	.556	24	–	10	.706
Colorado	10	–	8	.556	23	–	12	.657
Arizona State	10	–	8	.556	21	–	12	.636
Stanford	10	–	8	.556	23	–	13	.639
California	10	–	8	.556	21	–	14	.600
Utah	9	–	9	.500	21	–	12	.636
Washington	9	–	9	.500	17	–	15	.531
Oregon State	8	–	10	.444	16	–	16	.500
Washington State	3	–	15	.167	10	–	21	.323
USC	2	–	16	.111	11	–	21	.344
† Conference tournament winner Rankings from AP poll

The 2013–14 Oregon Ducks men's basketball team represented the University of Oregon during the 2013–14 NCAA Division I men's basketball season. The Ducks, led by their fourth year head coach Dana Altman, were members of the Pac-12 Conference and played their home games at Matthew Knight Arena.

== Departures ==
Name	Number	Pos.	Height	Weight	Year	Hometown	Notes
Tony Woods	55	C	6'11"	243	Senior	Rome, Georgia	Graduated
Arsalan Kazemi	14	F	6'7"	226	Senior	Isfahan, Iran	Graduated
E. J. Singler	25	F	6'6"	215	Senior	Medford, Oregon	Graduated
Carlos Emory	33	F/G	6'5"	205	Senior	Bloomington, Minnesota	Graduated
Austin Kuemper	40	C	6'9"	225	Sophomore	Portland, Oregon	Elected to transfer.
Fred Richardson III	5	G	6'4"	202	Freshman	Houston, Texas	Elected to transfer.
Willie Moore	24	G	6'3"	199	Freshman	Cincinnati, Ohio	Elected to transfer.

== Incoming transfers ==
Name	Number	Pos.	Height	Weight	Year	Hometown	Notes
Mike Moser	43	F	6'8"	210	Senior	Portland, Oregon	Forwent senior season at UNLV to play his last year at Oregon. Since Moser already graduated from UNLV, he will be eligible to play immediately.
Jalil Abdul-Bassit	15	SF	6'5"		Junior	Anchorage, AK	Transferred from North Idaho College.
Elgin Cook	23	SF	6'6"		Junior	Milwaukee, WI	Transferred from Northwest Florida State College.
Joe Young	3	G	6'3"	185	RS Junior	Houston, TX	Transferred from University of Houston, appealing for eligibility.

== Recruiting class ==
College recruiting information
Name	Hometown	School	Height	Weight	Commit date
Jordan Bell; PF	Long Beach, CA	Long Beach Polytechnic High School	6 ft 7 in (2.01 m)	190 lb (86 kg)	Nov 13, 2012
Jordan Bell; PF	Recruit ratings: Scout: Rivals: (84)				
A.J. Lapray; SF	Salem, OR	Sprague High School	6 ft 5 in (1.96 m)	185 lb (84 kg)	Nov 15, 2012
A.J. Lapray; SF	Recruit ratings: Scout: Rivals: (70)				
Overall recruit ranking:
Note: In many cases, Scout, Rivals, 247Sports, On3, and ESPN may conflict in their listings of height and weight.; In these cases, the average was taken. ESPN grades are on a 100-point scale.; Sources: "2013 Team Ranking". Rivals.

== Roster ==
2013–14 Oregon Ducks men's basketball team
Players
Coaches

Pos.	#	Name	Height	Weight	Year	Hometown
F	0	Mike Moser	6 ft 8 in (2.03 m)	211 lb (96 kg)	RS Sr	Portland, Oregon
G	1	Dominic Artis	6 ft 1 in (1.85 m)	186 lb (84 kg)	So	Oakland, California
G	3	Joe Young	6 ft 2 in (1.88 m)	185 lb (84 kg)	RS Jr	Houston, Texas
G	4	Nicholas Lucenti (W)	6 ft 2 in (1.88 m)	205 lb (93 kg)	Sr	Los Angeles, California
F	5	Jordan Bell (redshirt)	6 ft 8 in (2.03 m)	225 lb (102 kg)	Fr	Long Beach, California
G	10	Johnathan Loyd	5 ft 8 in (1.73 m)	163 lb (74 kg)	Sr	Las Vegas, Nevada
G	11	Theo Friedman (W)	6 ft 1 in (1.85 m)	172 lb (78 kg)	Fr	Portland, Oregon
G	12	Jason Calliste	6 ft 1 in (1.85 m)	171 lb (78 kg)	RS Sr	Scarborough, Ontario
F	13	Richard Amardi	6 ft 8 in (2.03 m)	224 lb (102 kg)	RS Sr	Toronto, Ontario
G	15	Jalil Abdul-Bassit	6 ft 4 in (1.93 m)	187 lb (85 kg)	Jr	Anchorage, Alaska
C	20	Waverly Austin	6 ft 11 in (2.11 m)	257 lb (117 kg)	Sr	Fredericksburg, Virginia
G	21	Damyean Dotson	6 ft 5 in (1.96 m)	209 lb (95 kg)	So	Houston, Texas
F	23	Elgin Cook	6 ft 6 in (1.98 m)	206 lb (93 kg)	RS So	Milwaukee, Wisconsin
G	24	A.J. Lapray	6 ft 5 in (1.96 m)	187 lb (85 kg)	Fr	Salem, Oregon
F	32	Ben Carter	6 ft 8 in (2.03 m)	220 lb (100 kg)	So	Las Vegas, Nevada
F	35	Brian Crow (W)	6 ft 6 in (1.98 m)	220 lb (100 kg)	Jr	Novato, California

Head coach

- Dana Altman (Eastern New Mexico)

Assistant coach(es)

- Brian Fish (Marshall)
- Kevin McKenna (Creighton)
- Tony Stubblefield (Omaha)

Legend

- (C) Team captain
- (S) Suspended
- (I) Ineligible
- (W) Walk-on
- Injured
- Current redshirt

Roster
Last update: 12/14/13

=== Depth chart ===
Pos.	Starting 5	Bench 1	Bench 2	Bench 3
C	Waverly Austin	Richard Amardi
PF	Mike Moser	Ben Carter	Brian Crow
SF	Damyean Dotson	Elgin Cook	Jalil Abdul-Bassit
SG	Joe Young	Jason Calliste	Nicholas Lucenti	AJ Lapray
PG	Johnathan Loyd	Dominic Artis	Theo Friedman

== Schedule ==
Date time, TV	Rank^{#}	Opponent^{#}	Result	Record	Site (attendance) city, state
Exhibition
10/27/2013*; 5:00 pm, P12N	No. 19	Northwest Christian	W 99–59	–	Matthew Knight Arena (6,243); Eugene, OR
11/02/2013*; 2:00 pm	No. 19	Point Loma Nazarene	W 68–52	–	Matthew Knight Arena (5,587); Eugene, OR
Non-conference regular season
11/08/2013*; 5:00 pm, ESPN	No. 19	vs. Georgetown; Armed Forces Classic	W 82–75	1–0	Camp Humphreys (2,100); Pyeongtaek, SKR
11/13/2013*; 8:00 pm, P12N	No. 18	Western Carolina	W 107–83	2–0	Matthew Knight Arena (6,262); Eugene, OR
11/19/2013*; 6:00 pm, P12N	No. 17	Utah Valley	W 69–54	3–0	Matthew Knight Arena (5,717); Eugene, OR
11/24/2013*; 5:00 pm, P12N	No. 17	San Francisco	W 100–82	4–0	Matthew Knight Arena (6,084); Eugene, OR
11/29/2013*; 12:00 pm, P12N	No. 14	Pacific; Global Sports Hardwood Challenge	W 85–62	5–0	Matthew Knight Arena (5,719); Eugene, OR
11/30/2013*; 3:30 pm, P12N	No. 14	North Dakota; Global Sports Hardwood Challenge	W 91–76	6–0	Matthew Knight Arena (5,937); Eugene, OR
12/01/2013*; 7:00 pm, P12N	No. 14	Cal Poly; Global Sports Hardwood Challenge	W 82–61	7–0	Matthew Knight Arena (5,580); Eugene, OR
12/08/2013*; 2:00 pm, ESPNU	No. 13	at Ole Miss	W 115–105 ^{OT}	8–0	Tad Smith Coliseum (8,212); Oxford, MS
12/14/2013*; 6:00 pm, ESPN2	No. 13	vs. Illinois	W 71–64	9–0	Moda Center (10,043); Portland, OR
12/17/2013*; 7:30 pm, P12N	No. 13	UC Irvine	W 91–63	10–0	Matthew Knight Arena (5,958); Eugene, OR
12/21/2013*; 7:30 pm, P12N	No. 13	BYU	W 100–96 ^{OT}	11–0	Matthew Knight Arena (8,035); Eugene, OR
12/29/2013*; 12:00 pm, P12N	No. 12	Morgan State	W 97–76	12–0	Matthew Knight Arena (6,586); Eugene, OR
Pac-12 regular season
01/02/2014; 5:00 pm, P12N	No. 10	at Utah	W 70–68 ^{OT}	13–0 (1–0)	Huntsman Center (13,426); Salt Lake City, UT
01/05/2014; 2:00 pm, FS1	No. 10	at No. 20 Colorado	L 91–100	13–1 (1–1)	Coors Events Center (10,398); Boulder, CO
01/09/2014; 8:00 pm, FS1	No. 17	California	L 83–96	13–2 (1–2)	Matthew Knight Arena (8,415); Eugene, OR
01/12/2014; 2:00 pm, FS1	No. 17	Stanford	L 80–82	13–3 (1–3)	Matthew Knight Arena (8,852); Eugene, OR
01/19/2014; 5:00 pm, ESPNU		at Oregon State; Civil War	L 72–80	13–4 (1–4)	Gill Coliseum (6,358); Corvallis, OR
01/23/2014; 8:00 pm, FS1		at Washington	L 76–80	13–5 (1–5)	Alaska Airlines Arena (6,748); Seattle, WA
01/26/2014; 4:00 pm, P12N		at Washington State	W 71–44	14–5 (2–5)	Beasley Coliseum (3,866); Pullman, WA
01/30/2014; 6:00 pm, ESPN2		UCLA	L 68–70	14–6 (2–6)	Matthew Knight Arena (8,766); Eugene, OR
02/01/2014; 5:00 pm, P12N		USC	W 78–66	15–6 (3–6)	Matthew Knight Arena (11,178); Eugene, OR
02/06/2014; 6:00 pm, ESPN		at No. 2 Arizona	L 65–67	15–7 (3–7)	McKale Center (14,545); Tucson, AZ
02/08/2014; 2:00 pm, FS1		at Arizona State	L 72–74	15–8 (3–8)	Wells Fargo Arena (8,583); Temple, AZ
02/16/2014; 12:00 pm, FS1		Oregon State; Civil War	W 83–73	16–8 (4–8)	Matthew Knight Arena (10,013); Eugene, OR
02/19/2014; 6:00 pm, ESPN2		Washington	W 78–71	17–8 (5–8)	Matthew Knight Arena (6,792); Eugene, OR
02/23/2014; 6:00 pm, P12N		Washington State	W 67–53	18–8 (6–8)	Matthew Knight Arena (8,702); Eugene, OR
02/27/2014; 6:00 pm, ESPN2		at UCLA	W 87–83 ^{2OT}	19–8 (7–8)	Pauley Pavilion (8,643); Los Angeles, CA
03/01/2014; 1:00 pm, P12N		at USC	W 78–63	20–8 (8–8)	Galen Center (4,781); Los Angeles, CA
03/04/2014; 8:00 pm, FS1		Arizona State	W 85–78	21–8 (9–8)	Matthew Knight Arena (9,125); Eugene, OR
03/08/2014; 1:00 pm, CBS		No. 3 Arizona	W 64–57	22–8 (10–8)	Matthew Knight Arena (12,364); Eugene, OR
Pac-12 tournament
03/12/2014; 6:00 pm, P12N	(7)	vs. (10) Oregon State; First round	W 88–74	23–8	MGM Grand Garden Arena (9,047); Paradise, NV
03/13/2014; 6:00 pm, P12N	(7)	vs. (2) UCLA; Quarterfinals	L 63–82	23–9	MGM Grand Garden Arena (12,916); Paradise, NV
NCAA tournament
03/20/2014*; 12:10 pm, TruTV	(7 W)	vs. (10 W) BYU; Second round	W 87–68	24–9	BMO Harris Bradley Center (17,749); Milwaukee, WI
03/22/2014*; 4:45 pm, CBS	(7 W)	vs. (2 W) No. 12 Wisconsin; Third round	L 77–85	24–10	BMO Harris Bradley Center (18,206); Milwaukee, WI
*Non-conference game. ^{#}Rankings from AP Poll, (#) during NCAA Tournament is seed within region, W=West.. (#) Tournament seedings in parentheses. All times are in Pacific Time.

== See also ==
2013–14 Oregon Ducks women's basketball team

== Notes ==
- April 12, 2014 – Guard A.J. Lapray and forward Ben Carter will transfer

== Rankings ==
Ranking movement Legend: ██ Increase in ranking. ██ Decrease in ranking.
Poll	Pre	Wk 2	Wk 3	Wk 4	Wk 5	Wk 6	Wk 7	Wk 8	Wk 9	Wk 10	Wk 11	Wk 12	Wk 13	Wk 14	Wk 15	Wk 16	Wk 17	Wk 18	Wk 19	Wk 20	Final
AP	18	18	17	14	13	15	13	12	10	17	RV	NR	NR	NR	NR	NR	NR	NR	RV	RV	N/A
Coaches	19	18	17	15	13	11	11	10	9	13т	RV	RV	NR	NR	NR	NR	NR	NR	RV	NR	RV
