= 2013–14 Washington Huskies men's basketball team =

American college basketball season

2013–14 Washington Huskies men's basketball
- Conference: Pac-12 Conference
- Record: 17–15 (9–9 Pac-12)
- Head coach: Lorenzo Romar
- Assistant coaches: Brad Jackson; Raphael Chilleous; T. J. Otzelberger
- Home arena: Alaska Airlines Arena

2013–14 Pac-12 Conference men's basketball standings
	Conf.				Overall
Team	W		L	PCT	W		L	PCT
No. 4 Arizona	15	–	3	.833	33	–	5	.868
No. 20 UCLA †	12	–	6	.667	28	–	9	.757
Oregon	10	–	8	.556	24	–	10	.706
Colorado	10	–	8	.556	23	–	12	.657
Arizona State	10	–	8	.556	21	–	12	.636
Stanford	10	–	8	.556	23	–	13	.639
California	10	–	8	.556	21	–	14	.600
Utah	9	–	9	.500	21	–	12	.636
Washington	9	–	9	.500	17	–	15	.531
Oregon State	8	–	10	.444	16	–	16	.500
Washington State	3	–	15	.167	10	–	21	.323
USC	2	–	16	.111	11	–	21	.344
† Conference tournament winner Rankings from AP poll

The 2013–14 Washington Huskies men's basketball team represented the University of Washington in the 2013–14 NCAA Division I men's basketball season. The Huskies were led by twelfth-year head coach Lorenzo Romar. They played their home games at Alaska Airlines Arena at Hec Edmundson Pavilion as members of the Pac-12 Conference.

== Departures ==
Name	Number	Pos.	Height	Weight	Year	Hometown	Reason for departure
Aziz N'Diaye	5	C	7'0"	260	Senior	Dakar, SEG	Graduated
Scott Suggs	15	SG	6'6"	195	RS senior	Washington, MO	Graduated
Abdul Gaddy	0	PG	6'3"	195	Senior	Tacoma, WA	Graduated
Martin Breunig	10	F	6'8"	210	Junior	Leverkusen, Germany	Transferred to Montana
Hikeem Stewart	4	G	6'2"	185	Junior	Seattle, WA	Elected to transfer five games into the season

== Recruits ==
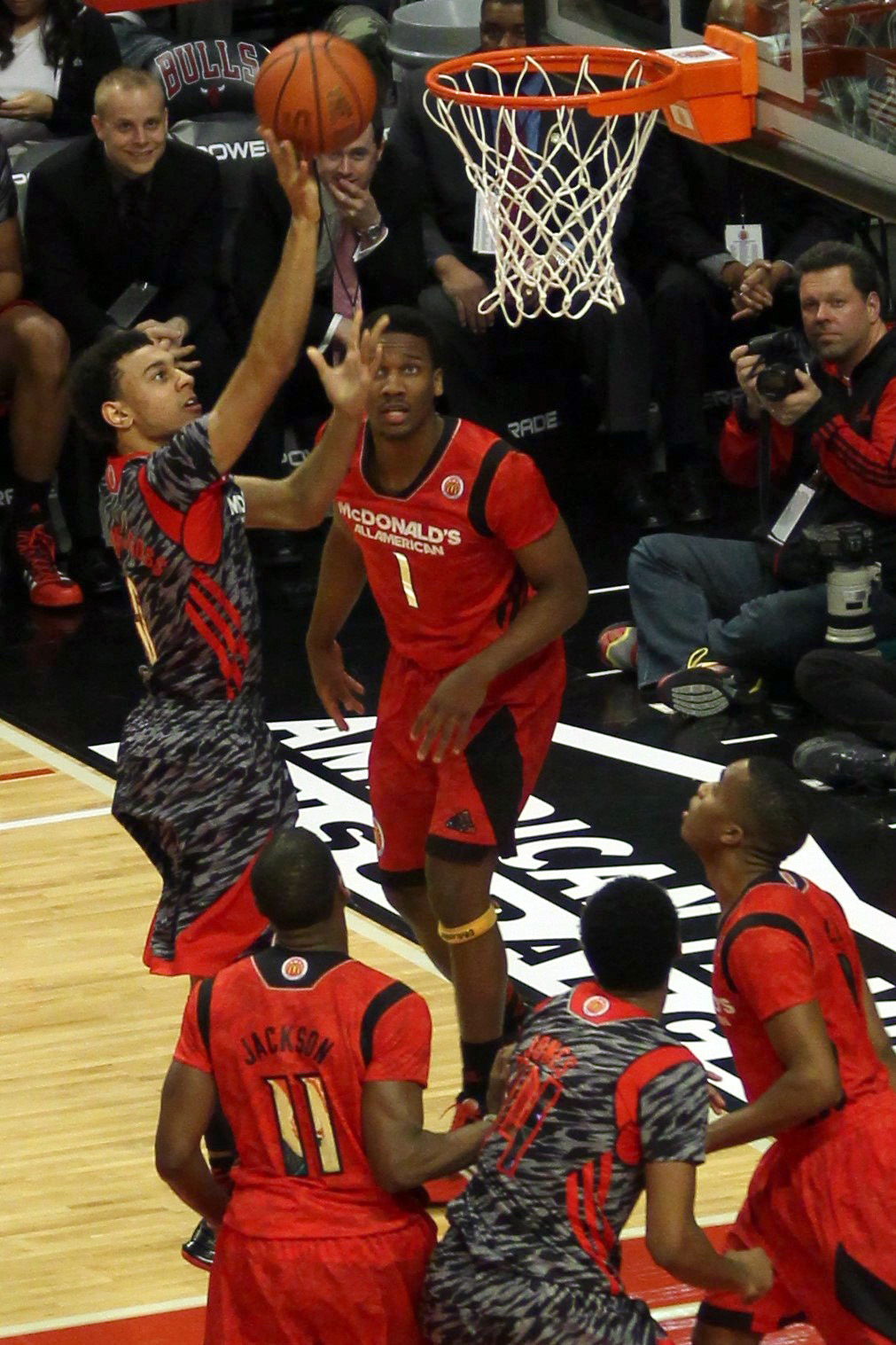
Nigel Williams-Goss in the 2013 McDonald's All-American Boys Game

College recruiting
Name	Hometown	School	Height	Weight	Commit date
Nigel Williams-Goss; PG	Happy Valley, OR	The Henderson International School	6 ft 3 in (1.91 m)	180 lb (82 kg)	May 29, 2012
Nigel Williams-Goss; PG	Recruit ratings: Scout: Rivals: (91)				
Darin Johnson; SG	Sacramento, CA	Sheldon High School	6 ft 4 in (1.93 m)	190 lb (86 kg)	Oct 14, 2012
Darin Johnson; SG	Recruit ratings: Scout: Rivals: (79)				
Jahmel Taylor; PG	Los Angeles, CA	Pacific Hills	5 ft 11 in (1.80 m)	160 lb (73 kg)	Jan 21, 2013
Jahmel Taylor; PG	Recruit ratings: Scout: Rivals: (73)				
Mike Anderson; SF	Hartford, CT	Moberly Area Community College	6 ft 5 in (1.96 m)	190 lb (86 kg)	Jan 25, 2013
Mike Anderson; SF	Recruit ratings: Scout: Rivals: (N/A)				
Overall recruit ranking: Scout: nr Rivals: nr ESPN: nr
Note: In many cases, Scout, Rivals, 247Sports, On3, and ESPN may conflict in their listings of height and weight.; In these cases, the average was taken. ESPN grades are on a 100-point scale.; Sources: "ESPN". ESPN.; "2013 Team Ranking". Rivals.

== Roster ==
2013–14 Washington Huskies men's basketball team
Players
Coaches

Pos.	#	Name	Height	Weight	Year	Previous school	Hometown
G	1	Darin Johnson	6 ft 5 in (1.96 m)	200 lb (91 kg)	Fr	Sheldon HS	Sacramento, CA
F	2	Perris Blackwell	6 ft 9 in (2.06 m)	275 lb (125 kg)	RS Sr	San Francisco	Etiwanda, CA
G	5	Nigel Williams-Goss	6 ft 3 in (1.91 m)	185 lb (84 kg)	Fr	Findlay Prep	Happy Valley, OR
F	10	Connor Smith (W)	6 ft 9 in (2.06 m)	200 lb (91 kg)	Sr	Wenatchee HS	Wenatchee, WA
G	11	Mike Anderson	6 ft 4 in (1.93 m)	195 lb (88 kg)	Jr	Moberly Area CC	Hartford, CT
G	12	Andrew Andrews	6 ft 2 in (1.88 m)	195 lb (88 kg)	RS So	Benson Poly HS	Portland, OR
G	21	Jahmel Taylor	6 ft 0 in (1.83 m)	175 lb (79 kg)	Fr	Pacific Hills School	Los Angeles, CA
G	22	Quinn Sterling	6 ft 5 in (1.96 m)	195 lb (88 kg)	Jr	Mercer Island HS	Mercer Island, WA
G	23	C. J. Wilcox	6 ft 5 in (1.96 m)	195 lb (88 kg)	RS Sr	Pleasant Grove HS	Pleasant Grove, UT
C	24	Robert Upshaw (redshirt)	6 ft 11 in (2.11 m)	255 lb (116 kg)	So	Fresno State	Fresno, CA
F	30	Desmond Simmons	6 ft 7 in (2.01 m)	225 lb (102 kg)	RS Jr	Salesian HS	Vallejo, CA
F	33	Jernard Jarreau	6 ft 10 in (2.08 m)	220 lb (100 kg)	RS So	McDonogh No. 35 Sr. HS	New Orleans, LA
C	34	Gilles Dierickx	7 ft 0 in (2.13 m)	235 lb (107 kg)	RS So	Florida International	Ghent, BEL
F	40	Shawn Kemp Jr.	6 ft 9 in (2.06 m)	250 lb (113 kg)	Jr	Hargrave Military Acad.	Canton, GA

Head coach

- Lorenzo Romar (Washington)

Assistant coach(es)

- Brad Jackson (Washington State)
- T. J. Otzelberger (UW–Whitewater)
- Jim Shaw (Western Oregon)
- Lamont Smith (San Diego)

Legend

- (C) Team captain
- (S) Suspended
- (I) Ineligible
- (W) Walk-on
- Injured
- Current redshirt

Roster
Last update: 12/14/13

=== Depth chart ===
Pos.	Starting 5	Bench 1	Bench 2
C	Perris Blackwell	Gilles Dierickx	Robert Upshaw (RS)
PF	C.J. Wilcox	Shawn Kemp Jr.	Jernard Jarreau
SF	Mike Anderson	Desmond Simmons	Connor Smith
SG	Andrew Andrews	Darin Johnson	Sterling Quinn
PG	Nigel Williams-Goss	Jahmel Taylor

=== Coaching staff ===
Name	Position	Year at Washington	Alma mater (year)
Lorenzo Romar	Head coach	12th	Washington (1980)
Brad Jackson	Assistant coach	2nd	Washington State (1975)
T.J. Otzelberger	Assistant coach	1st	Wisconsin-Whitewater (2001)
Jim Shaw	Assistant coach	10th	Western Oregon State (1985)
Lamont Smith	Assistant coach	2nd	San Diego (1998)
Lance LaVetter	Director of basketball operations	12th	Northern Arizona (1992)

== Schedule ==
Date time, TV	Rank^{#}	Opponent^{#}	Result	Record	Site (attendance) city, state
Exhibition
11/06/2013*; 7:00 pm		Central Washington	W 95–65	–	Alaska Airlines Arena (4,985); Seattle, WA
Non-conference regular season
11/10/2013*; 7:00 pm, P12N		Seattle	W 88–78	1–0	Alaska Airlines Arena (6,704); Seattle, WA
11/14/2013*; 8:00 pm, P12N		UC Irvine; 2K Sports Classic	L 72–86	1–1	Alaska Airlines Arena (5,875); Seattle, WA
11/17/2013*; 5:00 pm, P12N		Eastern Washington; 2K Sports Classic	W 92–80	2–1	Alaska Airlines Arena (6,504); Seattle, WA
11/21/2013*; 6:00 pm, ESPN2		vs. Indiana; 2K Sports Classic semifinals	L 84–102	2–2	Madison Square Garden (10,064); New York City, NY
11/22/2013*; 2:00 pm, ESPNU		vs. Boston College; 2K Sports Classic 3rd place game	L 78–89	2–3	Madison Square Garden (N/A); New York City, NY
11/26/2013*; 6:00 pm, P12N		Montana	W 83–79	3–3	Alaska Airlines Arena (6,062); Seattle, WA
11/30/2013*; 3:30 pm, P12N		Long Beach State	W 92–89 ^{2OT}	4–3	Alaska Airlines Arena (6,032); Seattle, WA
12/08/2013*; 12:05 pm, CBSSN		at No. 24 San Diego State	L 63–70	4–4	Viejas Arena (12,414); San Diego, CA
12/14/2013*; 1:00 pm, P12N		Idaho State	W 85–66	5–4	Alaska Airlines Arena (7,526); Seattle, WA
12/17/2013*; 5:00 pm		at Tulane	W 73–62	6–4	Devlin Fieldhouse (1,646); New Orleans, LA
12/22/2013*; 12:30 pm, ESPNU		No. 10 UConn	L 70–82	6–5	Alaska Airlines Arena (7,059); Seattle, WA
12/27/2013*; 7:30 pm, P12N		Mississippi Valley State	W 95–80	7–5	Alaska Airlines Arena (6,351); Seattle, WA
12/29/2013*; 6:00 pm, P12N		Hartford	W 73–67	8–5	Alaska Airlines Arena (6,617); Seattle, WA
Pac-12 regular season
01/02/2014; 5:00 pm, ESPNU		at Arizona State	W 76–65	9–5 (1–0)	Wells Fargo Arena (5,788); Tempe, AZ
01/04/2014; 11:00 am, P12N		at No. 1 Arizona	L 62–71	9–6 (1–1)	McKale Center (14,545); Tucson, AZ
01/08/2014; 8:00 pm, P12N		Utah	W 59–57	10–6 (2–1)	Alaska Airlines Arena (3,424); Seattle, WA
01/12/2014; 12:00 pm, FS1		No. 15 Colorado	W 71–54	11–6 (3–1)	Alaska Airlines Arena (6,742); Seattle, WA
01/16/2014; 8:00 pm, ESPNU		at California	L 56–82	11–7 (3–2)	Haas Pavilion (8,072); Berkeley, CA
01/18/2014; 8:00 pm, ESPNU		at Stanford	L 67–79	11–8 (3–3)	Maples Pavilion (4,503); Stanford, CA
01/23/2014; 8:00 pm, FS1		Oregon	W 80–76	12–8 (4–3)	Alaska Airlines Arena (6,748); Seattle, WA
01/25/2014; 2:00 pm, P12N		Oregon State	W 87–81	13–8 (5–3)	Alaska Airlines Arena (7,112); Seattle, WA
02/01/2014; 3:00 pm, P12N		at Washington State; Rivalry	L 67–72	13–9 (5–4)	Beasley Coliseum (5,796); Pullman, WA
02/06/2014; 6:00 pm, P12N		at Utah	L 69–78	13–10 (5–5)	Jon M. Huntsman Center (12,226); Salt Lake City, UT
02/09/2014; 5:00 pm, ESPN2		at Colorado	L 65–91	13–11 (5–6)	Coors Events Center (9,461); Boulder, CO
02/12/2014; 6:00 pm, ESPN		Stanford	W 64–60	14–11 (6–6)	Alaska Airlines Arena (6,981); Seattle, WA
02/15/2014; 12:00 pm, P12N		California	L 59–72	14–12 (6–7)	Alaska Airlines Arena (7,124); Seattle, WA
02/19/2014; 6:00 pm, ESPN2		at Oregon	L 71–78	14–13 (6–8)	Matthew Knight Arena (6,792); Eugene, OR
02/22/2014; 1:00 pm, P12N		at Oregon State	W 86–62	15–13 (7–8)	Gill Coliseum (5,280); Corvallis, OR
02/28/2014; 7:30 pm, P12N		Washington State; Rivalry	W 72–49	16–13 (8–8)	Alaska Airlines Arena (7,647); Seattle, WA
03/06/2014; 6:00 pm, ESPN2		UCLA	L 82–91	16–14 (8–9)	Alaska Airlines Arena (6,894); Seattle, WA
03/08/2014; 1:30 pm, P12N		USC	W 82–75	17–14 (9–9)	Alaska Airlines Arena (7,337); Seattle, WA
2014 Pac-12 Tournament
03/12/2014; 12:00 pm, P12N		vs. Utah; First round	L 61–67	17–15	MGM Grand Garden Arena (N/A); Paradise, NV
*Non-conference game. ^{#}Rankings from AP Poll. (#) Tournament seedings in parentheses. All times are in Pacific Time.

== See also ==
- 2013–14 Washington Huskies women's basketball team
