= 2013–14 UCLA Bruins men's basketball team =

American college basketball season

2013–14 UCLA Bruins men's basketball

Pac-12 Tournament champions

NCAA tournament, Sweet Sixteen
- Conference: Pac-12 Conference

Ranking
- Coaches: No. 15
- AP: No. 20
- Record: 28–9 (12–6 Pac-12)
- Head coach: Steve Alford (1st season)
- Assistant coaches: Ed Schilling; Duane Broussard; David Grace
- Home arena: Pauley Pavilion

2013–14 Pac-12 Conference men's basketball standings
	Conf.				Overall
Team	W		L	PCT	W		L	PCT
No. 4 Arizona	15	–	3	.833	33	–	5	.868
No. 20 UCLA †	12	–	6	.667	28	–	9	.757
Oregon	10	–	8	.556	24	–	10	.706
Colorado	10	–	8	.556	23	–	12	.657
Arizona State	10	–	8	.556	21	–	12	.636
Stanford	10	–	8	.556	23	–	13	.639
California	10	–	8	.556	21	–	14	.600
Utah	9	–	9	.500	21	–	12	.636
Washington	9	–	9	.500	17	–	15	.531
Oregon State	8	–	10	.444	16	–	16	.500
Washington State	3	–	15	.167	10	–	21	.323
USC	2	–	16	.111	11	–	21	.344
† Conference tournament winner Rankings from AP poll

The 2013–14 UCLA Bruins men's basketball team represented the University of California, Los Angeles during the 2013–14 NCAA Division I men's basketball season. The Bruins were led by first year head coach Steve Alford and played home games at Pauley Pavilion as members in the Pac-12 Conference. They finished the season 28–9 and advanced to the Sweet 16 of the NCAA tournament.

UCLA finished 12–6 in Pac-12 play, finishing in second place in the conference. At the Pac-12 tournament, the Bruins defeated the Arizona Wildcats 75–71 for the tournament championship. Kyle Anderson was voted the tournament's Most Outstanding Player after scoring 21 points and grabbing 15 rebounds in the championship game. As Pac-12 Tournament champions, the Bruins received an automatic bid to the NCAA Tournament, where they defeated Tulsa and Stephen F. Austin to advance to the Sweet Sixteen—their first regional semifinal appearance since 2008—where they lost to Florida, who improved to 4–0 all-time against UCLA in the NCAA tournament.

== Departures ==
Name	Number	Pos.	Height	Weight	Year	Hometown	Notes
Shabazz Muhammad	15	G/F	6'6"	225	Freshman	Las Vegas, Nevada	Declared for 2013 NBA draft
Larry Drew II	10	PG	6'2"	180	Senior	Encino, California	Graduated

== Recruiting class ==
College recruiting
Name	Hometown	School	Height	Weight	Commit date
Zach LaVine; G	Bothell, WA	Bothell High School	6 ft 3 in (1.91 m)	165 lb (75 kg)	Jun 20, 2012
Zach LaVine; G	Recruit ratings: Scout: Rivals: (88)				
Bryce Alford; G	Albuquerque, NM	La Cueva High School	6 ft 3 in (1.91 m)	175 lb (79 kg)	Mar 30, 2013
Bryce Alford; G	Recruit ratings: Scout: Rivals: (75)				
Noah Allen; F	Salinas, CA	Palma High School	6 ft 6 in (1.98 m)	195 lb (88 kg)	Nov 6, 2012
Noah Allen; F	Recruit ratings: Scout: Rivals: (75)				
Overall recruit ranking: Scout: 16 Rivals: 28 ESPN: 20
Note: In many cases, Scout, Rivals, 247Sports, On3, and ESPN may conflict in their listings of height and weight.; In these cases, the average was taken. ESPN grades are on a 100-point scale.; Sources: "UCLA Commit List for 2013". Rivals.; "2013 UCLA Basketball Commits". Scout.; "ESPN". ESPN.; "Scout.com Team Recruiting Rankings". Scout.; "2013 Team Ranking". Rivals.

== Roster ==
2013–14 UCLA Bruins men's basketball team
Players
Coaches

Pos.	#	Name	Height	Weight	Year	Previous school	Hometown
G	0	Nick Kazemi	6 ft 3 in (1.91 m)	205 lb (93 kg)	RS So	Tustin H.S.	Santa Ana, California
F	1	Wanaah Bail	6 ft 9 in (2.06 m)	215 lb (98 kg)	Fr	Lamar Consolidated H.S.	Houston, Texas
G	2	Kory Alford	6 ft 4 in (1.93 m)	190 lb (86 kg)	RS So	La Cueva H.S.	Albuquerque, New Mexico
G	3	Jordan Adams	6 ft 5 in (1.96 m)	220 lb (100 kg)	So	Oak Hill Academy	Lawrenceville, Georgia
G	4	Norman Powell	6 ft 4 in (1.93 m)	215 lb (98 kg)	Jr	Lincoln H.S.	San Diego, California
G/F	5	Kyle Anderson	6 ft 9 in (2.06 m)	230 lb (104 kg)	So	St. Anthony H.S.	Fairview, New Jersey
G	10	Isaac Hamilton (I)	6 ft 5 in (1.96 m)	185 lb (84 kg)	Fr	St. John Bosco H.S.	Los Angeles, California
F	12	David Wear	6 ft 10 in (2.08 m)	230 lb (104 kg)	RS Sr	Mater Dei H.S.	Huntington Beach, California
G	13	David Brown	6 ft 3 in (1.91 m)	185 lb (84 kg)	Jr	Mater Dei H.S.	Anaheim Hills, California
G	14	Zach LaVine	6 ft 5 in (1.96 m)	180 lb (82 kg)	Fr	Bothell H.S.	Bothell, Washington
G	20	Bryce Alford	6 ft 3 in (1.91 m)	180 lb (82 kg)	Fr	La Cueva H.S.	Albuquerque, New Mexico
G/F	22	Noah Allen	6 ft 6 in (1.98 m)	215 lb (98 kg)	Fr	Palma H.S.	Salinas, California
F/C	23	Tony Parker	6 ft 9 in (2.06 m)	255 lb (116 kg)	So	Miller Grove H.S.	Lithonia, Georgia
F	24	Travis Wear	6 ft 10 in (2.08 m)	230 lb (104 kg)	RS Sr	Mater Dei H.S.	Huntington Beach, California
G	30	Aubrey Williams	5 ft 8 in (1.73 m)	175 lb (79 kg)	Sr	Knight H.S.	Palmdale, California
C	44	Sooren Derboghosian	6 ft 10 in (2.08 m)	240 lb (109 kg)	Sr	Glendale C.C.	Tehran, Iran

Head coach

- Steve Alford (Indiana)

Assistant coach(es)

- Ed Schilling (Miami (OH))
- Duane Broussard (Bradley)
- David Grace (Park)

Legend

- (C) Team captain
- (S) Suspended
- (I) Ineligible
- (W) Walk-on
- Injured
- Current redshirt

Roster
Last update: 12/01/13

== Schedule ==
Date time, TV	Rank^{#}	Opponent^{#}	Result	Record	Site (attendance) city, state
Exhibition
10/30, 2013*; 7:30 pm	No. 22	Cal State San Bernardino	W 96–66	–	Pauley Pavilion (4,522); Los Angeles, CA
November 4, 2013*; 7:30 pm, P12N	No. 22	Cal State San Marcos	W 109–79	–	Pauley Pavilion (4,023); Los Angeles, CA
Non Conference Season
November 8, 2013*; 9:00 pm, P12N	No. 22	Drexel	W 72–67	1–0	Pauley Pavilion (6,859); Los Angeles, CA
November 12, 2013*; 6:00 pm, P12N	No. 24	Oakland	W 91–60	2–0	Pauley Pavilion (4,771); Los Angeles, CA
November 18, 2013*; 8:00 pm, P12N	No. 22	Sacramento State	W 86–50	3–0	Pauley Pavilion (5,489); Los Angeles, CA
November 22, 2013*; 8:00 pm, P12N	No. 22	Morehead State; Las Vegas Invitational	W 81–70	4–0	Pauley Pavilion (5,508); Los Angeles, CA
November 24, 2013*; 7:00 pm, P12N	No. 22	Chattanooga; Las Vegas Invitational	W 106–65	5–0	Pauley Pavilion (5,739); Los Angeles, CA
November 28, 2013*; 4:30 pm, ESPN3	No. 19	vs. Nevada; Las Vegas Invitational	W 105–84	6–0	Orleans Arena (2,250); Paradise, NV
November 29, 2013*; 8:30 pm, ESPN2	No. 19	vs. Northwestern; Las Vegas Invitational	W 95–79	7–0	Orleans Arena (2,520); Paradise, NV
December 3, 2013*; 8:00 pm, P12N	No. 18	UC Santa Barbara	W 89–76	8–0	Pauley Pavilion (6,644); Los Angeles, CA
December 7, 2013*; 9:30 am, CBS	No. 18	at Missouri	L 71–80	8–1	Mizzou Arena (8,826); Columbia, MO
December 14, 2013*; 5:00 pm, P12N		Prairie View A&M	W 95–71	9–1	Pauley Pavilion (6,864); Los Angeles, CA
December 19, 2013*; 4:30 pm, ESPN		vs. No. 8 Duke; CARQUEST Auto Parts Classic	L 63–80	9–2	Madison Square Garden (15,410); New York City, NY
December 22, 2013*; 4:00 pm, P12N		Weber State	W 83–60	10–2	Pauley Pavilion (7,013); Los Angeles, CA
December 28, 2013*; 7:00 pm, ESPN2		Alabama	W 75–67	11–2	Pauley Pavilion (9,061); Los Angeles, CA
Conference Season
January 5, 2014; 12:00 pm, FS1		USC	W 107–73	12–2 (1–0)	Pauley Pavilion (11,285); Los Angeles, CA
January 9, 2014; 6:00 pm, ESPN		No. 1 Arizona	L 75–79	12–3 (1–1)	Pauley Pavilion (13,283); Los Angeles, CA
January 12, 2014; 7:00 pm, ESPNU		Arizona State	W 87–72	13–3 (2–1)	Pauley Pavilion (8,003); Los Angeles, CA
January 16, 2014; 5:00 pm, P12N	No. 25	at No. 21 Colorado	W 69–56	14–3 (3–1)	Coors Events Center (10,802); Boulder, CO
January 18, 2014; 1:00 pm, FS1	No. 25	at Utah	L 69–74	14–4 (3–2)	Jon M. Huntsman Center (12,267); Salt Lake City, UT
January 23, 2014; 8:00 pm, P12N		Stanford	W 91–74	15–4 (4–2)	Pauley Pavilion (9,068); Los Angeles, CA
January 26, 2014; 5:00 pm, ESPNU		California	W 76–64	16–4 (5–2)	Pauley Pavilion (10,344); Los Angeles, CA
January 30, 2014; 6:00 pm, ESPN2		at Oregon	W 70–68	17–4 (6–2)	Matthew Knight Arena (8,766); Eugene, OR
February 2, 2014; 11:30 am, ESPNU		at Oregon State	L 67–71	17–5 (6–3)	Gill Coliseum (4,509); Corvallis, OR
February 8, 2014; 7:30 pm, P12N		at USC	W 83–73	18–5 (7–3)	Galen Center (9,216); Los Angeles, CA
February 13, 2014; 6:00 pm, ESPN2		Colorado	W 92–74	19–5 (8–3)	Pauley Pavilion (8,431); Los Angeles, CA
February 15, 2014; 2:00 pm, P12N		Utah	W 80–66	20–5 (9–3)	Pauley Pavilion (9,577); Los Angeles, CA
February 19, 2014; 7:30 pm, P12N	No. 23	at California	W 86–66	21–5 (10–3)	Haas Pavilion (10,837); Berkeley, CA
February 22, 2014; 3:00 pm, ESPN2	No. 23	at Stanford	L 74–83	21–6 (10–4)	Maples Pavilion (7,031); Stanford, CA
February 27, 2014; 6:00 pm, ESPN2		Oregon	L 83–87 ^{2OT}	21–7 (10–5)	Pauley Pavilion (8,643); Los Angeles, CA
March 2, 2014; 6:00 pm, FS1		Oregon State	W 74–69	22–7 (11–5)	Pauley Pavilion (9,873); Los Angeles, CA
March 6, 2014; 6:00 pm, ESPN2		at Washington	W 91–82	23–7 (12–5)	Alaska Airlines Arena (6,894); Seattle, WA
March 8, 2014; 8:00 pm, FS1		at Washington State	L 55–73	23–8 (12–6)	Beasley Coliseum (3,142); Pullman, WA
Pac-12 Tournament
March 13, 2014; 6:00 pm, P12N		vs. Oregon; Quarterfinals	W 82–63	24–8	MGM Grand Garden Arena (12,916); Paradise, NV
March 14, 2014; 8:40 pm, FS1		vs. Stanford; Semifinals	W 84–59	25–8	MGM Grand Garden Arena (12,916); Paradise, NV
March 15, 2014; 3:00 pm, FS1		vs. No. 4 Arizona; Championship	W 75–71	26–8	MGM Grand Garden Arena (12,916); Paradise, NV
NCAA tournament
March 21, 2014*; 6:57 pm, truTV	No. 20 (4 S)	vs. (13 S) Tulsa; Second round	W 76–59	27–8	Viejas Arena (11,488); San Diego, CA
March 23, 2014*; 4:10 pm, TBS	No. 20 (4 S)	vs. (12 S) Stephen F. Austin; Third round	W 77–60	28–8	Viejas Arena (11,504); San Diego, CA
March 27, 2014*; 6:45 pm, CBS	No. 20 (4 S)	vs. No. 1 (1 S) Florida; Sweet Sixteen	L 68–79	28–9	FedExForum (14,991); Memphis, TN
*Non-conference game. ^{#}Rankings from AP Poll, (#) during NCAA Tournament is seed within region. S=South Region. (#) Tournament seedings in parentheses. All times are in Pacific Time.

== Honors ==
- January 27, 2014: Kyle Anderson is named Pac-12 Conference Player of the Week
- March 10, 2014: Jordan Adams and Kyle Anderson are named to the All-Pac-12 Conference First Team; Bryce Alford and Zach LaVine are named to the Pac-12 All-Freshman Team; Jordan Adams and Norman Powell are named honorable mention of the All-Defensive Team
- March 11, 2014: Jordan Adams and Kyle Anderson are named to the USBWA District IX All-District Team
- March 12, 2014: Kyle Anderson and Jordan Adams are named to the NABC District 20 All-District First Team
- March 15, 2014: Kyle Anderson is named Pac-12 Conference tournament MVP
- March 31, 2014: Kyle Anderson is named to the third-team Associated Press and Sporting News All-America teams

== Rankings ==
Ranking movements Legend: ██ Increase in ranking ██ Decrease in ranking — = Not ranked RV = Received votes
	Week																				
Poll	Pre	2	3	4	5	6	7	8	9	10	11	12	13	14	15	16	17	18	19	20	Final
AP	22	24	22	19	18	RV	RV	RV	RV	RV	25	RV	RV	RV	RV	23	RV	RV	RV	20	N/A
Coaches	23	24	24	21	17	23	22	RV	RV	25	25	RV	RV	RV	RV	25	RV	RV	—	23	15

== Team players drafted in the NBA ==
Year	Round	Pick	Player	NBA Team
2014	1	13	Zach LaVine	Minnesota Timberwolves
2014	1	22	Jordan Adams	Memphis Grizzlies
2014	1	30	Kyle Anderson	San Antonio Spurs

== Notes ==
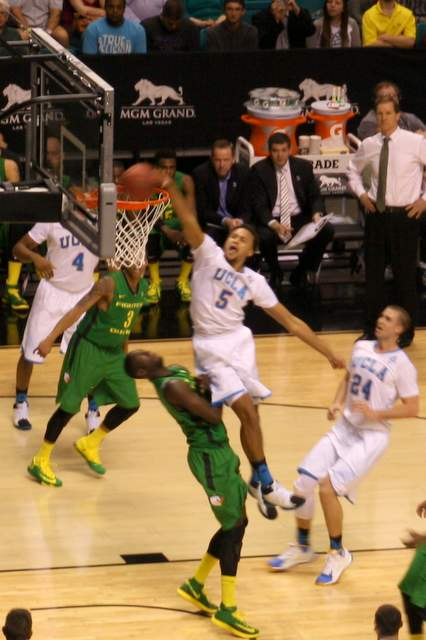
Kyle Anderson against Oregon during Pac-12 Tournament

- September 26, 2013 – Isaac Hamilton joins the team
- October 17, 2013 – The Bruins were picked to finish 2nd in the conference by the Pac-12 media
- October 31, 2013 – Isaac Hamilton's appeal to NCAA to allow him to play this season without having to sit out a season was denied.
- November 29, 2013 – The team won the Continental Tire Las Vegas Invitational; Kyle Anderson was the tournament's MVP; Jordan Adams and Zach LaVine were named to the all-tournament team.
- January 27, 2014 – Sophomore Anderson was named Pac-12 Player of the Week
- February 27, 2014 - Anderson and Adams missed one game after being suspended for a violation of team rules.
- March 14, 2014 – Director of Operations Tyus Edney to be inducted into the Pac-12 Conference Hall of Honor.
- Home attendance for the season averaged 8,136 for the 13,800-seat Pauley Pavilion. It was down from 9,549 in 2012–13, with school officials attributing the higher attendance to the renovated reopening of the arena.
- March 15, 2014 – Norman Powell shot 16 of 18 points at the free throw line at the Pac-12 tournament, tied for the fourth best percentage in tournament history

== See also ==
2013–14 UCLA Bruins women's basketball team

- List of UCLA Bruins in the NBA
