= 2014 Pac-12 Conference men's basketball tournament =

- Classification: Division I
- Season: 2013–14
- Teams: 12
- Site: MGM Grand Garden Arena; Paradise, Nevada
- Champions: UCLA (4th title)
- Winning coach: Steve Alford (1st title)
- MVP: Kyle Anderson (UCLA)
- Television: Pac-12 Network, FS1

2013–14 Pac-12 Conference men's basketball standings
| | Conf. | | | | Overall |
| Team | W | | L | PCT | W | | L | PCT |
|---|---|---|---|---|---|---|---|---|
| No. 4 Arizona | 15 | – | 3 | .833 | 33 | – | 5 | .868 |
| No. 20 UCLA † | 12 | – | 6 | .667 | 28 | – | 9 | .757 |
| Oregon | 10 | – | 8 | .556 | 24 | – | 10 | .706 |
| Colorado | 10 | – | 8 | .556 | 23 | – | 12 | .657 |
| Arizona State | 10 | – | 8 | .556 | 21 | – | 12 | .636 |
| Stanford | 10 | – | 8 | .556 | 23 | – | 13 | .639 |
| California | 10 | – | 8 | .556 | 21 | – | 14 | .600 |
| Utah | 9 | – | 9 | .500 | 21 | – | 12 | .636 |
| Washington | 9 | – | 9 | .500 | 17 | – | 15 | .531 |
| Oregon State | 8 | – | 10 | .444 | 16 | – | 16 | .500 |
| Washington State | 3 | – | 15 | .167 | 10 | – | 21 | .323 |
| USC | 2 | – | 16 | .111 | 11 | – | 21 | .344 |
† Conference tournament winner Rankings from AP poll

The 2014 Pac-12 Conference men's basketball tournament was the post-season men's basketball tournament for the Pac-12 during the 2013–14 season. It was played from March 12–15 at the MGM Grand Garden Arena in Paradise, Nevada. The champion received an automatic bid to the 2014 NCAA tournament. The UCLA Bruins won the tournament with a 75–71 victory over the Arizona Wildcats in the championship game.

== Seeds ==
| Seed | School | Conference | Overall | Tiebreaker |
|---|---|---|---|---|
| 1 | Arizona†# | 15–3 | 28–3 | |
| 2 | UCLA# | 12–6 | 23–8 | |
| 3 | Arizona State# | 10–8 | 21–10 | 5–3 vs. Cal, Col, Oreg & Stan |
| 4 | California# | 10–8 | 19–12 | 3–1 vs. Col, Oreg & Stan |
| 5 | Colorado | 10–8 | 21–10 | 2–0 vs. Oreg & Stan |
| 6 | Stanford | 10–8 | 19–11 | 1–0 vs. Oregon |
| 7 | Oregon | 10–8 | 22–8 | 0–1 vs. Stanford |
| 8 | Utah | 9–9 | 20–10 | 1–1 vs. Wash, 0–2 vs. Ariz, 1–1 vs. UCLA |
| 9 | Washington | 9–9 | 17–14 | 1–1 vs. Utah, 0–1 vs. Ariz, 0–1 vs. UCLA |
| 10 | Oregon State | 8–10 | 16–14 | |
| 11 | Washington State | 3–15 | 10–20 | |
| 12 | USC | 2–16 | 11–20 | |
† – Pac-12 regular season champions, and tournament No. 1 seed. # – Received a first round bye in the conference tournament. Overall records include all games played in the Pac-12 Tournament.

Teams will be seeded by conference record, with ties broken by record between the tied teams followed by record against the regular-season champion, if necessary.

== Schedule ==
Wednesday–Saturday, March 12–15, 2014

The top four seeds received a first-round bye.

| Session | Game | Time* | Matchup^{#} | Final Score | Television | Attendance |
First round – Wednesday, March 12
| 1 | 1 | 12:00 pm | #8 Utah vs. #9 Washington | 67–61 | Pac-12 Network | 8,734 |
| 1 | 2 | 2:30 pm | #5 Colorado vs. #12 USC | 59–56 | Pac-12 Network | 8,734 |
| 2 | 3 | 6:00 pm | #7 Oregon vs. #10 Oregon State | 88–74 | Pac-12 Network | 9,047 |
| 2 | 4 | 8:30 pm | #6 Stanford vs. #11 Washington State | 74–63 | Pac-12 Network | 9,047 |
Quarterfinals – Thursday, March 13
| 3 | 5 | 12:00 pm | #1 Arizona vs. #8 Utah | 71–39 | Pac-12 Network | 12,916 |
| 3 | 6 | 2:30 pm | #4 California vs. #5 Colorado | 56–59 | Pac-12 Network | 12,916 |
| 4 | 7 | 6:00 pm | #2 UCLA vs. #7 Oregon | 82–63 | Pac-12 Network | 12,916 |
| 4 | 8 | 8:30 pm | #3 Arizona State vs. #6 Stanford | 58–79 | Fox Sports 1 | 12,916 |
Semifinals – Friday, March 14
| 5 | 9 | 6:00 pm | #1 Arizona vs. #5 Colorado | 63–43 | Pac-12 Network | 12,916 |
| 5 | 10 | 8:30 pm | #2 UCLA vs. #6 Stanford | 84–59 | Fox Sports 1 | 12,916 |
Championship – Saturday, March 15
| 6 | 11 | 3:00 pm | #1 Arizona vs. #2 UCLA | 71–75 | Fox Sports 1 | 12,916 |
*Game times in PT. #-Rankings denote tournament seed

== Bracket ==
First round March 12
8 | Utah | 67
9 | Washington | 61
5 | Colorado | 59
12 | USC | 56
7 | Oregon | 88
10 | Oregon State | 74
6 | Stanford | 74
11 | Washington State | 63

Quarterfinals; March 13
1 | #4 Arizona | 71
8 | Utah | 39
4 | California | 56
5 | Colorado | 59
2 | UCLA | 82
7 | Oregon | 63
3 | Arizona State | 58
6 | Stanford | 79

Semifinals; March 14
1 | #4 Arizona | 63
5 | Colorado | 43
2 | UCLA | 84
6 | Stanford | 59

Championship; March 15
1 | #4 Arizona | 71
2 | UCLA | 75

== Game summaries ==
March 15
3:00pm PDT

Box score

UCLA Bruins 75, Arizona Wildcats 71
Scoring by half: 43-40, 32-31
| Pts: Anderson, 21; Rebs: Anderson, 15; Asts: Anderson, 5 | Pts: Johnson, 21; Rebs: Gordon & Hollis-Jefferson, 8 Asts: Gordon, 8 |

MGM Grand Garden Arena
Attendance: 12,916
Referees: Dick Cartmell, Randy McCall, Mike Reed

In a matchup of the two best teams in the Pac-12, UCLA upset No. 4 Arizona 75–71 to win the conference tournament final. The Bruins' Jordan Adams made a three-point field goal that broke a tie with 45 seconds remaining. Teammate Kyle Anderson had 21 points, 15 rebounds and five assists, and was named the tournament's Most Outstanding Player. "I don't know that I've ever seen [those numbers] and just one turnover for a point guard," said Arizona coach Sean Miller of Anderson's performance.

UCLA twice led by 11 in the first half, including 12–0 spurt at the start of the game that put them ahead 14–3. It temporarily quieted Arizona fans, who made up an overwhelming majority of the crowd. The Wildcats used a 12–2 run to cut the Bruins lead to 43–40 at halftime. UCLA exceeded Utah's 39 points from their entire second-round game against Arizona, and matched Colorado's game total of 43 against the Wildcats in the semifinals. One the nation's top defenses, Arizona allowed the Bruins to shoot 58.1 percent, making 18 of 31 from the field. The Wildcats defense tightened in the second half, when the game saw seven ties and eight lead changes. Arizona took their second lead of the game with less than 16 minutes remaining in the game—they first led 3–2 early. Arizona's Nick Johnson, the Pac-12 Player of the Year, scored 14 of his 22 in the second half. However, Anderson countered with 10 points and nine rebounds in the half.

Free throws were a key difference in the game, with UCLA making 21 of 25, while Arizona was only 6 of 16. The Wildcats surrendered 75 points just twice all season, both times to the Bruins; UCLA lost 79–75 to Arizona earlier in January.

== Tournament notes ==
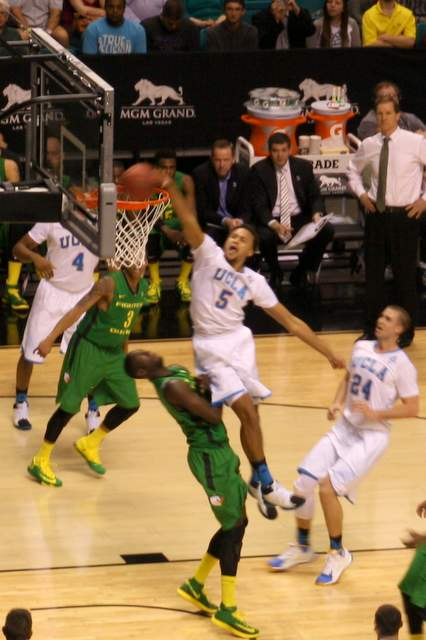
Kyle Anderson of UCLA dunks during quarterfinals against Oregon

- Arizona's 71-39 win over Utah tied the tournament record for largest margin in a game (32), set in 2006 when UCLA won 79–47 over Oregon.
- The No. 1 and 2 seeds met in the final game for the first time since 2008, which UCLA also won.
- Travis Wear of UCLA tied the record for best field goal % in a tournament game at 100% (8-of-8), vs. STAN, Mar. 14, 2014. This perfect % had been done only twice before with a min. of 7 attempts.
- Six teams were invited to the NCAA tournament: Arizona, UCLA, Colorado, Oregon, Stanford, and Arizona State. Arizona received a number one seed.
- Oregon became the first Pac-12 team to play all eleven other Pac-12 opponents in the conference tournament upon playing Oregon St.

== All-tournament team ==
The following were honored as the top players of the tournament:

- Kyle Anderson, UCLA — Most Outstanding Player
- Askia Booker, Colorado
- Aaron Gordon, Arizona
- Nick Johnson, Arizona
- Chasson Randle, Stanford
- Joe Young, Oregon

== Most outstanding player ==
The MVP was determined after the Tournament. Kyle Anderson, who scored 21 points and grabbed 15 rebounds for UCLA in the championship game, was named Tournament MVP.

== Hall of Honor inductees ==
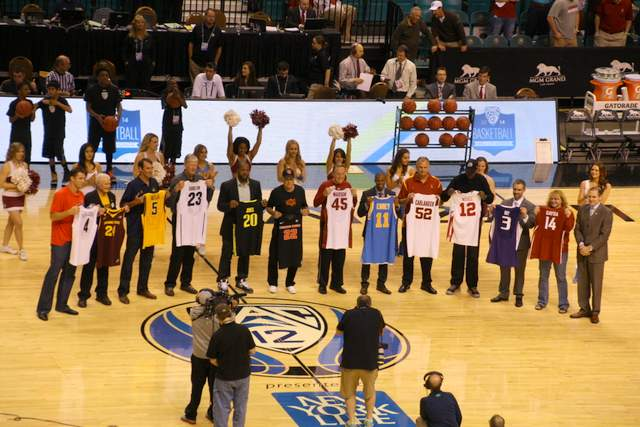
2014 Hall of Honor induction ceremony

Induction ceremony was held on Friday, March 14, 2014, during the tournament:

- Luke Walton (Arizona)
- Verl Heap (Arizona State)
- Dave Butler (California)
- Ken Charlton (Colorado)
- Fred Jones (Oregon)
- Lee Harman (Oregon State)
- Mark Madsen (Stanford)
- Tyus Edney (UCLA)
- Wayne Carlander (USC)
- Billy McGill (Utah)
- Brandon Roy (Washington)
- Ed Gayda (Washington State)

== See also ==
- 2014 Pac-12 Conference women's basketball tournament
