= 2013–14 Washington State Cougars men's basketball team =

American college basketball season

2013–14 Washington State Cougars men's basketball
- Conference: Pac-12 Conference
- Record: 10–21 (3–15 Pac-12)
- Head coach: Ken Bone (5th year)
- Assistant coaches: Curtis Allen; Ben Johnson; Ray Lopes
- Home arena: Beasley Coliseum

2013–14 Pac-12 Conference men's basketball standings
	Conf.				Overall
Team	W		L	PCT	W		L	PCT
No. 4 Arizona	15	–	3	.833	33	–	5	.868
No. 20 UCLA †	12	–	6	.667	28	–	9	.757
Oregon	10	–	8	.556	24	–	10	.706
Colorado	10	–	8	.556	23	–	12	.657
Arizona State	10	–	8	.556	21	–	12	.636
Stanford	10	–	8	.556	23	–	13	.639
California	10	–	8	.556	21	–	14	.600
Utah	9	–	9	.500	21	–	12	.636
Washington	9	–	9	.500	17	–	15	.531
Oregon State	8	–	10	.444	16	–	16	.500
Washington State	3	–	15	.167	10	–	21	.323
USC	2	–	16	.111	11	–	21	.344
† Conference tournament winner Rankings from AP poll

The 2013–14 Washington State Cougars men's basketball team represented Washington State University during the 2013–14 NCAA Division I men's basketball season. The Cougars, led by fifth-year head coach Ken Bone, played their games at the Beasley Coliseum and were members of the Pac-12 Conference. They finished with a record of 10–21 overall, 3–15 in Pac-12 play to finish in eleventh place. They lost in the first round of the 2014 Pac-12 Conference men's basketball tournament to Stanford.

On March 18, 2014, it was announced that Bone had been fired after five seasons with Washington State.

== Departures ==
Name	Number	Pos.	Height	Weight	Year	Hometown	Notes
Mike Ladd	2	G	6'5"	195	RS senior	Seattle, WA	Graduated
Bryce Leavitt	4	G	6'4"	184	Freshman	Kennewick, WA	Transferred to North Idaho College
Brett Kingma	10	G	6'1"	175	Sophomore	Mill Creek, WA	Suspended
Brock Motum	12	F	6'10"	245	Senior	Brisbane, AUS	Graduated

== Recruits ==
College recruiting
Name	Hometown	School	Height	Weight	Commit date
Ikenna Iroegbu; PG	Mouth of Wilson, VA	Oak Hill Academy	6 ft 2 in (1.88 m)	190 lb (86 kg)	Oct 12, 2012
Ikenna Iroegbu; PG	Recruit ratings: Scout: Rivals: (74)				
Josh Hawkinson; PF	Shoreline, WA	Shorewood	6 ft 9 in (2.06 m)	230 lb (100 kg)	Oct 22, 2012
Josh Hawkinson; PF	Recruit ratings: Scout: Rivals: (70)				
Tanner Lancona; PF	Rancho Santa Margarita, CA	Tesoro	6 ft 8 in (2.03 m)	225 lb (102 kg)	Oct 29, 2012
Tanner Lancona; PF	Recruit ratings: Scout: Rivals: (70)				
Overall recruit ranking: Scout: nr Rivals: nr ESPN: nr
Note: In many cases, Scout, Rivals, 247Sports, On3, and ESPN may conflict in their listings of height and weight.; In these cases, the average was taken. ESPN grades are on a 100-point scale.; Sources: "Washington State 2013 Basketball Commitments". Rivals.; "ESPN". ESPN.; "2013 Team Ranking". Rivals.

== Roster ==
2013–14 Washington State Cougars men's basketball team
Players
Coaches

Pos.	#	Name	Height	Weight	Year	Previous school	Hometown
G	0	Ike Iroegbu	6 ft 2 in (1.88 m)	190 lb (86 kg)	Fr	Oak Hill Acad.	Elk Grove, CA
G	3	Danny Lawhorn	5 ft 10 in (1.78 m)	165 lb (75 kg)	Jr	San Jacinto College; Hartford Public HS	Hartford, CT
G	5	Will DiIorio	6 ft 5 in (1.96 m)	190 lb (86 kg)	Sr	Bainbridge HS	Bainbridge Island, WA
G	10	Dexter Kernich-Drew	6 ft 6 in (1.98 m)	182 lb (83 kg)	RS Jr	Caulfield Grammar	Melbourne, AUS
F	13	James Hunter	6 ft 9 in (2.06 m)	250 lb (113 kg)	RS Jr	Gillette College	Sydney, AUS
F	15	Richard Longrus, Jr.	6 ft 7 in (2.01 m)	232 lb (105 kg)	So	Bishop O'Dowd HS	Oakland, CA
C	20	Jordan Railey	6 ft 10 in (2.08 m)	264 lb (120 kg)	RS Jr	Iowa State; Beaverton HS	Beaverton, OR
G	21	Dominic Ballard	6 ft 4 in (1.93 m)	199 lb (90 kg)	RS So	Bothell HS	Seattle, WA
G	22	Royce Woolridge	6 ft 3 in (1.91 m)	175 lb (79 kg)	RS Jr	Kansas; Sunnyslope HS	Phoenix, AZ
F	23	D. J. Shelton	6 ft 10 in (2.08 m)	240 lb (109 kg)	RS Sr	Citrus College; East Bakersfield HS	Rialto, CA
F	24	Josh Hawkinson	6 ft 9 in (2.06 m)	220 lb (100 kg)	Fr	East Shorewood HS	Shoreline, WA
G	25	DaVonté Lacy	6 ft 3 in (1.91 m)	206 lb (93 kg)	Jr	Curtis Sr. HS	Tacoma, WA
F	31	Keaton Hayenga	6 ft 5 in (1.96 m)	209 lb (95 kg)	Jr	Bellevue College; Eastlake HS	Sammamish, WA
F	32	Que Johnson	6 ft 5 in (1.96 m)	205 lb (93 kg)	RS Fr	Westwind Prep	Pontiac, MI
F	33	Brett Boese	6 ft 7 in (2.01 m)	214 lb (97 kg)	So	Shadle Park HS	Spokane, WA

Head coach

- Ken Bone (Seattle Pacific)

Assistant coach(es)

- Curtis Allen (Washington)
- Ben Johnson (Green Bay)
- Ray Lopez (College of Idaho)

Legend

- (C) Team captain
- (S) Suspended
- (I) Ineligible
- (W) Walk-on
- Injured
- Current redshirt

Roster

== Schedule ==
Date time, TV	Rank^{#}	Opponent^{#}	Result	Record	Site (attendance) city, state
Exhibition
11/01/2013*; 8:00 pm		Central Washington	W 91–56	–	Beasley Coliseum (N/A); Pullman, WA
Regular season
11/08/2013*; 7:00 pm, P12N		Cal State Bakersfield	W 62–56	1–0	Beasley Coliseum (3,032); Pullman, WA
11/16/2013*; 9:30 pm, P12N		Lamar	W 84–64	2–0	Beasley Coliseum (2,593); Pullman, WA
11/21/2013*; 6:00 pm, KHQ/RTNW		at No. 13 Gonzaga	L 74–90	2–1	McCarthey Athletic Center (6,000); Spokane, WA
11/24/2013*; 3:00 pm, P12N		TCU	L 62–64	2–2	Beasley Coliseum (2,237); Pullman, WA
11/28/2013*; 11:00 am, ESPN2		vs. Butler; Old Spice Classic first round	L 69–76	2–3	HP Field House (4,255); Lake Buena Vista, FL
11/29/2013*; 8:00 am, ESPNU		vs. Purdue; Old Spice Classic Consolation 2nd Round	W 69–54	3–3	HP Field House (N/A); Lake Buena Vista, FL
12/01/2013*; 9:00 am, ESPNU		vs. Saint Joseph's; Old Spice Classic 5th place game	L 67–72	3–4	HP Field House (N/A); Lake Buena Vista, FL
12/07/2013*; 7:00 pm, SWX		at Idaho; Battle of the Palouse	W 67–66	4–4	Cowan Spectrum (4,142); Moscow, ID
12/15/2013*; 5:00 pm, P12N		Pepperdine	W 78–61	5–4	Beasley Coliseum (2,243); Pullman, WA
12/18/2013*; 7:00 pm, P12N		vs. San Francisco State	W 80–50	6–4	Toyota Center (2,911); Kennewick, WA
12/21/2013*; 5:30 pm, P12N		UTEP	L 51–64	6–5	Beasley Coliseum (1,823); Pullman, WA
12/28/2013*; 5:00 pm, P12N		Mississippi Valley State	W 85–48	7–5	Beasley Coliseum (1,952); Pullman, WA
01/02/2014; 7:00 pm, P12N		at No. 1 Arizona	L 25–60	7–6 (0–1)	McKale Center (14,545); Tucson, AZ
01/05/2014; 3:00 pm, ESPNU		at Arizona State	L 47–66	7–7 (0–2)	Wells Fargo Arena (5,072); Tempe, AZ
01/08/2014; 6:00 pm, P12N		vs. No. 15 Colorado	L 70–71 ^{OT}	7–8 (0–3)	Spokane Arena (3,122); Spokane, WA
01/12/2014; 4:00 pm, P12N		Utah	W 49–46	8–8 (1–3)	Beasley Coliseum (2,375); Pullman, WA
01/15/2014; 7:00 pm, P12N		Stanford	L 48–80	8–9 (1–4)	Maples Pavilion (3,908); Stanford, CA
01/18/2014; 1:00 pm, P12N		at California	L 55–76	8–10 (1–5)	Haas Pavilion (9,348); Berkeley, CA
01/22/2014; 7:00 pm, P12N		Oregon State	L 55–66	8–11 (1–6)	Beasley Coliseum (2,632); Pullman, WA
01/26/2014; 4:00 pm, P12N		Oregon	L 44–71	8–12 (1–7)	Beasley Coliseum (3,866); Pullman, WA
02/01/2014; 3:00 pm, P12N		Washington; Rivalry	W 72–67	9–12 (2–7)	Beasley Coliseum (5,796); Pullman, WA
02/05/2014; 6:30 pm, P12N		at Colorado	L 63–68	9–13 (2–8)	Coors Events Center (8,903); Boulder, CO
02/08/2014; 5:00 pm, P12N		at Utah	L 63–81	9–14 (2–9)	Jon M. Huntsman Center (11,634); Salt Lake City, UT
02/12/2014; 8:00 pm, ESPNU		California	L 76–80 ^{OT}	9–15 (2–10)	Beasley Coliseum (1,913); Pullman, WA
02/15/2014; 7:00 pm, P12N		Stanford	L 56–69	9–16 (2–11)	Beasley Coliseum (3,054); Pullman, WA
02/20/2014; 6:00 pm, P12N		at Oregon State	L 57–68	9–17 (2–12)	Gill Coliseum (3,618); Corvallis, OR
02/23/2014; 6:00 pm, P12N		at Oregon	L 53–67	9–18 (2–13)	Matthew Knight Arena (8,702); Eugene, OR
02/28/2014; 7:30 pm, P12N		at Washington; Rivalry	L 49–72	9–19 (2–14)	Alaska Airlines Arena (7,647); Seattle, WA
03/06/2014; 8:00 pm, ESPNU		USC	L 68–79	9–20 (2–15)	Beasley Coliseum (2,113); Pullman, WA
03/08/2014; 8:00 pm, FS1		UCLA	W 73–55	10–20 (3–15)	Beasley Coliseum (3,142); Pullman, WA
Pac-12 Conference tournament
03/12/2014; 8:30 pm, P12N		vs. Stanford; First round	L 63–74	10–21	MGM Grand Garden Arena (9,047); Paradise, NV
*Non-conference game. ^{#}Rankings from AP Poll. (#) Tournament seedings in parentheses. All times are in Pacific Time.
