= 2013–14 USC Trojans men's basketball team =

American college basketball season

2013–14 USC Trojans men's basketball
- Conference: Pac-12 Conference
- Record: 11–21 (2–16 Pac-12)
- Head coach: Andy Enfield
- Assistant coaches: Tony Bland; Jason Hart; Kevin Norris
- Home arena: Galen Center

2013–14 Pac-12 Conference men's basketball standings
	Conf.				Overall
Team	W		L	PCT	W		L	PCT
No. 4 Arizona	15	–	3	.833	33	–	5	.868
No. 20 UCLA †	12	–	6	.667	28	–	9	.757
Oregon	10	–	8	.556	24	–	10	.706
Colorado	10	–	8	.556	23	–	12	.657
Arizona State	10	–	8	.556	21	–	12	.636
Stanford	10	–	8	.556	23	–	13	.639
California	10	–	8	.556	21	–	14	.600
Utah	9	–	9	.500	21	–	12	.636
Washington	9	–	9	.500	17	–	15	.531
Oregon State	8	–	10	.444	16	–	16	.500
Washington State	3	–	15	.167	10	–	21	.323
USC	2	–	16	.111	11	–	21	.344
† Conference tournament winner Rankings from AP poll

The 2013–14 USC Trojans men's basketball team represented the University of Southern California during the 2013–14 NCAA Division I men's basketball season. They were led by former FGCU and first year head coach Andy Enfield. They played their home games at the Galen Center and are members of the Pac-12 Conference.

== Departures ==
Name	Number	Pos.	Height	Weight	Year	Hometown	Notes
Renaldo Woolridge	0	F	6'9"	220	Senior	Sherman, CA	Graduated
Jio Fontan	1	G	6'0"	175	RS Senior	Paterson, NJ	Graduated
Tyler Sugiyama	4	G	5'10"	150	RS Junior	Winnetka, IL	Graduated
Dewayne Dedmon	14	F	7'0"	240	RS Junior	Lancaster, CA	Declared for NBA
Aaron Fuller	21	F	6'6"	235	RS Senior	Mesa, AZ	Graduated
James Blasczyk	31	C	7'1"	260	Senior	Friendswood, TX	Graduated
Eric Wise	34	F	6'6"	240	RS Senior	Riverside, CA	Graduated

== Roster ==
2013–14 USC Trojans men's basketball team
Players
Coaches

Pos.	#	Name	Height	Weight	Year	Hometown
F	0	Darion Clark (W)	6 ft 7 in (2.01 m)	235 lb (107 kg)	So	Conyers, GA
G	1	Katin Reinhardt	6 ft 5 in (1.96 m)	210 lb (95 kg)	So	Dana Point, CA
F	2	Roschon Prince	6 ft 5 in (1.96 m)	210 lb (95 kg)	Fr	Long Beach, CA
G	3	Chass Bryan	5 ft 9 in (1.75 m)	165 lb (75 kg)	So	Oak Park, CA
G	5	Kahlil Dukes	5 ft 11 in (1.8 m)	180 lb (82 kg)	Fr	Hartford, CT
G	10	Pe'Shon Howard	6 ft 3 in (1.91 m)	190 lb (86 kg)	Sr	Los Angeles, CA
G	12	Julian Jacobs	6 ft 3 in (1.91 m)	175 lb (79 kg)	Fr	Las Vegas, NV
F	13	Samar Dhillon	6 ft 7 in (2.01 m)	200 lb (91 kg)	Fr	Sacramento, CA
F	14	Strahinja Gavrilović	6 ft 9 in (2.06 m)	225 lb (102 kg)	So	Kragujevac, SER
G	15	Brendyn Taylor	6 ft 2 in (1.88 m)	185 lb (84 kg)	So	Los Angeles, CA
G	20	J.T. Terrell	6 ft 3 in (1.91 m)	185 lb (84 kg)	Sr	Burlington, NC
G	21	Devon Pflueger	6 ft 6 in (1.98 m)	195 lb (88 kg)	Fr	San Juan Capistrano, CA
G	22	Byron Wesley	6 ft 5 in (1.96 m)	210 lb (95 kg)	Jr	Rancho Cucamonga, CA
G	24	Daniel Munoz	5 ft 10 in (1.78 m)	175 lb (79 kg)	RS Sr	Coto de Caza, CA
F	32	Nikola Jovanović	6 ft 10 in (2.08 m)	215 lb (98 kg)	Fr	Belgrade, SER
C	33	D.J. Haley	7 ft 0 in (2.13 m)	250 lb (113 kg)	Sr	Palmdale, CA
C	55	Omar Oraby	7 ft 2 in (2.18 m)	270 lb (122 kg)	Sr	Cairo, EGY

Head coach

- Andy Enfield (Johns Hopkins)

Assistant coach(es)

- Tony Bland (San Diego State)
- Jason Hart (Syracuse)
- Kevin Norris (Miami (FL))

Legend

- (C) Team captain
- (S) Suspended
- (I) Ineligible
- (W) Walk-on
- Injured
- Current redshirt

Roster

== Schedule and results ==
Date time, TV	Rank^{#}	Opponent^{#}	Result	Record	Site (attendance) city, state
Regular season
11/08/2013*; 6:05 pm, CBSSN		at Utah State	L 65–78	0–1	Smith Spectrum (9,935); Logan, UT
11/12/2013*; 8:00 pm, P12N		Cal State Northridge	W 95–79	1–1	Galen Center (4,116); Los Angeles, CA
11/15/2013*; 8:00 pm, P12N		Northern Arizona	W 67–63	2–1	Galen Center (3,821); Los Angeles, CA
11/19/2013*; 8:00 pm, P12N		Cal State Fullerton	W 76–62	3–1	Galen Center (3,152); Los Angeles, CA
11/21/2013*; 7:00 pm, P12N		West Alabama; Battle 4 Atlantis Opening Round	W 73–57	4–1	Galen Center (2,316); Los Angeles, CA
11/28/2013*; 10:00 am, AXS TV		vs. Villanova; Battle 4 Atlantis First Round	L 79–94	4–2	Imperial Arena (2,026); Nassau, BAH
11/29/2013*; 12:30 pm, AXS TV		vs. Wake Forest; Battle 4 Atlantis Consolation 2nd Round	L 63–77	4–3	Imperial Arena (1,538); Nassau, BAH
11/30/2013*; 10:00 am, AXS TV		vs. Xavier; Battle 4 Atlantis 7th place game	W 84–78	5–3	Imperial Arena (1,393); Nassau, BAH
12/08/2013*; 4:00 pm, P12N		Boston College	W 78–62	6–3	Galen Center (3,853); Los Angeles, CA
12/15/2013*; 7:00 pm, P12N		Cal State Bakersfield	W 63–59	7–3	Galen Center (2,468); Los Angeles, CA
12/19/2013*; 7:00 pm, Prime Ticket		at Long Beach State	L 71–72	7–4	Walter Pyramid (4,410); Long Beach, CA
12/22/2013*; 11:00 am, TWCS		at Dayton	W 79–76	8–4	UD Arena (12,240); Dayton, OH
12/29/2013*; 2:00 pm, P12N		Howard	W 82–60	9–4	Galen Center (5,563); Los Angeles, CA
01/05/2014; 12:00 pm, FS1		at UCLA	L 73–107	9–5 (0–1)	Pauley Pavilion (11,285); Los Angeles, CA
01/09/2014; 7:00 pm, P12N		Arizona State	L 60–79	9–6 (0–2)	Galen Center (3,623); Los Angeles, CA
01/12/2014; 6:00 pm, P12N		No. 1 Arizona	L 53–73	9–7 (0–3)	Galen Center (8,347); Los Angeles, CA
01/16/2014; 7:00 pm, P12N		at Utah	L 66–84	9–8 (0–4)	Jon M. Huntsman Center (9,231); Salt Lake City, UT
01/18/2014; 11:00 am, FS1		at No. 21 Colorado	L 62–83	9–9 (0–5)	Coors Events Center (9,583); Boulder, CO
01/22/2014; 8:00 pm, ESPNU		California	W 77–69	10–9 (1–5)	Galen Center (3,253); Los Angeles, CA
01/26/2014; 2:00 pm, P12N		Stanford	W 79–71 ^{OT}	10–10 (1–6)	Galen Center (5,378); Los Angeles, CA
01/30/2014; 6:00 pm, P12N		at Oregon State	L 75–76 ^{OT}	10–11 (1–7)	Gill Coliseum (3,774); Corvallis, OR
02/01/2014; 5:00 pm, P12N		at Oregon	L 66–78	10–12 (1–8)	Matthew Knight Arena (11,178); Eugene, OR
02/08/2014; 7:30 pm, P12N		UCLA	L 73–83	10–13 (1–9)	Galen Center (9,216); Los Angeles, CA
02/13/2014; 7:30 pm, P12N		Utah	L 71–79	10–14 (1–10)	Galen Center (3,217); Los Angeles, CA
02/16/2014; 5:00 pm, ESPNU		Colorado	L 74–83	10–15 (1–11)	Galen Center (3,187); Los Angeles, CA
02/20/2014; 8:00 pm, P12N		at Stanford	L 59–80	10–16 (1–12)	Maples Pavilion (4,345); Stanford, CA
02/23/2014; 5:00 pm, FS1		at California	L 64–77	10–17 (1–13)	Haas Pavilion (9,687); Berkeley, CA
02/27/2014; 8:00 pm, P12N		Oregon State	L 66–76	10–18 (1–14)	Galen Center (3,352); Los Angeles, CA
03/01/2014; 1:00 pm, P12N		Oregon	L 63–78	10–19 (1–15)	Galen Center (4,781); Los Angeles, CA
03/06/2014; 8:00 pm, ESPNU		at Washington State	W 79–68	11–19 (2–15)	Beasley Coliseum; Pullman, WA
03/08/2014; 1:30 pm, P12N		at Washington	L 75–82	11–20 (2–16)	Alaska Airlines Arena; Seattle, WA
Pac-12 tournament
03/12/2014; 2:30 pm		vs. Colorado; First round	L 56–59	11–21	MGM Grand Garden Arena; Paradise, NV
*Non-conference game. ^{#}Rankings from AP Poll. (#) Tournament seedings in parentheses. All times are in Pacific Time.
