= 2013–14 Arizona State Sun Devils men's basketball team =

American college basketball season

2013–14 Arizona State Sun Devils men's basketball

NCAA tournament, round of 64
- Conference: Pac-12 Conference
- Record: 21–12 (10–8 Pac-12)
- Head coach: Herb Sendek (8th season)
- Assistant coaches: Dedrique Taylor; Eric Musselman; Larry Greer
- Home arena: Wells Fargo Arena

2013–14 Pac-12 Conference men's basketball standings
	Conf.				Overall
Team	W		L	PCT	W		L	PCT
No. 4 Arizona	15	–	3	.833	33	–	5	.868
No. 20 UCLA †	12	–	6	.667	28	–	9	.757
Oregon	10	–	8	.556	24	–	10	.706
Colorado	10	–	8	.556	23	–	12	.657
Arizona State	10	–	8	.556	21	–	12	.636
Stanford	10	–	8	.556	23	–	13	.639
California	10	–	8	.556	21	–	14	.600
Utah	9	–	9	.500	21	–	12	.636
Washington	9	–	9	.500	17	–	15	.531
Oregon State	8	–	10	.444	16	–	16	.500
Washington State	3	–	15	.167	10	–	21	.323
USC	2	–	16	.111	11	–	21	.344
† Conference tournament winner Rankings from AP poll

The 2013–14 Arizona State Sun Devils men's basketball team represent Arizona State University during the 2013–14 NCAA Division I men's basketball season. The Sun Devils are led by eighth-year head coach Herb Sendek and play their home games at the Wells Fargo Arena in Tempe, Arizona. They are members of the Pac-12 Conference.

== Departures ==
Name	Number	Pos.	Height	Weight	Year	Hometown	Notes
Ruslan Pateev	23	C	7'0"	255	Senior	Moscow, Russia	Graduated
Carrick Felix	0	G/F	6'6"	197	Senior	Goodyear, Arizona	Graduated
Chris Colvin	2	G	6'2"	185	Senior	Chicago, Illinois	Graduated
Evan Gordon	10	G	6'1"	187	Senior	Indianapolis, Indiana	Transfer.
Joey Hormes	12	G	6'0"	190	Senior	Phoenix, Arizona	Graduated
Kenny Martin	41	F	6'8"	220	Freshman	Glendale, Arizona	Transfer.

== Recruits ==
College recruiting information
Name	Hometown	School	Height	Weight	Commit date
Chance Murray; SG	Los Angeles, California	Price High School	6 ft 3 in (1.91 m)	180 lb (82 kg)	Sep 9, 2012
Chance Murray; SG	Recruit ratings: Scout: Rivals: (69)				
Egor Koulechov; SF	Weston, Florida	The Sagemont School	6 ft 5 in (1.96 m)	190 lb (86 kg)	May 16, 2012
Egor Koulechov; SF	Recruit ratings: Scout: Rivals: (68)				
Overall recruit ranking:
Note: In many cases, Scout, Rivals, 247Sports, On3, and ESPN may conflict in their listings of height and weight.; In these cases, the average was taken. ESPN grades are on a 100-point scale.; Sources: "2013 Arizona State Basketball Commits". Rivals.; "2013 Arizona State Basketball Commits". Scout.; "ESPN". ESPN.; "Scout.com Team Recruiting Rankings". Scout.; "2013 Team Ranking". Rivals.

== Roster ==
2013–14 Arizona State Sun Devils men's basketball team
Players
Coaches

Pos.	#	Name	Height	Weight	Year	Previous school	Hometown
G	1	Jahii Carson	5 ft 10 in (1.78 m)	180 lb (82 kg)	RS So	Mesa HS	Mesa, Arizona
G	3	Chance Murray	6 ft 2 in (1.88 m)	180 lb (82 kg)	Fr	Frederick K. C. Price III School	Los Angeles, California
G	4	Bo Barnes	6 ft 4 in (1.93 m)	195 lb (88 kg)	Jr	Westwind Prep/Hawaii	Scottsdale, Arizona
F	5	Richie Edwards	6 ft 7 in (2.01 m)	220 lb (100 kg)	RS Sr	Lakeland Senior HS/Valparaiso	Lakeland, Florida
G	11	Calaen Robinson	6 ft 2 in (1.88 m)	190 lb (86 kg)	RS Fr	Corona del Sol HS	Tempe, Arizona
C	13	Jordan Bachynski	7 ft 2 in (2.18 m)	248 lb (112 kg)	Sr	Centennial HS	Calgary, Alberta
G/F	15	Egor Koulechov	6 ft 5 in (1.96 m)	205 lb (93 kg)	Fr	The Sagemont School	Weston, Florida
F/C	21	Eric Jacobsen	6 ft 10 in (2.08 m)	235 lb (107 kg)	So	Hamilton HS	Chandler, Arizona
G	22	Jarrett Upchurch	6 ft 1 in (1.85 m)	192 lb (87 kg)	Sr	Chaparral HS/Eastern Wyoming College	Scottsdale, Arizona
F	24	Sai Tummala	6 ft 7 in (2.01 m)	215 lb (98 kg)	So	Brophy College Prep/Salt Lake C.C.	Phoenix, Arizona
F	31	Jonathan Gilling	6 ft 7 in (2.01 m)	219 lb (99 kg)	Jr	Hørsholm 76ers	Rungsted Kyst, Denmark
F	32	Brandan Kearney	6 ft 5 in (1.96 m)	190 lb (86 kg)	Jr	Southeastern HS/Michigan State	Detroit, Michigan
F	33	Dave Whitmore	6 ft 6 in (1.98 m)	215 lb (98 kg)	Sr	Corona del Sol HS	Tempe, Arizona
G	34	Jermaine Marshall	6 ft 4 in (1.93 m)	215 lb (98 kg)	Sr	Red Land HS/Penn State	Goldsboro, Pennsylvania
F	40	Shaquielle McKissic	6 ft 5 in (1.96 m)	200 lb (91 kg)	Sr	Kentridge HS/Edmonds C.C.	Lynnwood, Washington

Head coach

- Herb Sendek (Carnegie Mellon)

Assistant coach(es)

- Dedrique Taylor (UC Davis)
- Eric Musselman (San Diego)
- Larry Greer (Northeastern)

Legend

- (C) Team captain
- (S) Suspended
- (I) Ineligible
- (W) Walk-on
- Injured
- Current redshirt

Roster
Last update: 12/01/13

=== Depth chart ===
Pos.	Starting 5	Bench 1	Bench 2	Bench 3
C	Jordan Bachynski
PF	Jonathan Gilling	Eric Jacobson	Richie Edwards
SF	Shaquielle McKissic	Egor Koulechov	Sai Tummala	Dave Whitmore
SG	Jermaine Marshall	Bo Barnes	Brandan Kearney
PG	Jahii Carson	Calaen Robinson	Chance Murray	Jarrett Upchurch

== Schedule ==
Date time, TV	Rank^{#}	Opponent^{#}	Result	Record	Site (attendance) city, state
Non-conference regular season
11/10/2013*; 6:00 pm, P12N		UMBC	W 96–61	1–0	Wells Fargo Arena (5,086); Tempe, AZ
11/12/2013*; 7:00 pm, P12N		Miami (OH)	W 90–54	2–0	Wells Fargo Arena (4,796); Tempe, AZ
11/15/2013*; 7:00 pm, P12N		Idaho State	W 88–60	3–0	Wells Fargo Arena (5,899); Tempe, AZ
11/19/2013*; 8:05 pm, CBSSN		at UNLV	W 86–80	4–0	Thomas & Mack Center (12,915); Paradise, NV
11/22/2013*; 8:00 pm, P12N		Bradley	W 70–58	5–0	Wells Fargo Arena (5,570); Tempe, AZ
11/25/2013*; 7:00 pm, FS1		No. 25 Marquette; Wooden Legacy	W 79–77	6–0	Wells Fargo Arena (9,155); Tempe, AZ
11/28/2013*; 9:00 pm, ESPN2		vs. No. 20 Creighton; Wooden Legacy First Round	L 60–88	6–1	Titan Gym (1,865); Fullerton, CA
11/29/2013*; 10:00 pm, ESPNU		vs. College of Charleston; Wooden Legacy Consolation 2nd Round	W 80–58	7–1	Titan Gym (3,287); Fullerton, CA
12/01/2013*; 12:00 pm, ESPNU		vs. Miami (FL); Wooden Legacy 5th place game	L 57–60	7–2	Honda Center (N/A); Anaheim, CA
12/06/2013*; 5:00 pm, FS1		at DePaul	W 78–56	8–2	Allstate Arena (6,888); Rosemont, IL
12/14/2013*; 12:00 pm, P12N		Grambling State	W 97–55	9–2	Wells Fargo Arena (4,714); Tempe, AZ
12/21/2013*; 4:30 pm, P12N		Texas Tech	W 76–62	10–2	Wells Fargo Arena (6,039); Tempe, AZ
12/28/2013*; 12:00 pm, P12N		UC Irvine	W 74–61	11–2	Wells Fargo Arena (5,883); Tempe, AZ
Pac-12 regular season
01/02/2014; 6:00 pm, ESPNU		Washington	L 65–76	11–3 (0–1)	Wells Fargo Arena (5,788); Tempe, AZ
01/05/2014; 4:00 pm, ESPNU		Washington State	W 66–47	12–3 (1–1)	Wells Fargo Arena (5,072); Tempe, AZ
01/09/2014; 8:00 pm, P12N		at USC	W 79–60	13–3 (2–1)	Galen Center (3,623); Los Angeles, CA
01/12/2014; 8:00 pm, ESPNU		at UCLA	L 72–87	13–4 (2–2)	Pauley Pavilion (8,003); Los Angeles, CA
01/16/2014; 7:00 pm, FS1		at No. 1 Arizona; Territorial Cup	L 68–91	13–5 (2–3)	McKale Center (14,545); Tucson, AZ
01/23/2014; 7:00 pm, P12N		Utah	W 79–75	14–5 (3–3)	Wells Fargo Arena (7,689); Tempe, AZ
01/25/2014; 5:00 pm, P12N		Colorado	W 72–51	15–5 (4–3)	Wells Fargo Arena (8,352); Tempe, AZ
01/29/2014; 9:00 pm, ESPNU		at California	W 89–79 ^{OT}	16–5 (5–3)	Haas Pavilion (7,791); Berkeley, CA
02/01/2014; 2:00 pm, P12N		at Stanford	L 70–76	16–6 (5–4)	Maples Pavilion (5,497); Stanford, CA
02/06/2014; 9:00 pm, FS1		Oregon State	W 86–82 ^{OT}	17–6 (6–4)	Wells Fargo Arena (5,815); Tempe, AZ
02/08/2014; 3:00 pm, FS1		Oregon	W 74–72	18–6 (7–4)	Wells Fargo Arena (8,583); Tempe, AZ
02/14/2014; 7:00 pm, ESPN		No. 2 Arizona; Territorial Cup	W 69–66 ^{2OT}	19–6 (8–4)	Wells Fargo Arena (10,699); Tempe, AZ
02/19/2014; 9:00 pm, ESPNU		at Colorado	L 52–61	19–7 (8–5)	Coors Events Center (9,666); Boulder, CO
02/23/2014; 6:00 pm, ESPNU		at Utah	W 86–63	19–8 (8–6)	Jon M. Huntsman Center (10,401); Salt Lake City, UT
02/26/2014; 9:00 pm, ESPNU		Stanford	W 76–64	20–8 (9–6)	Wells Fargo Arena (6,227); Tempe, AZ
03/01/2014; 4:00 pm, P12N		California	W 78–60	21–8 (10–6)	Wells Fargo Arena (8,313); Tempe, AZ
03/04/2014; 9:00 pm, FS1		at Oregon	L 78–85	21–9 (10–7)	Matthew Knight Arena (9,125); Eugene, OR
03/08/2014; 2:30 pm, P12N		at Oregon State	L 76–78 ^{OT}	21–10 (10–8)	Gill Coliseum (3,927); Corvallis, OR
Pac-12 tournament
03/13/2014; 8:30 pm, FS1	No. (3)	vs. No. (6) Stanford; Quarterfinals	L 58-79	21–11	MGM Grand Garden Arena (12,916); Paradise, NV
NCAA tournament
03/20/2014*; 6:40 pm, CBS	No. (10 MW)	vs. (7 MW) Texas; Second round	L 85–87	21–12	BMO Harris Bradley Center; Milwaukee, WI
*Non-conference game. ^{#}Rankings from AP Poll, (#) during NCAA Tournament is seed within region MW=Midwest Region. (#) Tournament seedings in parentheses. All times are in Mountain Time.
