= 2013–14 Stanford Cardinal men's basketball team =

American college basketball season

2013–14 Stanford Cardinal men's basketball

NCAA tournament, Sweet Sixteen
- Conference: Pac-12 Conference

Ranking
- Coaches: No. 24
- Record: 23–13 (10–8 Pac-12)
- Head coach: Johnny Dawkins
- Assistant coaches: Tim Toole; Charles Payne; Mike Schrage
- Home arena: Maples Pavilion

2013–14 Pac-12 Conference men's basketball standings
	Conf.				Overall
Team	W		L	PCT	W		L	PCT
No. 4 Arizona	15	–	3	.833	33	–	5	.868
No. 20 UCLA †	12	–	6	.667	28	–	9	.757
Oregon	10	–	8	.556	24	–	10	.706
Colorado	10	–	8	.556	23	–	12	.657
Arizona State	10	–	8	.556	21	–	12	.636
Stanford	10	–	8	.556	23	–	13	.639
California	10	–	8	.556	21	–	14	.600
Utah	9	–	9	.500	21	–	12	.636
Washington	9	–	9	.500	17	–	15	.531
Oregon State	8	–	10	.444	16	–	16	.500
Washington State	3	–	15	.167	10	–	21	.323
USC	2	–	16	.111	11	–	21	.344
† Conference tournament winner Rankings from AP poll

The 2013–14 Stanford Cardinal men's basketball team represented Stanford University during the 2013–14 NCAA Division I men's basketball season. The Cardinal, led by sixth year head coach Johnny Dawkins, played their home games at Maples Pavilion and were members of the Pac-12 Conference. The team finished with an overall of record 23–13 and were 10–8 in conference play

Stanford lost in the semifinals of the Pac-12 tournament to UCLA 84–59 As a #10 seed they advanced to the Sweet Sixteen but lost to Dayton 72–62.

== Roster ==
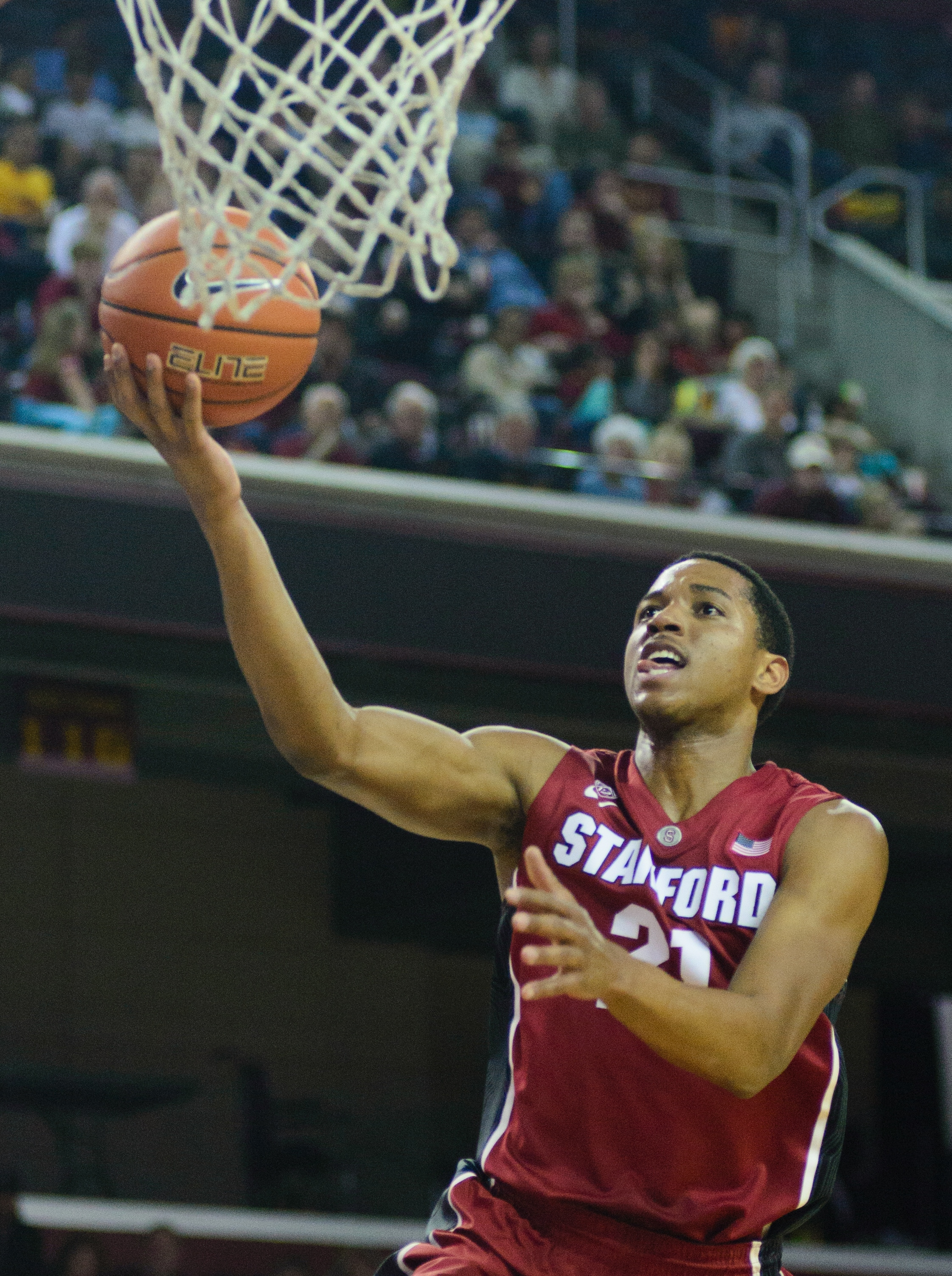
Anthony Brown

Number	Name	Position	Height	Weight	Year	Hometown
0	Schuyler Rimmer	Center	6-10	255	Freshman	Orlando, Florida
1	Christian Sanders	Guard	6-4	185	Sophomore	Houston, Texas
2	Aaron Bright	Guard	5–11	178	Senior	Bellevue, Washington
3	Malcolm Allen	Guard	6–1	175	Freshman	Las Vegas Nevada
4	Stefan Nastić	Center	6–11	245	RS Junior	Thornhill, Ontario, Canada
5	Chasson Randle	Guard	6–2	185	Junior	Rock Island, Illinois
10	Robbie Lemons	Guard	6–3	205	Senior	Carmichael, California
11	Andy Brown	Forward	6–7	215	RS Senior	Yorba Linda, California
14	Jack Ryan	Guard/Forward	6–8	210	Junior	Glenview, Illinois
15	Marcus Allen	Guard	6–3	190	Freshman	Las Vegas, Nevada
20	Wade Morgan	Guard	6-1	175	Junior	South Orange, New Jersey
21	Anthony Brown	Guard/Forward	6–6	215	RS Junior	Huntington Beach, California
24	Josh Huestis	Forward	6–7	230	Senior	Great Falls, Montana
25	Rosco Allen	Forward	6–9	220	Sophomore	Budapest, Hungary
30	Grant Verhoeven	Center	6–9	245	Sophomore	Visalia, California
31	Scott Woods	Forward	6–9	210	Freshman	Simi Valley, California
33	Dwight Powell	Forward	6–10	240	Senior	Toronto, Ontario, Canada
40	John Gage	Forward/Center	6–10	225	Senior	Vashon Island, Washington
44	Elliott Bullock	Forward/Center	6-11	235	Junior	Salt Lake City, Utah

== Schedule ==
Date time, TV	Rank^{#}	Opponent^{#}	Result	Record	Site (attendance) city, state
Exhibition
11/02/2013*; 2:00 pm		Seattle Pacific	W 89–61	–	Maples Pavilion (3,637); Stanford, CA
Non-conference regular season
11/08/2013*; 7:00 pm, P12N		Bucknell	W 72–68	1–0	Maples Pavilion (7,233); Stanford, CA
11/11/2013*; 8:00 pm, ESPN2		BYU; ESPN College Hoops Tip-Off Marathon	L 103–112	1–1	Maples Pavilion (5,994); Stanford, CA
11/14/2013*; 8:00 pm, ESPNU		Northwestern	W 71–58	2–1	Maples Pavilion (4,692); Stanford, CA
11/17/2013*; 11:00 am, RTRM		at Denver	W 66–57	3–1	Magness Arena (4,222); Denver, CO
11/21/2013*; 7:00 pm, P12N		Texas Southern; Legends Classic	W 97–71	4–1	Maples Pavilion (3,644); Stanford, CA
11/25/2013*; 6:30 pm, ESPN2		vs. Houston; Legends Classic Semifinals	W 86–76	5–1	Barclays Center (4,142); Brooklyn, NY
11/26/2013*; 6:30 pm, ESPNU		vs. Pittsburgh; Legends Classic Championship	L 67–88	5–2	Barclays Center (4,029); Brooklyn, NY
12/01/2013*; 5:00 pm, P12N		South Dakota State; Legends Classic	W 92–60	6–2	Maples Pavilion (3,887); Stanford, CA
12/14/2013*; 5:00 pm, P12N		UC Davis	W 83–56	7–2	Maples Pavilion (4,045); Stanford, CA
12/18/2013*; 6:00 pm, ESPN2		at No. 10 UConn	W 53–51	8–2	XL Center (11,140); Hartford, CT
12/21/2013*; 5:00 pm, FS1		vs. Michigan; Brooklyn Hoops Holiday Invitational	L 65–68	8–3	Barclays Center (11,039); Brooklyn, NY
12/29/2013*; 4:00 pm, P12N		Cal Poly	W 79–62	9–3	Maples Pavilion (4,799); Stanford, CA
Pac-12 regular season
01/02/2014; 6:00 pm, FS1		California	L 62–69	9–4 (0–1)	Maples Pavilion (4,234); Stanford, CA
01/09/2014; 7:00 pm, P12N		at Oregon State	L 72–81	9–5 (0–2)	Gill Coliseum (4,308); Corvallis, OR
01/12/2014; 2:00 pm, FS1		at No. 17 Oregon	W 82–80	10–5 (1–2)	Matthew Knight Arena (8,852); Eugene, OR
01/15/2014; 7:00 pm, P12N		Washington State	W 80–48	11–5 (2–2)	Maples Pavilion (3,908); Stanford, CA
01/18/2014; 8:00 pm, ESPNU		Washington	W 79–67	12–5 (3–2)	Maples Pavilion (4,503); Stanford, CA
01/23/2014; 8:00 pm, P12N		at UCLA	L 74–91	12–6 (3–3)	Pauley Pavilion (9,068); Los Angeles, CA
01/26/2014; 8:00 pm, P12N		at USC	W 79–71	13–6 (4–3)	Galen Center (5,378); Los Angeles, CA
01/29/2014; 6:00 pm, ESPN2		No. 1 Arizona	L 57–60	13–7 (4–4)	Maples Pavilion (7,233); Stanford, CA
02/01/2014; 1:00 pm, P12N		Arizona State	W 76–70	14–7 (5–4)	Maples Pavilion (5,497); Stanford, CA
02/05/2014; 6:00 pm, ESPN2		at California	W 80–69	15–7 (6–4)	Haas Pavilion (9,115); Berkeley, CA
02/12/2014; 6:00 pm, ESPN		at Washington	L 60–64	15–8 (6–5)	Alaska Airlines Arena (6,981); Seattle, WA
02/15/2014; 4:00 pm, P12N		at Washington State	W 69–56	16–8 (7–5)	Beasley Coliseum (3,054); Pullman, WA
02/20/2014; 8:00 pm, P12N		USC	W 80–59	17–8 (8–5)	Maples Pavilion (4,345); Stanford, CA
02/22/2014; 3:00 pm, ESPN2		No. 23 UCLA	W 83–74	18–8 (9–5)	Maples Pavilion (7,031); Stanford, CA
02/26/2014; 8:00 pm, P12N		at Arizona State	L 64–76	18–9 (9–6)	Wells Fargo Arena (6,227); Tempe, AZ
03/02/2014; 5:00 pm, ESPNU		at No. 3 Arizona	L 66–79	18–10 (9–7)	McKale Center (14,545); Tucson, AZ
03/05/2014; 1:00 pm, ESPN2		Colorado	L 56–59	18–11 (9–8)	Maples Pavilion (4,558); Stanford, CA
03/08/2014; 11:30 am, P12N		Utah	W 61–60	19–11 (10–8)	Maples Pavilion (6,167); Stanford, CA
Pac-12 Tournament
03/12/2014; 8:30 pm, P12N		vs. Washington State; First round	W 74–63	20–11	MGM Grand Garden Arena (9,047); Paradise, NV
03/13/2014; 8:30 pm, FS1		vs. Arizona State; Quarterfinals	W 79–58	21–11	MGM Grand Garden Arena (12,916); Paradise, NV
03/14/2014; 8:30 pm, FS1		vs. UCLA; Semifinals	L 59–84	21–12	MGM Grand Garden Arena (12,916); Paradise, NV
NCAA tournament
03/21/2014*; 10:40 am, TBS	(10 S)	vs. (7 S) No. 17 New Mexico; Second round	W 58–53	22–12	Scottrade Center (17,955); St. Louis, MO
03/23/2014*; 9:15 am, CBS	(10 S)	vs. (2 S) No. 10 Kansas; Third round	W 60–57	23–12	Scottrade Center (19,676); St. Louis, MO
03/27/2014*; 4:15 pm, CBS	(10 S)	vs. (11 S) Dayton; Sweet Sixteen	L 72–82	23–13	FedEx Forum (14,991); Memphis TN
*Non-conference game. ^{#}Rankings from AP Poll, (#) during NCAA Tournament is seed within region S=South. (#) Tournament seedings in parentheses. All times are in Pacific Time.

== See also ==
- 2013–14 Stanford Cardinal women's basketball team

== Notes ==
- March 14, 2014 – UCLA's 84–59 win over Stanford was the largest margin in Pac-12 tournament history
