= 2013–14 California Golden Bears men's basketball team =

American college basketball season

2013–14 California Golden Bears men's basketball

NIT, Quarterfinals
- Conference: Pac-12 Conference
- Record: 21–14 (10–8 Pac-12)
- Head coach: Mike Montgomery
- Assistant coaches: Travis DeCuire; Gregg Gottlieb; John Montgomery
- Home arena: Haas Pavilion

2013–14 Pac-12 Conference men's basketball standings
	Conf.				Overall
Team	W		L	PCT	W		L	PCT
No. 4 Arizona	15	–	3	.833	33	–	5	.868
No. 20 UCLA †	12	–	6	.667	28	–	9	.757
Oregon	10	–	8	.556	24	–	10	.706
Colorado	10	–	8	.556	23	–	12	.657
Arizona State	10	–	8	.556	21	–	12	.636
Stanford	10	–	8	.556	23	–	13	.639
California	10	–	8	.556	21	–	14	.600
Utah	9	–	9	.500	21	–	12	.636
Washington	9	–	9	.500	17	–	15	.531
Oregon State	8	–	10	.444	16	–	16	.500
Washington State	3	–	15	.167	10	–	21	.323
USC	2	–	16	.111	11	–	21	.344
† Conference tournament winner Rankings from AP poll

The 2013–14 California Golden Bears men's basketball team represented the University of California, Berkeley in the 2013–14 NCAA Division I men's basketball season. This was head coach Mike Montgomery's sixth and final season at California. The Golden Bears played their home games at Haas Pavilion and participated in the Pac-12 Conference. They finished the season 21–14, 10–8 in Pac-12 play (which included a home victory against #1 ranked Arizona) to finish in a five-way tie for third place. They lost in the quarterfinals of the Pac-12 tournament to Colorado. They received an at-large bid to the 2014 National Invitation Tournament, where they defeated Utah Valley in the first round and Arkansas in the second round before losing in the quarterfinals to SMU.

== Off-season ==
=== Departures ===
Name	Number	Pos.	Height	Weight	Year	Hometown	Reason for departure
Robert Thurman	34	PF	6'10"	265	Senior	North Edwards, CA	Graduated
Bak Bak	15	PF	6'9"	240	Senior	Wau, SS	Graduated
Brandon Smith	12	PG	6'0"	180	Senior	San Ramon, CA	Graduated
Allen Crabbe	23	SG	6'6"	197	Junior	Los Angeles, CA	Declared for 2013 NBA draft

=== Recruiting class ===
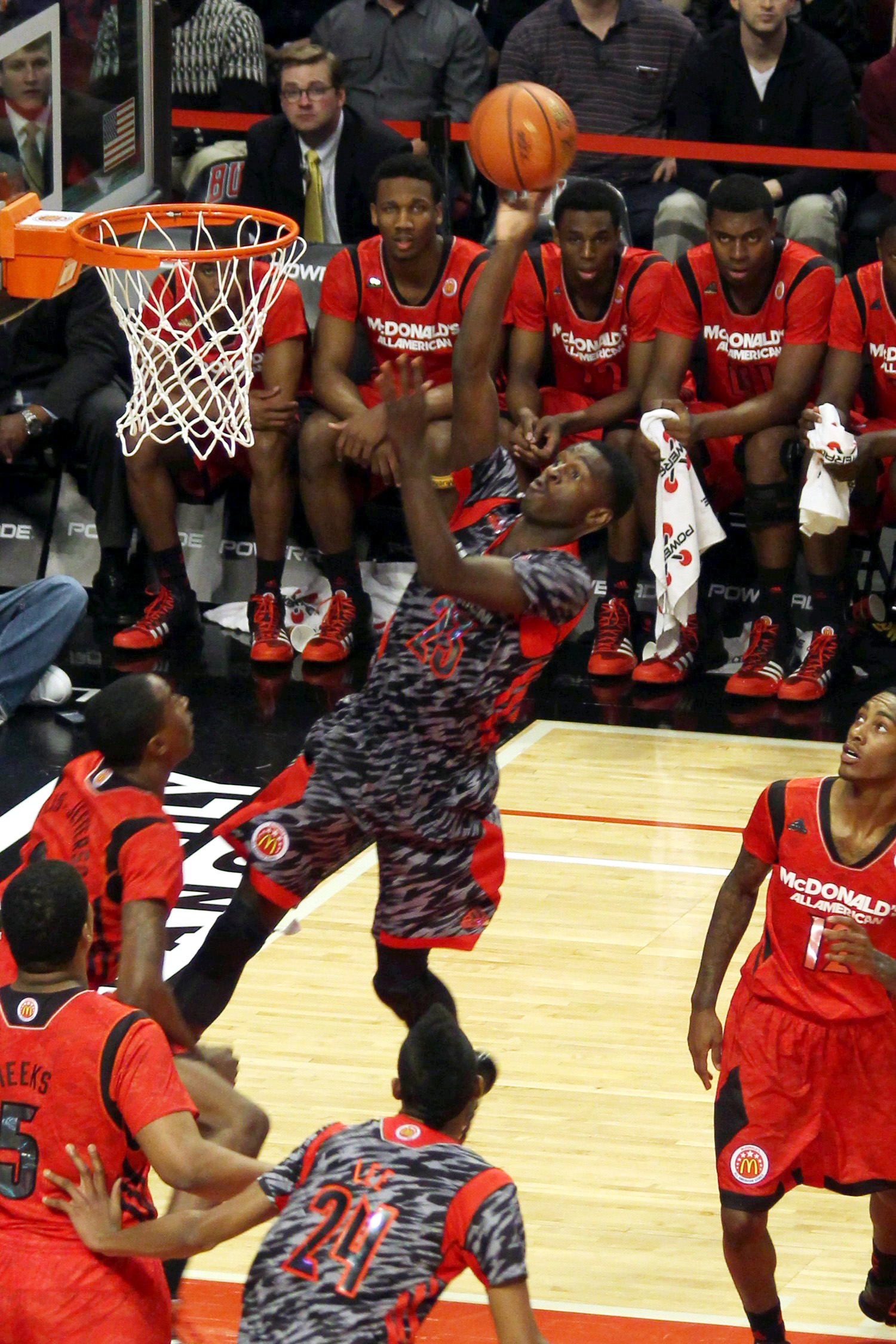
Jabari Bird in the 2013 McDonald's All-American Boys Game

College recruiting
Name	Hometown	School	Height	Weight	Commit date
Jabari Bird; SG	Richmond, CA	Salesian High School	6 ft 6 in (1.98 m)	190 lb (86 kg)	Sep 5, 2012
Jabari Bird; SG	Recruit ratings: Scout: Rivals: (89)				
Sam Singer; SG	Miami, FL	Ransom Everglades School	6 ft 5 in (1.96 m)	185 lb (84 kg)	Oct 2, 2012
Sam Singer; SG	Recruit ratings: Scout: Rivals: (75)				
Jordan Mathews; SG	Santa Monica, CA	Santa Monica High School	6 ft 3 in (1.91 m)	185 lb (84 kg)	Sep 9, 2012
Jordan Mathews; SG	Recruit ratings: Scout: Rivals: (74)				
Kameron Rooks; C	San Marcos, CA	Mission Hills High School	7 ft 0 in (2.13 m)	275 lb (125 kg)	Jan 1, 2013
Kameron Rooks; C	Recruit ratings: Scout: Rivals: (70)				
Roger Moute a Bidias; SF	Fitchburg, MA	Notre Dame Prep	6 ft 7 in (2.01 m)	180 lb (82 kg)	May 14, 2013
Roger Moute a Bidias; SF	Recruit ratings: Scout: Rivals: (70)				
Overall recruit ranking:
Note: In many cases, Scout, Rivals, 247Sports, On3, and ESPN may conflict in their listings of height and weight.; In these cases, the average was taken. ESPN grades are on a 100-point scale.; Sources: "2013 Cal Basketball Commits". Rivals.; "2013 Cal Basketball Commits". Scout.; "2013 Cal Basketball Commits". ESPN.; "Scout.com Team Recruiting Rankings". Scout.; "2013 Team Ranking". Rivals.

== Roster ==
2013–14 California Golden Bears men's basketball team
Players
Coaches

Pos.	#	Name	Height	Weight	Year	Previous school	Hometown
G	1	Justin Cobbs	6 ft 3 in (1.91 m)	190 lb (86 kg)	RS Sr	Bishops Montgomery HS/Minnesota	Los Angeles, CA
G	2	Sam Singer	6 ft 4 in (1.93 m)	185 lb (84 kg)	Fr	Ransom Everglades School	Miami, FL
G	3	Tyrone Wallace	6 ft 4 in (1.93 m)	186 lb (84 kg)	So	Bakersfield HS	Bakersfield, CA
G	10	Garrett Galvin	6 ft 4 in (1.93 m)	198 lb (90 kg)	So	Torrey Pines HS	Del Mar, CA
F	12	Roger Moute a Bidias	6 ft 7 in (2.01 m)	200 lb (91 kg)	Fr	Notre Dame Prep	Fitchburg, MA
F	14	Christian Behrens	6 ft 9 in (2.06 m)	225 lb (102 kg)	RS So	Tahoma HS	Maple Valley, WA
G	15	Jordan Mathews	6 ft 3 in (1.91 m)	195 lb (88 kg)	Fr	Santa Monica HS	Santa Monica, CA
G	21	Jeff Powers	6 ft 7 in (2.01 m)	223 lb (101 kg)	RS Sr	De La Salle HS/Denver	Clayton, CA
G	23	Jabari Bird	6 ft 6 in (1.98 m)	190 lb (86 kg)	Fr	Richmond HS	Richmond, CA
G	24	Ricky Kreklow	6 ft 6 in (1.98 m)	210 lb (95 kg)	RS Jr	Rock Bridge HS/Missouri	Columbia, MO
F	35	Richard Solomon	6 ft 10 in (2.08 m)	235 lb (107 kg)	Sr	Frederick Price HS	Los Angeles, CA
C	44	Kameron Rooks	7 ft 0 in (2.13 m)	270 lb (122 kg)	Fr	Mission Hills HS	San Marcos, CA
F	45	David Kravish	6 ft 9 in (2.06 m)	221 lb (100 kg)	Jr	Lee's Summit North HS	Lee's Summit, MO

Head coach

- Mike Montgomery (Colorado State)

Assistant coach(es)

- Gregg Gottlieb (UCLA)
- Travis DeCuire (Montana)
- John Montgomery (Loyola Marymount)

Legend

- (C) Team captain
- (S) Suspended
- (I) Ineligible
- (W) Walk-on
- Injured
- Current redshirt

Roster
Last update: 12/15/13

== Schedule ==
Date time, TV	Rank^{#}	Opponent^{#}	Result	Record	High points	High rebounds	High assists	Site (attendance) city, state
Exhibition
Oct. 31*; 7:00 p.m.		Humboldt State	W 83–61	–	15 – Mathews	9 – Solomon	5 – Singer	Haas Pavilion (4,616); Berkeley, CA
Non-conference regular season
Nov. 8*; 9:00 p.m., P12N		Coppin State	W 83–64	1–0	20 – Wallace	11 – Kravish	7 – Wallace	Haas Pavilion (8,249); Berkeley, CA
Nov. 12*; 8:00 p.m., P12N		Denver	W 77–50	2–0	16 – Wallace	16 – Solomon	6 – Cobbs	Haas Pavilion (4,930); Berkeley, CA
Nov. 15*; 8:00 p.m., P12N		Oakland; Maui Invitational opening round	W 64–60	3–0	24 – Bird	17 – Solomon	5 – Cobbs	Haas Pavilion (4,975); Berkeley, CA
Nov. 18*; 8:00 p.m., P12N		Southern Utah	W 75–47	4–0	15 – Wallace	8 – Kravish	8 – Cobbs	Haas Pavilion (5,224); Berkeley, CA
Nov. 25*; 12:00 pm, ESPN2		vs. Arkansas; Maui Invitational First Round	W 85–77	5–0	19 – Kravish	15 – Kravish	7 – Cobbs	Lahaina Civic Center (2,400); Maui, HI
Nov. 26*; 4:00 p.m., ESPN		vs. No. 8 Syracuse; Maui Invitational Semifinals	L 81–92	5–1	18 – Cobbs	7 – Bird	8 – Cobbs	Lahaina Civic Center (2,400); Maui, HI
Nov. 27*; 4:30 p.m., ESPN2		vs. Dayton; Maui Invitational 3rd Place Game	L 64–82	5–2	31 – Cobbs	14 – Kravish	2 – Bird	Lahaina Civic Center (2,400); Maui, HI
Dec. 2*; 7:00 p.m., P12N		UC Irvine	W 73–56	6–2	19 – Kravish	11 – Wallace	9 – Cobbs	Haas Pavilion (7,980); Berkeley, CA
Dec. 6*; 7:00 p.m.		at UC Santa Barbara	L 65–72	6–3	22 – Mathews	11 – Solomon	8 – Cobbs	The Thunderdome (4,017); Santa Barabara, CA
Dec. 10*; 8:00 p.m., P12N		Nevada	W 92–84	7–3	16 – Tied	8 – Kravish	8 – Cobbs	Haas Pavilion (8,679); Berkeley, CA
Dec. 14*; 3:00 pm, P12N		Fresno State	W 67–56	8–3	17 – Solomon	14 – Solomon	5 – Wallace	Haas Pavilion (9,342); Berkeley, CA
Dec. 22*; 4:00 p.m., FS1		at Creighton	L 54–68	8–4	13 – Cobbs	6 – Solomon	4 – Tied	CenturyLink Center (17,533); Omaha, NE
Dec. 28*; 3:00 p.m., P12N		Furman	W 90–60	9–4	18 – Tied	12 – Solomon	4 – Tied	Haas Pavilion (9,143); Berkeley, CA
Pac-12 regular season
Jan. 2; 6:00 p.m., FS1		at Stanford; Rivalry	W 69–62	10–4 (1–0)	20 – Wallace	13 – Solomon	5 – Cobbs	Maples Pavilion (4,234); Stanford, CA
Jan. 9; 8:00 p.m., FS1		at No. 17 Oregon	W 96–83	11–4 (2–0)	32 – Mathews	9 – Solomon	11 – Cobbs	Matthew Knight Arena (8,415); Eugene, OR
Jan. 11; 5:00 pm, ESPNU		at Oregon State	W 88–83	12–4 (3–0)	20 – Cobbs	8 – Solomon	9 – Cobbs	Gill Coliseum (5,125); Corvallis, OR
Jan. 15; 8:00 pm, ESPNU		Washington	W 82–56	13–4 (4–0)	14 – Wallace	12 – Solomon	6 – Cobbs	Haas Pavilion (8,072); Berkeley, CA
Jan. 18; 1:00 p.m., P12N		Washington State	W 76–55	14–4 (5–0)	16 – Cobbs	9 – Solomon	7 – Cobbs	Haas Pavilion (9,348); Berkeley, CA
Jan. 22; 8:00 p.m., ESPNU		at USC	L 69–77	14–5 (5–1)	22 – Cobbs	13 – Solomon	6 – Cobbs	Galen Center (3,523); Los Angeles, CA
Jan. 26; 5:00 p.m., ESPNU		at UCLA	L 64–76	14–6 (5–2)	18 – Mathews	13 – Solomon	3 – Tied	Pauley Pavilion (10,344); Los Angeles, CA
Jan. 29; 8:00 pm, ESPNU		Arizona State	L 79–89 ^{OT}	14–7 (5–3)	21 – Cobbs	13 – Solomon	6 – Solomon	Haas Pavilion (7,791); Berkeley, CA
Feb. 1; 7:30 p.m., P12N		No. 1 Arizona	W 60–58	15–7 (6–3)	19 – Cobbs	11 – Kravish	7 – Cobbs	Haas Pavilion (11,877); Berkeley, CA
Feb. 5; 6:00 pm, ESPN2		Stanford; Rivalry	L 69–80	15–8 (6–4)	24 – Cobbs	9 – Solomon	4 – Cobbs	Haas Pavilion (9,115); Berkeley, CA
Feb. 12; 8:00 p.m., ESPNU		at Washington State	W 80–76 ^{OT}	16–8 (7–4)	22 – Cobbs	11 – Solomon	7 – Cobbs	Beasley Coliseum (1,913); Pullman, WA
Feb. 15; 12:00 p.m., P12N		at Washington	W 72–59	17–8 (8–4)	20 – Wallace	8 – Wallace	7 – Cobbs	Alaska Airlines Arena (7,124); Seattle, WA
Feb. 19; 7:30 p.m., P12N		No. 23 UCLA	L 66–86	17–9 (8–5)	16 – Mathews	10 – Kravish	7 – Cobbs	Haas Pavilion (10,837); Berkeley, CA
Feb. 23; 5:00 pm, FS1		USC	W 77–64	18–9 (9–5)	22 – Cobbs	10 – Kravish	7 – Cobbs	Haas Pavilion (9,687); Berkeley, CA
Feb. 26; 6:00 p.m., ESPN2		at No. 3 Arizona	L 59–87	18–10 (9–6)	12 – Cobbs	7 – Tied	2 – Tied	McKale Center (14,545); Tucson, AZ
Mar. 1; 3:00 p.m., P12N		at Arizona State	L 60–78	18–11 (9–7)	15 – Cobbs	8 – Tied	2 – Tied	Wells Fargo Arena (8,313); Tempe, AZ
Mar. 5; 8:00 p.m., ESPNU		Utah	L 59–63	18–12 (9–8)	19 – Solomon	14 – Solomon	7 – Cobbs	Haas Pavilion (8,267); Berkeley, CA
Mar. 8; 3:30 p.m., P12N		Colorado	W 66–65 ^{OT}	19–12 (10–8)	21 – Cobbs	12 – Tied	6 – Kreklow	Haas Pavilion (9,422); Berkeley, CA
Pac-12 tournament
Mar. 13; 2:30 pm, P12N		vs. Colorado; Quarterfinals	L 56–59	19–13	21 – Cobbs	16 – Solomon	5 – Cobbs	MGM Grand Garden Arena (12,916); Paradise, NV
NIT
Mar. 19*; 7:30 pm, ESPN3	No. (2)	(7) Utah Valley; First round	W 77–64	20–13	14 – Kravish	10 – Kravish	7 – Cobbs	Haas Pavilion (1,670); Berkeley, CA
Mar. 24*; 8:00 p.m., ESPN2	No. (2)	(3) Arkansas; Second round	W 75–64	21–13	19 – Bird	8 – Tied	6 – Cobbs	Haas Pavilion (2,518); Berkeley, CA
Mar. 26*; 6:00 p.m., ESPN2	No. (2)	(1) SMU; Quarterfinals	L 65–67	21–14	20 – Bird	8 – Kravish	7 – Cobbs	Moody Coliseum (7,038); University Park, TX
*Non-conference game. ^{#}Rankings from AP Poll, (#) during NIT is seed within region. (#) Tournament seedings in parentheses. All times are in Pacific Time.

== See also ==
- 2013–14 California Golden Bears women's basketball team
