= 2013–14 Utah Utes men's basketball team =

American college basketball season

2013–14 Utah Utes men's basketball

NIT, First Round
- Conference: Pac-12 Conference
- Record: 21–12 (9–9 Pac–12)
- Head coach: Larry Krystkowiak (3rd season)
- Assistant coaches: Tommy Connor; DeMarlo Slocum; Andy Hill
- Home arena: Jon M. Huntsman Center

2013–14 Pac-12 Conference men's basketball standings
	Conf.				Overall
Team	W		L	PCT	W		L	PCT
No. 4 Arizona	15	–	3	.833	33	–	5	.868
No. 20 UCLA †	12	–	6	.667	28	–	9	.757
Oregon	10	–	8	.556	24	–	10	.706
Colorado	10	–	8	.556	23	–	12	.657
Arizona State	10	–	8	.556	21	–	12	.636
Stanford	10	–	8	.556	23	–	13	.639
California	10	–	8	.556	21	–	14	.600
Utah	9	–	9	.500	21	–	12	.636
Washington	9	–	9	.500	17	–	15	.531
Oregon State	8	–	10	.444	16	–	16	.500
Washington State	3	–	15	.167	10	–	21	.323
USC	2	–	16	.111	11	–	21	.344
† Conference tournament winner Rankings from AP poll

The 2013–14 Utah Runnin' Utes men's basketball team represented the University of Utah during the 2013–14 NCAA Division I men's basketball season. They played their home games at the Jon M. Huntsman Center in Salt Lake City, Utah and were a member of the Pac-12 Conference. The Utes were led by their third year head coach Larry Krystkowiak. Their last game was played in the first round of the NIT, where they lost to the Saint Mary's Gaels.

== Roster ==
#	Name	Position	Height	Weight (lbs.)	Class	Hometown	Last college or high school
1	Marko Kovacevic	F	6–11	235	Jr.	Belgrade, Serbia	Western Nebraska Community College
3	Princeton Onwas	G/F	6–5	210	Jr.	Katy, TX	Navarro College
5	Parker Van Dyke	G	6–3	170	Fr.	Salt Lake City, UT	East HS
10	Renan Lenz	F	6–9	221	Sr.	Santo Angelo, BRA	Arizona Western College
11	Brandon Taylor	G	5-10	162	So.	West Hollywood, CA	Pacific Hills HS
13	Ahmad Fields	G	6–5	190	Fr.	Washington, D.C.	Massanutten Military Academy
14	Dakarai Tucker	F/G	6–5	187	So.	Gardena, CA	Serra HS
21	Jordan Loveridge	F	6–6	230	So.	West Jordan, UT	West Jordan HS
25	Kenneth Ogbe	G	6–6	190	Fr.	Ehingen, GER	Urspring HS
31	Dallin Bachynski	C	7–0	248	Jr.	Calgary, AB	Southern Utah
40	Xan Ricketts	F	6–7	217	RS Jr.	Sandy, UT	Simon Fraser University
41	Jeremy Olsen	F	6–10	228	RS So.	Lawerence, GA	Collins Hills HS
55	Delon Wright	G	6–5	180	Jr.	Lawndale, CA	City College of San Francisco

== Schedule and results ==
All home games and conference road games will be televised on Fox Sports 1, ESPN Networks, or Pac-12 Networks. The game against Grand Canyon will not be televised by the Pac-12 due to an ongoing dispute over for-profit universities competing in Division I athletics. All games will be broadcast on the radio and streamed online by KALL 700 Sports.

Date time, TV	Rank^{#}	Opponent^{#}	Result	Record	Site (attendance) city, state
Exhibition
11/01/2013*; 7:30 pm		Saint Martin's	W 91–54	–	Jon M. Huntsman Center (7,191); Salt Lake City, UT
Non-conference regular season
11/08/2013*; 6:00 pm, P12N		Evergreen State	W 128–44	1–0	Jon M. Huntsman Center (7,768); Salt Lake City, UT
11/15/2013*; 8:00 pm, P12N		UC Davis	W 94–60	2–0	Jon M. Huntsman Center (10,685); Salt Lake City, UT
11/21/2013*; 6:00 pm		Grand Canyon; Global Sports Showcase	W 79–54	3–0	Jon M. Huntsman Center (6,286); Salt Lake City, UT
11/22/2013*; 7:00 pm, P12N		Lamar; Global Sports Showcase	W 84–57	4–0	Jon M. Huntsman Center (7,751); Salt Lake City, UT
11/23/2013*; 5:00 pm, P12N		Savannah State; Global Sports Showcase	W 71–57	5–0	Jon M. Huntsman Center (7,568); Salt Lake City, UT
11/27/2013*; 8:00 pm, P12N		Ball State	W 88–69	6–0	Jon M. Huntsman Center (8,761); Salt Lake City, UT
12/03/2013*; 8:05 pm, CBSSN		at Boise State	L 67–69	6–1	Taco Bell Arena (7,151); Boise, ID
12/07/2013*; 3:00 pm, P12N		Fresno State	W 90–77	7–1	Jon M. Huntsman Center (8,189); Salt Lake City, UT
12/10/2013*; 7:00 pm, P12N		Idaho State	W 74–66	8–1	Jon M. Huntsman Center (8,138); Salt Lake City, UT
12/14/2013*; 8:00 pm, P12N		BYU	W 81–64	9–1	Jon M. Huntsman Center (13,733); Salt Lake City, UT
12/19/2013*; 7:00 pm, P12N		Texas State	W 69–50	10–1	Jon M. Huntsman Center (7,857); Salt Lake City, UT
12/28/2013*; 2:00 pm, P12N		Saint Katherine	W 124–51	11–1	Jon M. Huntsman Center (9,954); Salt Lake City, UT
Pac-12 regular season
01/02/2014; 6:00 pm, P12N		No. 10 Oregon	L 68–70 ^{OT}	11–2 (0–1)	Jon M. Huntsman Center (13,426); Salt Lake City, UT
01/04/2014; 2:00 pm, P12N		Oregon State	W 80–69	12–2 (1–1)	Jon M. Huntsman Center (14,044); Salt Lake City, UT
01/08/2014; 9:00 pm, P12N		at Washington	L 57–59	12–3 (1–2)	Alaska Airlines Arena (3,424); Seattle, WA
01/12/2014; 5:00 pm, P12N		at Washington State	L 46–49	12–4 (1–3)	Beasley Coliseum (2,375); Pullman, WA
01/16/2014; 8:00 pm, P12N		USC	W 84–66	13–4 (2–3)	Jon M. Huntsman Center (9,231); Salt Lake City, UT
01/18/2014; 2:00 pm, FS1		No. 25 UCLA	W 74–69	14–4 (3–3)	Jon M. Huntsman Center (12,267); Salt Lake City, UT
01/23/2014; 7:00 pm, P12N		at Arizona State	L 75–79	14–5 (3–4)	Wells Fargo Arena (7,689); Tempe, AZ
01/26/2014; 6:00 pm, FS1		at No. 1 Arizona	L 56–65	14–6 (3–5)	McKale Center (14,545); Tucson, AZ
02/01/2014; 12:00 pm, P12N		at Colorado	L 75–79 ^{OT}	14–7 (3–6)	Coors Events Center (9,607); Boulder, CO
02/06/2014; 7:00 pm, P12N		Washington	W 78–69	15–7 (4–6)	Jon M. Huntsman Center (12,226); Salt Lake City, UT
02/08/2014; 4:00 pm, P12N		Washington State	W 81–63	16–7 (5–6)	Jon M. Huntsman Center (11,634); Salt Lake City, UT
02/13/2014; 8:30 pm, P12N		at USC	W 79–71	17–7 (6–6)	Galen Center (3,217); Los Angeles, CA
02/15/2014; 3:00 pm, P12N		at UCLA	L 66–80	17–8 (6–7)	Pauley Pavilion (9,577); Los Angeles, CA
02/19/2014; 8:00 pm, FS1		No. 4 Arizona	L 63–67 ^{OT}	17–9 (6–8)	Jon M. Huntsman Center (14,266); Salt Lake City, UT
02/23/2014; 6:00 pm, ESPNU		Arizona State	W 86–63	18–9 (7–8)	Jon M. Huntsman Center (10,401); Salt Lake City, UT
03/01/2014; 12:00 pm, P12N		Colorado	W 75–64	19–9 (8–8)	Jon M. Huntsman Center (12,027); Salt Lake City, UT
03/05/2014; 9:00 pm, ESPNU		at California	W 63–59	20–9 (9–8)	Haas Pavilion (8,267); Berkeley, CA
03/08/2014; 12:30 pm, P12N		at Stanford	L 60–61	20–10 (9–9)	Maples Pavilion (6,167); Palo Alto, CA
Pac-12 tournament
03/12/2014; 12:00 pm, P12N	No. (8)	vs. (9) Washington; First round	W 67–61	21–10	MGM Grand Garden Arena (N/A); Paradise, NV
03/13/2014; 1:00 pm, P12N	No. (8)	vs. No. 4 (1) Arizona; Quarterfinals	L 39–71	21–11	MGM Grand Garden Arena (N/A); Paradise, NV
NIT
03/18/2014*; 9:00 pm, ESPN2	No. (5)	at (4) Saint Mary's; First round	L 58–70	21–12	McKeon Pavilion (1,335); Moraga, CA
*Non-conference game. ^{#}Rankings from AP Poll, (#) is seed within tournament. (#) Tournament seedings in parentheses. All times are in Mountain Time.

== See also ==
- 2013–14 Utah Utes women's basketball team
