= Tre'Shaun Fletcher =

American basketball player

Personal information
- Born: October 5, 1994 (age 31) Wilmar, Arkansas, U.S.
- Listed height: 2.02 m (6 ft 8 in)
- Listed weight: 93 kg (205 lb)

Career information
- High school: Lincoln (Tacoma, Washington)
- College: Colorado (2013–2016); Toledo (2017–2018)
- NBA draft: 2018: undrafted
- Playing career: 2018–2022
- Position: Shooting guard / small forward

Career history
- 2018–2019: Salt Lake City Stars
- 2019–2020: Ura Basket
- 2020: Fortitudo Bologna
- 2020–2021: Pistoia
- 2021–2022: Limburg United

Career highlights
- Belgian Cup winner (2022); MAC Player of the Year (2018); First-team All-MAC (2018)

Tre'Shaun Javon Fletcher (born October 5, 1994) is an American former professional basketball player who last played for Limburg United of the Belgian BNXT League. He played college basketball for Toledo.

Fletcher was raised in Wilmar, Arkansas amidst poverty. He moved to Tacoma, Washington in eighth grade and attended Lincoln High School, where he became the all-time leading scorer. Fletcher committed to the University of Colorado, where he competed in 20 games as a freshman but sustained a knee injury that kept him sidelined until the Pac-12 tournament. As a sophomore, he averaged 5.4 points, 2.5 rebounds, and 1.0 assists per game. Fletcher increased those numbers to 7.1 points and 2.4 rebounds per game as a junior, starting 14. After the season, he opted to transfer to Toledo and sat out a year as a redshirt.

As a senior at Toledo, Fletcher posed averages of 18.7 points, 8.2 rebounds and 4.5 assists per game. He had a triple-double against Northern Illinois on February 27, 2018, by recording 20 points, 11 rebounds and a career-high 11 assists. At the conclusion of the regular season Fletcher was named MAC Player of the Year. He missed the MAC tournament championship game, a 76–66 loss to Buffalo, due to a left knee injury.

On December 30, 2019, Fletcher signed with Ura Basket of the Korisliiga. He averaged 18 points and 7.2 rebounds per game in 17 games. Fletcher signed with Fortitudo Bologna of the Lega Basket Serie A (LBA) on July 20, 2020.

On December 29 Fletcher was released from Fortitudo Bologna and moved to the Serie A2 Basket, second tier Italian league, signing for Pistoia Basket.

On September 13, 2021, Fletcher signed with Limburg United in the BNXT League.
