= Arizona State Sun Devils men's basketball statistical leaders =

The Arizona State Sun Devils men's basketball statistical leaders are individual statistical leaders of the Arizona State Sun Devils men's basketball program in various categories, including points, rebounds, assists, steals, and blocks. Within those areas, the lists identify single-game, single-season, and career leaders. As of the next college basketball season in 2024–25, the Sun Devils represent Arizona State University in the NCAA Division I Big 12 Conference.

Arizona State began competing in intercollegiate basketball in 1911. However, the school's record book does not generally list records from before the 1950s, as records from before this period are often incomplete and inconsistent. Since scoring was much lower in this era, and teams played much fewer games during a typical season, it is likely that few or no players from this era would appear on these lists anyway.

The NCAA did not officially record assists as a stat until the 1983–84 season, and blocks and steals until the 1985–86 season, but Arizona State's record books includes players in these stats before these seasons. These lists are updated through the 2024–25 season. Players active in 2025 are in bold.

== Scoring ==
Career
Rk	Player	Points	Seasons
1	Eddie House	2,044	1996–97 1997–98 1998–99 1999–00
2	Jeremy Veal	1,984	1994–95 1995–96 1996–97 1997–98
3	Ike Diogu	1,946	2002–03 2003–04 2004–05
4	Ron Riley	1,834	1992–93 1993–94 1994–95 1995–96
5	Tra Holder	1,797	2014–15 2015–16 2016–17 2017–18
6	Remy Martin	1,754	2017–18 2018–19 2019–20 2020–21
7	Stevin Smith	1,673	1990–91 1991–92 1992–93 1993–94
8	Jeff Pendergraph	1,588	2005–06 2006–07 2007–08 2008–09
9	Byron Scott	1,572	1979–80 1980–81 1981–82 1982–83
10	Steve Beck	1,549	1983–84 1984–85 1985–86 1986–87

Season
Rk	Player	Points	Season
1	Eddie House	736	1999–00
2	Ike Diogu	724	2004–05
3	Byron Scott	713	1982–83
4	James Harden	704	2008–09
5	Jeremy Veal	666	1997–98
6	Paul Williams	649	1982–83
7	Jahii Carson	647	2012–13
8	Mario Bennett	617	1994–95
9	Ike Diogu	615	2003–04
10	Torian Graham	614	2016–17
	Jahii Carson	614	2013–14

Single game
Rk	Player	Points	Season	Opponent
1	Eddie House	61	1999–00	California
2	Eddie House	46	1999–00	San Diego State
3	Paul Williams	45	1982–83	USC
4	Alonzo Verge Jr.	43	2019–20	Saint Mary's
5	Eddie House	42	1999–00	Penn State
6	Tra Holder	40	2017–18	Xavier
	Jahii Carson	40	2013–14	UNLV
	James Harden	40	2008–09	UTEP
	Eddie House	40	1999–00	UCLA
10	Ike Diogu	39	2004–05	Stanford
	Eddie House	39	1998–99	UNLV
	Stevin Smith	39	1993–94	Oregon St.

== Rebounds ==
Career
Rk	Player	Rebounds	Seasons
1	Tony Cerkvenik	1,022	1960–61 1961–62 1962–63
2	Jeff Pendergraph	942	2005–06 2006–07 2007–08 2008–09
3	Joe Caldwell	929	1961–62 1962–63 1963–64
4	Tony Zeno	836	1975–76 1976–77 1977–78 1978–79
5	Ike Diogu	802	2002–03 2003–04 2004–05
6	Al Nealey	780	1957–58 1958–59 1959–60
7	Alton Lister	776	1978–79 1979–80 1980–81
8	Art Becker	724	1961–62 1962–63 1963–64
9	Gerhard Schreur	700	1967–68 1968–69 1969–70
10	Mario Bennett	675	1991–92 1992–93 1993–94 1994–95

Season
Rk	Player	Rebounds	Season
1	Tony Cerkvenik	415	1960–61
2	Mark Landsberger	359	1976–77
3	Zylan Cheatham	351	2018–19
	Paul Stovall	351	1971–72
5	Joe Caldwell	330	1963–64
6	Obinna Oleka	327	2016–17
7	Art Becker	325	1962–63
8	Joe Caldwell	314	1962–63
9	Ike Diogu	312	2004–05
	Tony Cerkvenik	312	1961–62
	Jerry Hahn	312	1960–61

Single game
Rk	Player	Rebounds	Season	Opponent
1	Mark Landsberger	27	1976–77	San Diego St.
2	Tony Cerkvenik	26	1962–63	Arizona
	Art Becker	26	1962–63	BYU
4	Zylan Cheatham	22	2018–19	Arizona
	Art Becker	22	1962–63	Arizona
6	Paul Stovall	21	1971–72	Utah
	Gerhard Schreur	21	1969–70	Cal Poly-Pomona
	Joe Caldwell	21	1963–64	Colorado St.
	Joe Caldwell	21	1962–63	Whittier

== Assists ==
Career
Rk	Player	Assists	Seasons
1	Derek Glasser	551	2006–07 2007–08 2008–09 2009–10
2	Remy Martin	466	2017–18 2018–19 2019–20 2020-21
3	Bobby Thompson	454	1983–84 1984–85 1985–86 1986–87
4	Tra Holder	448	2014–15 2015–16 2016–17 2017–18
5	Lafayette Lever	444	1978–79 1979–80 1980–81 1981–82
6	Marcell Capers	437	1992–93 1993–94 1994–95
7	Stevin Smith	416	1990–91 1991–92 1992–93 1993–94
8	Jeremy Veal	413	1994–95 1995–96 1996–97 1997–98
9	Eddie House	405	1996–97 1997–98 1998–99 1999–00
10	Jason Braxton	384	2001–02 2002–03 2003–04 2004–05

Season
Rk	Player	Assists	Season
1	Ahlon Lewis	294	1997–98
2	Marcell Capers	233	1994–95
3	Marcell Capers	200	1992–93
4	Maurice Odum	187	2025–26
5	Mike Redhair	185	1989–90
6	Jahii Carson	177	2012–13
	Lynn Collins	177	1991–92
8	Derek Glasser	162	2008–09
9	Remy Martin	160	2018–19
10	Derek Glasser	158	2009–10

Single game
Rk	Player	Assists	Season	Opponent
1	Ahlon Lewis	16	1997–98	Northern Arizona
2	Ahlon Lewis	14	1997–98	USC
	Marcell Capers	14	1994–95	California
	Marcell Capers	14	1994–95	USC
	Lynn Collins	14	1990–91	Montana St.
6	Jahii Carson	13	2013–14	Texas Tech
	Ahlon Lewis	13	1997–98	Wagner
	Lafayette Lever	13	1980–81	Iowa
	Lynn Collins	13	1990–91	NAU

== Steals ==
Career
Rk	Player	Steals	Seasons
1	Eddie House	258	1996–97 1997–98 1998–99 1999–00
2	Stevin Smith	246	1990–91 1991–92 1992–93 1993–94
3	Lafayette Lever	236	1978–79 1979–80 1980–81 1981–82
4	Ron Riley	202	1992–93 1993–94 1994–95 1995–96
5	Jason Braxton	166	2001–02 2002–03 2003–04 2004–05
6	Jeremy Veal	158	1994–95 1995–96 1996–97 1997–98
7	Alton Mason	152	1998–99 1999–00 2000–01
8	Remy Martin	151	2017–18 2018–19 2019–20 2020–21
9	Byron Scott	150	1979–80 1980–81 1981–82 1982–83
10	Marcell Capers	141	1992–93 1993–94 1994–95

Season
Rk	Player	Steals	Season
1	Frankie Collins	84	2023–24
2	Lafayette Lever	76	1981–82
3	Eddie House	74	1999–00
	Lafayette Lever	74	1980–81
5	James Harden	73	2007–08
	Marcell Capers	73	1992–93
7	Stevin Smith	70	1993–94
	Stevin Smith	70	1992–93
9	Ron Riley	69	1994–95
10	Marcell Capers	66	1994–95

Single game
Rk	Player	Steals	Season	Opponent
1	Frankie Collins	8	2023–24	UMass Lowell
	Stevin Smith	8	1992–93	Alaska-Anchorage
	Stevin Smith	8	1991–92	UC Santa Barbara
	Lafayette Lever	8	1981–82	UC-Irvine
	Lafayette Lever	8	1980–81	Washington
6	James Harden	7	2007–08	USC
	Eddie House	7	1998–99	Kansas State
	Mike Redhair	7	1989–90	Seattle Pacific
	Alex Austin	7	1988–89	San Francisco
	Lafayette Lever	7	1981–82	Arizona

== Blocks ==
Career
Rk	Player	Blocks	Seasons
1	Jordan Bachynski	314	2010–11 2011–12 2012–13 2013–14
2	Mario Bennett	191	1991–92 1992–93 1993–94 1994–95
3	Tommy Smith	167	1999–00 2000–01 2001–02 2002–03
4	Rodger Farrington	160	1995–96 1996–97
5	Ike Diogu	153	2002–03 2003–04 2004–05
6	Alton Lister	148	1978–79 1979–80 1980–81
7	Jeff Pendergraph	131	2005–06 2006–07 2007–08 2008–09
8	Alonzo Gaffney	98	2021–22 2022–23 2023–24
9	Kurt Nimphius	93	1976–77 1977–78 1978–79 1979–80
10	Jalen Graham	90	2019–20 2020–21 2021–22

Season
Rk	Player	Blocks	Season
1	Jordan Bachynski	133	2013–14
2	Jordan Bachynski	120	2012–13
3	Mario Bennett	115	1994–95
4	Rodger Farrington	113	1996–97
5	Ike Diogu	75	2004–05
6	Tommy Smith	69	2002–03
	Massamba Diop	69	2025–26
8	Jayden Quaintance	63	2024–25
9	Warren Washington	60	2022–23
10	Jeff Pendergraph	56	2007–08

Single game
Rk	Player	Steals	Season	Opponent
1	Jordan Bachynski	12	2012–13	Cal-St.Northridge
2	Jordan Bachynski	9	2013–14	Oregon
	Jordan Bachynski	9	2012–13	C. Arkansas
	Jordan Bachynski	9	2012–13	Colorado
5	Jordan Bachynski	8	2013–14	Arizona
	Jordan Bachynski	8	2013–14	DePaul
	Jeff Pendergraph	8	2007–08	Southern Illinois
	Rodger Farrington	8	1996–97	Jacksonville
	Rodger Farrington	8	1996–97	Houston Baptist
	Rodger Farrington	8	1996–97	Oklahoma State
	Mario Bennett	8	1994–95	Old Dominion
	Alton Lister	8	1978–79	Harvard
