= 2013–14 Pac-12 Conference men's basketball season =

2013–14 Pac-12 men's basketball season
- League: NCAA Division I
- Sport: Basketball
- Teams: 12
- TV partner(s): ESPN, Fox Sports 1, CBS, Pac-12 Network

Regular Season
- Season champions: Arizona Wildcats
- Runners-up: UCLA Bruins
- Season MVP: Nick Johnson
- Top scorer: Nick Johnson, Arizona

Tournament
- Champions: UCLA Bruins
- Runners-up: Arizona
- Finals MVP: Kyle Anderson, UCLA

Basketball seasons
- ← 12–13 14–15 →

2013–14 Pac-12 Conference men's basketball standings
| | Conf. | | | | Overall |
| Team | W | | L | PCT | W | | L | PCT |
|---|---|---|---|---|---|---|---|---|
| No. 4 Arizona | 15 | – | 3 | .833 | 33 | – | 5 | .868 |
| No. 20 UCLA † | 12 | – | 6 | .667 | 28 | – | 9 | .757 |
| Oregon | 10 | – | 8 | .556 | 24 | – | 10 | .706 |
| Colorado | 10 | – | 8 | .556 | 23 | – | 12 | .657 |
| Arizona State | 10 | – | 8 | .556 | 21 | – | 12 | .636 |
| Stanford | 10 | – | 8 | .556 | 23 | – | 13 | .639 |
| California | 10 | – | 8 | .556 | 21 | – | 14 | .600 |
| Utah | 9 | – | 9 | .500 | 21 | – | 12 | .636 |
| Washington | 9 | – | 9 | .500 | 17 | – | 15 | .531 |
| Oregon State | 8 | – | 10 | .444 | 16 | – | 16 | .500 |
| Washington State | 3 | – | 15 | .167 | 10 | – | 21 | .323 |
| USC | 2 | – | 16 | .111 | 11 | – | 21 | .344 |
† Conference tournament winner Rankings from AP poll

The 2013–14 Pac-12 Conference men's basketball season begins with practices in October 2013 and ends with the 2014 Pac-12 Conference men's basketball tournament on March 15, 2014 at the MGM Grand Garden Arena in Paradise, Nevada. The regular season began on the first weekend of November 2013, with the conference schedule started in December 2013.

This is the third season under the Pac-12 Conference name and the 55th since the conference was established under its current charter as the Athletic Association of Western Universities in 1959. Including the history of the Pacific Coast Conference, which operated from 1915 to 1959 and is considered by the Pac-12 as a part of its own history, this is the Pac-12's 99th season of men's basketball.

== Pre-season ==
- October 17, 2013 – Pac-12 Men's Basketball Media Day, Pac-12 Networks Studios, San Francisco, Calif.

=== Men’s Basketball Media Poll ===
| Place | Team | Points | First place votes |
|---|---|---|---|
| 1 | Arizona | 273 | 21 |
| 2 | UCLA | 212 | 1 |
| 3 | Colorado | 211 | 1 |
| 4 | Oregon | 196 | |
| 5 | California | 194 | |
| 6 | Stanford | 166 | |
| 7 | Arizona State | 159 | |
| 8 | Washington | 121 | |
| 9 | Utah | 68 | |
| 10 | Oregon State | 67 | |
| 11 | USC | 63 | |
| 12 | Washington State | 39 | |

== Rankings ==
Legend
| | Improvement in ranking |
| | Drop in ranking |
| RV | Received votes but were not ranked in Top 25 of poll |

| | | Pre | Wk 2 | Wk 3 | Wk 4 | Wk 5 | Wk 6 | Wk 7 | Wk 8 | Wk 9 | Wk 10 | Wk 11 | Wk 12 | Wk 13 | Wk 14 | Wk 15 | Wk 16 | Wk 17 | Wk 18 | Wk 19 | Post | Final |
|---|---|---|---|---|---|---|---|---|---|---|---|---|---|---|---|---|---|---|---|---|---|---|
| Arizona | AP | 6 | 6 | 5 | 4 | 2 | 1 | 1 | 1 | 1 | 1 | 1 | 1 | 1 | 2 | 2 | 4 | 3 | 3 | 4 | 4 | - |
| Arizona | C | 5 | 5 | 4 | 3 | 2 | 1 | 1 | 1 | 1 | 1 | 1 | 1 | 1 | 3 | 3 | 4 | 3 | 3 | 4 | 5 | 5 |
| Arizona St | AP | RV | RV | RV | RV | NV | NV | NV | NV | NV | NV | NV | NV | NV | NV | NV | NV | NV | NV | NV | NV | - |
| Arizona St | C | RV | RV | RV | RV | NV | NV | NV | NV | NV | NV | NV | NV | NV | NV | NV | NV | NV | NV | NV | NV | NV |
| California | AP | NV | NV | NV | NV | NV | NV | NV | NV | NV | NV | RV | RV | NV | NV | NV | NV | NV | NV | NV | NV | - |
| California | C | RV | RV | RV | RV | NV | NV | NV | NV | NV | NV | RV | RV | NV | NV | NV | NV | NV | NV | NV | NV | NV |
| Colorado | AP | RV | RV | RV | RV | RV | 21 | 20 | 21 | 20 | 15 | 21 | RV | NV | NV | NV | NV | NV | NV | NV | NV | - |
| Colorado | C | RV | RV | RV | RV | RV | RV | 24 | 24 | 24 | 17 | 22 | RV | RV | NV | NV | NV | NV | NV | NV | NV | NV |
| Oregon | AP | 19 | 18 | 17 | 14 | 13 | 15 | 13 | 12 | 10 | 17 | RV | NV | NV | NV | NV | NV | NV | NV | NV | NV | - |
| Oregon | C | 18 | 18 | 17 | 15 | 13 | 11 | 11 | 10 | 9 | 13 | RV | RV | NV | NV | NV | NV | NV | NV | NV | NV | RV |
| Oregon St | AP | NV | NV | NV | NV | NV | NV | NV | NV | NV | NV | NV | NV | NV | NV | NV | NV | NV | NV | NV | NV | - |
| Oregon St | C | NV | NV | NV | NV | NV | NV | NV | NV | NV | NV | NV | NV | NV | NV | NV | NV | NV | NV | NV | NV | NV |
| Stanford | AP | RV | RV | NV | NV | NV | NV | NV | NV | NV | NV | NV | NV | NV | NV | NV | NV | NV | NV | NV | NV | - |
| Stanford | C | NV | NV | NV | NV | NV | NV | NV | NV | NV | NV | NV | NV | NV | NV | NV | NV | NV | NV | NV | NV | 24 |
| UCLA | AP | 22 | 24 | 22 | 19 | 18 | RV | RV | RV | RV | RV | 25 | RV | RV | NV | NV | NV | NV | NV | NV | 20 | - |
| UCLA | C | 23 | 24 | 24 | 21 | 17 | 23 | 22 | RV | RV | 25 | 25 | RV | RV | NV | NV | NV | NV | NV | NV | 23 | 15 |
| USC | AP | NV | NV | NV | NV | NV | NV | NV | NV | NV | NV | NV | NV | NV | NV | NV | NV | NV | NV | NV | NV | - |
| USC | C | NV | NV | NV | NV | NV | NV | NV | NV | NV | NV | NV | NV | NV | NV | NV | NV | NV | NV | NV | NV | NV |
| Utah | AP | NV | NV | NV | NV | NV | NV | NV | NV | NV | NV | NV | NV | NV | NV | NV | NV | NV | NV | NV | NV | - |
| Utah | C | NV | NV | NV | NV | NV | NV | NV | RV | NV | NV | NV | NV | NV | NV | NV | NV | NV | NV | NV | NV | NV |
| Washington | AP | RV | RV | NV | NV | NV | NV | NV | NV | NV | NV | NV | NV | NV | NV | NV | NV | NV | NV | NV | NV | - |
| Washington | C | NV | NV | NV | NV | NV | NV | NV | NV | NV | NV | NV | NV | NV | NV | NV | NV | NV | NV | NV | NV | NV |
| Washington St | AP | NV | NV | NV | NV | NV | NV | NV | NV | NV | NV | NV | NV | NV | NV | NV | NV | NV | NV | NV | NV | - |
| Washington St | C | NV | NV | NV | NV | NV | NV | NV | NV | NV | NV | NV | NV | NV | NV | NV | NV | NV | NV | NV | NV | NV |

== Conference Schedule ==
=== Composite Matrix ===
This table summarizes the head-to-head results between teams in conference play.

| | Arizona | Arizona St | California | Colorado | Oregon | Oregon St | Stanford | UCLA | USC | Utah | Washington | Washington St |
|---|---|---|---|---|---|---|---|---|---|---|---|---|
| vs. Arizona | – | 1–1 | 1–1 | 0–2 | 1–1 | 0–2 | 0–2 | 0–1 | 0–1 | 0–2 | 0–1 | 0–1 |
| vs. Arizona State | 1–1 | – | 0–2 | 1–1 | 1–1 | 1–1 | 1–1 | 1–0 | 0–1 | 1–1 | 1–0 | 0–1 |
| vs. California | 1–1 | 2–0 | – | 0–1 | 0–1 | 0–1 | 1–1 | 2–0 | 1–1 | 1–0 | 0–2 | 0–2 |
| vs. Colorado | 2–0 | 1–1 | 1–0 | – | 0–1 | 0–1 | 0–1 | 2–0 | 0–2 | 1–1 | 1–1 | 0–2 |
| vs. Oregon | 1–1 | 1–1 | 1–0 | 1–0 | – | 1–1 | 1–0 | 1–1 | 0–2 | 0–1 | 1–1 | 0–2 |
| vs. Oregon State | 2–0 | 1–1 | 1–0 | 1–0 | 1–1 | – | 0–1 | 1–1 | 0–2 | 1–0 | 2–0 | 0–2 |
| vs. Stanford | 2–0 | 1–1 | 1–1 | 1–0 | 0–1 | 1–0 | – | 1–1 | 0–2 | 0–1 | 0–1 | 0–2 |
| vs. UCLA | 1–0 | 0–1 | 0–2 | 0–2 | 1–1 | 1–1 | 1–1 | – | 0–2 | 1–1 | 0–1 | 1–0 |
| vs. USC | 1–0 | 1–0 | 1–1 | 2–0 | 2–0 | 2–0 | 2–0 | 2–0 | – | 2–0 | 1–0 | 0–1 |
| vs. Utah | 2–0 | 1–1 | 0–1 | 1–1 | 1–0 | 1–0 | 1–0 | 1–1 | 0–2 | – | 1–1 | 1–1 |
| vs. Washington | 1–0 | 0–1 | 2–0 | 1–1 | 1–1 | 0–2 | 1–1 | 1–0 | 0–1 | 1–1 | – | 1–1 |
| vs. Washington State | 1–0 | 1–0 | 2–0 | 2–0 | 2–0 | 2–0 | 2–0 | 0–1 | 1–0 | 1–1 | 1–1 | – |
| Total | 15–3 | 10–8 | 10–8 | 10–8 | 10–8 | 8–10 | 10–8 | 12–6 | 2–16 | 9–9 | 9–9 | 3–15 |

== Conference tournament ==
The conference tournament is scheduled for Wednesday–Saturday, March 12–15, 2014 at the MGM Grand Garden Arena, Paradise, Nevada. Arizona and UCLA were seeded one and two respectively. The top four teams had a bye on the first day, March 12. Teams were seeded by conference record, with ties broken by record between the tied teams followed by record against the regular-season champion, if necessary.

First round March 12
8 | Utah | 67
9 | Washington | 61
5 | Colorado | 59
12 | USC | 56
7 | Oregon | 88
10 | Oregon State | 74
6 | Stanford | 74
11 | Washington State | 63

Quarterfinals; March 13
1 | #4 Arizona | 71
8 | Utah | 39
4 | California | 56
5 | Colorado | 59
2 | UCLA | 82
7 | Oregon | 63
3 | Arizona State | 58
6 | Stanford | 79

Semifinals; March 14
1 | #4 Arizona | 63
5 | Colorado | 43
2 | UCLA | 84
6 | Stanford | 59

Championship; March 15
1 | #4 Arizona | 71
2 | UCLA | 75

== Head coaches ==
Sean Miller, Arizona
Herb Sendek, Arizona State
Mike Montgomery, California
Tad Boyle, Colorado
Dana Altman, Oregon
Craig Robinson, Oregon State
Johnny Dawkins, Stanford
Steve Alford, UCLA
Andy Enfield, USC
Larry Krystkowiak, Utah
Lorenzo Romar, Washington
Ken Bone, Washington State

== Postseason ==
=== NCAA tournament ===
| Seed | Region | School | Second round | Third round | Sweet 16 | Elite Eight | Final Four | Championship |
|---|---|---|---|---|---|---|---|---|
| 1 | West | Arizona | #16 Weber State - March 21, San Diego - W, 68–59 | #9 Gonzaga - March 23, San Diego - W, 84–61 | #4 San Diego State - March 27, Anaheim - W, 70–64 | #2 Wisconsin - March 29, Anaheim - L, 63–64 (OT) | | |
| 4 | South | UCLA | #13 Tulsa - March 21, San Diego - W, 76–59 | #12 Stephen F. Austin -March 23, San Diego - W, 77–60 | #1 Florida -March 27, Memphis - L 68–79 | | | |
| 7 | West | ORE | #10 BYU March 20, Milwaukee - W, 87–68 | #2 Wisconsin March 22, Milwaukee - L, 77–85 | | | | |
| 7 | Midwest | ASU | #10 Texas March 20, Milwaukee - L, 85–87 | | | | | |
| 8 | South | COLO | #9 Pittsburgh March 20, Orlando - L, 48–77 | | | | | |
| 10 | South | STAN | #7 New Mexico March 21, St. Louis - W, 58–53 | #2 Kansas March 23, St. Louis - W, 60–57 | #11 Dayton March 27, Memphis - L, 72–82 | | | |
| | 6 Bids | W-L (%): | 4–2 .667 | 3–1 .750 | 1–2 .333 | 0–1 .000 | 0–0 – | TOTAL: 8–6 .571 |

=== National Invitation tournament ===
| Seed | Bracket | School | First round | Second round | Quarterfinals | Semifinals | Finals |
|---|---|---|---|---|---|---|---|
| 2 | SMU | California | #7 Utah Valley - Mar. 19, Berkeley - W, 77–64 | #3 Arkansas - Mar. 24, Berkeley - W, 75-64 | #1 SMU - Mar. 26, Dallas- L, 65–67 | | |
| 5 | Minnesota | Utah | #4 Saint Mary's - Mar. 18, Moraga - L, 58–70 | | | | |
| | 2 Bids | W-L (%): | 1–1 .500 | 1–0 1.000 | 0–1 .000 | 0–0 – | TOTAL: 2–2 .500 |

=== College Basketball Invitational ===
| Seed | Bracket | School | First round | Second round | Quarterfinals | Semifinals | Finals |
|---|---|---|---|---|---|---|---|
| | | Oregon State | Radford - Mar. 19, Corvallis - L, 92–96 | | | | |
| | 1 Bid | W-L (%): | 0–1 .000 | 0–0 – | 0–0 – | 0–0 – | TOTAL: 0–1 .000 |

== Highlights and notes ==
- February 1, 2014 – Arizona's perfect season ended by California (58–60) at Haas Pavilion in Berkeley, CA.

== Awards and honors ==
- The Pac-12 Coach of the Year Award in both men’s and women’s basketball is now known as the John Wooden Coach of the Year Award.

=== Scholar-Athlete of the Year ===
- Dwight Powell, Sr., Stanford

=== Player-of-the-Week ===
- Nov. 11 – Tyrone Wallace, So., California
- Nov. 18 – Roberto Nelson, Sr., Oregon State
- Nov. 25 – Jahii Carson, So., Arizona State
- Dec. 2 – Nick Johnson, Jr., Arizona
- Dec. 9 – Askia Booker, Jr., Colorado
- Dec. 16 – Jordan Loveridge, So., Utah
- Dec. 23 – Chasson Randle, Jr., Stanford
- Dec. 30 – Roberto Nelson, Sr., Oregon State (2)
- Jan. 6 – Askia Booker, Jr., Colorado (2)
- Jan. 13 – Justin Cobbs, Sr., California
- Jan. 20 – Delon Wright, Jr., Utah
- Jan. 27 – Kyle Anderson, So. UCLA
- Feb. 3 – Justin Cobbs, Sr., California (2)
- Feb. 10 – Jordan Bachynski, Sr., Arizona State
- Feb. 17 – Jermaine Marshall, Sr., Arizona State
- Feb. 24 – Josh Huestis, Sr., Stanford
- Mar. 3 – Mike Moser, Sr., Oregon
- Mar. 10 – Mike Moser, Sr., Oregon (2)

=== All-Americans ===
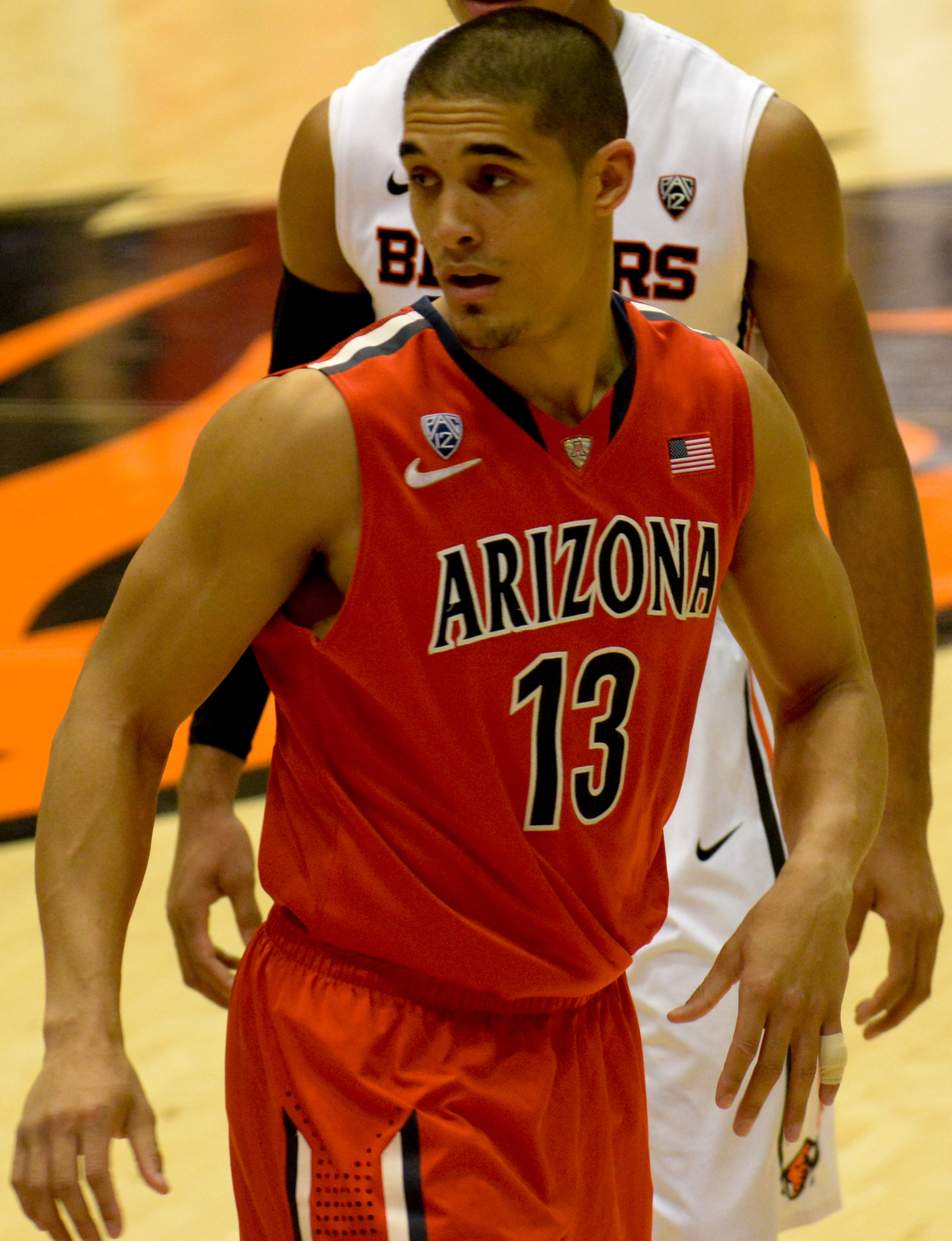
Nick Johnson

- Nick Johnson, Arizona, Consensus first team
- Kyle Anderson, UCLA, Third team (Associated Press, Sporting News)
- Aaron Gordon, Arizona, Third team (Sporting News)

=== All-Pac-12 teams ===
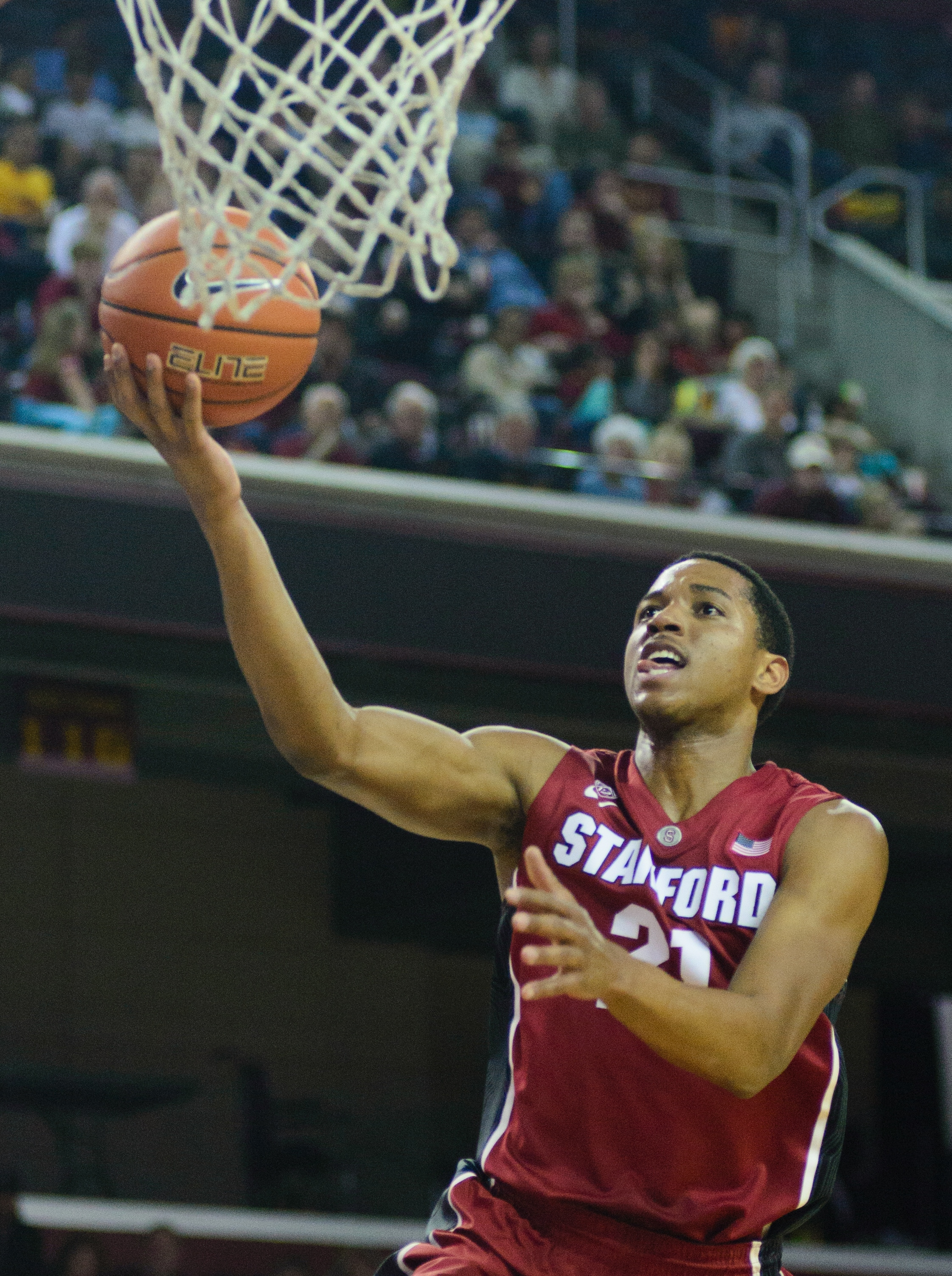
Anthony Brown

Voting was by conference coaches:

- Player of The Year: Nick Johnson, Arizona
- Freshman of The Year: Aaron Gordon, Arizona
- Defensive Player of The Year: Jordan Bachynski, Arizona State
- Most Improved Player of The Year: Anthony Brown, Stanford
- John R. Wooden Coach of the Year: Sean Miller, Arizona

==== First Team ====
| Name | School | Pos. | Yr. | Ht., Wt. | Hometown (Last School) |
|---|---|---|---|---|---|
| Jordan Adams | UCLA | G | So. | 6-5, 220 | Atlanta, Ga. (Oak Hill Academy) |
| Kyle Anderson | UCLA | G | So. | 6-9, 230 | Fairview, N.J. (St. Anthony HS) |
| Jahii Carson | ASU | G | So. | 5-11, 180 | Mesa, Ariz. (Mesa HS) |
| Justin Cobbs | CAL | G | Sr. | 6-2, 195 | Los Angeles, Calif. (Minnesota) |
| Aaron Gordon | ARIZ | F | Fr. | 6-8, 210 | San Jose, Calif. (Archbishop Mitty) |
| Nick Johnson | ARIZ | G | Jr. | 6-3, 200 | Gilbert, Ariz. (Findlay Prep) |
| Dwight Powell | STAN | F | Sr. | 6-10, 235 | Toronto, Ontario, Canada (IMG Academy) |
| Chasson Randle | STAN | G | Jr. | 6-1, 180 | Rock Island, Ill. (Rock Island HS) |
| Josh Scott | COLO | F | So. | 6-10, 245 | Monument, Colo. (Lewis-Palmer HS) |
| Delon Wright | UTAH | G | Jr. | 6-5, 180 | Lawndale, Calif. (City College of San Francisco) |

==== Pac-12 All-Freshman Team ====
| Name | School | Pos. | Ht., Wt. |
|---|---|---|---|
| Bryce Alford | UCLA | G | 6-3, 180 |
| Aaron Gordon | Arizona | F | 6-8, 210 |
| Rondae Hollis-Jefferson | Arizona | F | 6-7, 205 |
| Zach LaVine | UCLA | G | 6-5, 180 |
| Nigel Williams-Goss | Washington | G | 6-3, 185 |

==== Pac-12 All-Defensive Team ====
| Name | School | Pos. | Yr. | Ht., Wt. |
|---|---|---|---|---|
| Jordan Bachynski | Arizona State | C | Sr. | 7-2, 250 |
| Josh Huestis | Stanford | F | Sr. | 6-7, 230 |
| Nick Johnson | Arizona | G | Jr. | 6-3, 200 |
| T. J. McConnell | Arizona | G | Sr. | 6-1, 190 |
| Delon Wright | Utah | G | Jr. | 6-5, 180 |

=== All-Academic ===
First Team:

| Player, School | Year | GPA | Major |

Second Team:

=== USBWA All-District team ===
District VIII

| Name | School |
|---|---|
| Askia Booker | Colorado |
| Josh Scott | Colorado |
| Delon Wright | Utah |

District IX

- Player of The Year: Nick Johnson, Arizona
- Coach of The Year: Sean Miller, Arizona

| Name | School |
|---|---|
| Jordan Adams | UCLA |
| Kyle Anderson | UCLA |
| Jordan Bachynski | Arizona State |
| Jahii Carson | Arizona State |
| Aaron Gordon | Arizona |
| Nick Johnson | Arizona |
| C. J. Wilcox | Washington |
| Joseph Young | Oregon |

=== NABC All District Team ===
District 20 First Team

- Nick Johnson, Arizona
- Kyle Anderson, UCLA
- Justin Cobbs, CAL
- Jordan Adams, UCLA
- C. J. Wilcox, WASH

Second Team

- Dwight Powell, Stanford
- Jahii Carson, Arizona State
- Delon Wright, Utah
- Aaron Gordon, Arizona
- Chasson Randle, Stanford

=== NBA draft ===
| Round | Pick | Player | Position | Nationality | Team | School/club team |
|---|---|---|---|---|---|---|
| 1 | 4 | Aaron Gordon | PF | United States | Orlando Magic | Arizona (Fr.) |
| 1 | 13 | Zach LaVine | SG | United States | Minnesota Timberwolves | UCLA (Fr.) |
| 1 | 22 | Jordan Adams | SG | United States | Memphis Grizzlies | UCLA (So.) |
| 1 | 28 | C. J. Wilcox | SG | United States | Los Angeles Clippers | Washington (Sr.) |
| 1 | 29 | Josh Huestis | SF/PF | United States | Oklahoma City Thunder | Stanford (Sr.) |
| 1 | 30 | Kyle Anderson | SF | United States | San Antonio Spurs | UCLA (So.) |
| 2 | 38 | Spencer Dinwiddie | PG/SG | United States | Detroit Pistons | Colorado (Jr.) |
| 2 | 42 | Nick Johnson | PG | United States | Houston Rockets (from New York) | Arizona (Jr.) |
| 2 | 45 | Dwight Powell | PF | Canada | Charlotte Hornets | Stanford (Sr.) |
