= Pac-12 Conference Defensive Player of the Year =

Pac-12 Conference Defensive Player of the Year may refer to:

- Pac-12 Conference Football Defensive Player of the Year
- Pac-12 Conference Men's Basketball Defensive Player of the Year
