= Pac-12 Conference basketball =

Pac-12 Conference basketball may refer to:

- Pac-12 Conference men's basketball
- Pac-12 Conference women's basketball, the women's basketball program of the Pac-12 Conference
