= 2011–12 Pac-12 Conference men's basketball season =

2011–12 Pac-12 men's basketball season
- League: NCAA Division I
- Sport: Basketball
- Teams: 12

Regular Season
- Season champions: Washington Huskies
- Runners-up: California Golden Bears; Oregon Ducks
- Season MVP: Jorge Gutiérrez, California

Tournament
- Champions: Colorado Buffaloes
- Runners-up: Arizona Wildcats
- Finals MVP: Carlon Brown, Colorado

Basketball seasons
- ← 10–11 12–13 →

2011–12 Pac-12 Conference men's basketball standings
	Conf.				Overall
Team	W		L	PCT	W		L	PCT
Washington	14	–	4	.778	24	–	11	.686
California	13	–	5	.722	24	–	10	.706
Oregon	13	–	5	.722	24	–	10	.706
Arizona	12	–	6	.667	23	–	12	.657
Colorado †	11	–	7	.611	24	–	12	.667
UCLA	11	–	7	.611	19	–	14	.576
Stanford	10	–	8	.556	26	–	11	.703
Oregon State	7	–	11	.389	21	–	15	.583
Washington State	7	–	11	.389	19	–	18	.514
Arizona State	6	–	12	.333	10	–	21	.323
Utah	3	–	15	.167	6	–	25	.194
USC	1	–	17	.056	6	–	26	.188
† Conference tournament winner As of March 8, 2012; Rankings from AP poll

The 2011–12 Pac-12 Conference men's basketball season began with practices in October 2011 and ended with the 2012 Pac-12 Conference men's basketball tournament from March 7–10, 2012 at the Staples Center in Los Angeles. The regular season began on the weekend of November 5, with the conference schedule starting on December 29.

This was the first season under the Pac-12 Conference name. In July 2011, two schools joined the conference. Colorado arrived from the Big 12 and Utah entered from the Mountain West.

== Pre-season ==
- Pre-season media day was held on October 28, 2011 at L.A. Live's Nokia Theatre in downtown Los Angeles.
- 2011–12 Pac-12 Men's Basketball Media Poll:

Rank, School (first-place votes), Points
1. UCLA (14) 421
2. California (13) 405
3. Arizona (11) 404
4. Washington 355
5. Oregon 282
6. Stanford 255
7. USC 194
8. Oregon State 188
9. Arizona State 148
10. Colorado 119
11. Washington State 119
12. Utah 74

== Rankings ==
- Three conference teams were ranked in the pre-season poll: Arizona No. 16; UCLA No. 20; and Cal No. 24.

Legend
	Improvement in ranking
	Drop in ranking
RV	Received votes but were not ranked in Top 25 of poll

		Pre/ Wk 1	Wk 2	Wk 3	Wk 4	Wk 5	Wk 6	Wk 7	Wk 8	Wk 9	Wk 10	Wk 11	Wk 12	Wk 13	Wk 14	Wk 15	Wk 16	Wk 17	Wk 18	Wk 19	Final
Arizona	AP	16	15	23	RV	RV	RV	NV	NV	NV	NV	NV	NV	NV	NV	NV	NV	NV	NV	NV	
Arizona	C	16	16	23	RV	RV	NV	NV	NV	NV	NV	NV	NV	NV	NV	NV	NV	NV	NV	NV	NV
Arizona St	AP	NV	NV	NV	NV	NV	NV	NV	NV	NV	NV	NV	NV	NV	NV	NV	NV	NV	NV	NV	–
Arizona St	C	NV	NV	NV	NV	NV	NV	NV	NV	NV	NV	NV	NV	NV	NV	NV	NV	NV	NV	NV	NV
California	AP	24	23	20	24	RV	RV	RV	NV	RV	NV	NV	NV	NV	NV	NV	NV	NV	NV	NV	–
California	C	24	22	18	23	RV	RV	RV	NV	NV	NV	RV	NV	RV	NV	NV	NV	NV	NV	NV	NV
Colorado	AP	NV	NV	NV	NV	NV	NV	NV	NV	NV	NV	NV	NV	NV	NV	NV	NV	NV	NV	NV	–
Colorado	C	NV	NV	NV	NV	NV	NV	NV	NV	NV	NV	NV	NV	NV	NV	NV	NV	NV	NV	NV	NV
Oregon	AP	NV	NV	NV	NV	NV	NV	NV	NV	NV	NV	NV	NV	NV	NV	NV	NV	NV	NV	NV	–
Oregon	C	NV	NV	NV	NV	NV	NV	NV	NV	NV	NV	NV	NV	NV	NV	NV	NV	NV	NV	NV	NV
Oregon St	AP	NV	NV	RV	NV	RV	NV	NV	NV	NV	NV	NV	NV	NV	NV	NV	NV	NV	NV	NV	–
Oregon St	C	NV	NV	NV	NV	NV	NV	NV	NV	NV	NV	NV	NV	NV	NV	NV	NV	NV	NV	NV	NV
Stanford	AP	NV	NV	NV	RV	RV	RV	RV	RV	RV	RV	RV	NV	NV	NV	NV	NV	NV	NV	NV	–
Stanford	C	NV	NV	NV	RV	RV	RV	RV	RV	RV	RV	NV	NV	NV	NV	NV	NV	NV	NV	NV	NV
UCLA	AP	17	RV	NV	NV	NV	NV	NV	NV	NV	NV	NV	NV	NV	NV	NV	NV	NV	NV	NV	–
UCLA	C	20	RV	NV	NV	NV	NV	NV	NV	NV	NV	NV	NV	NV	NV	NV	NV	NV	NV	NV	NV
USC	AP	NV	NV	NV	NV	NV	NV	NV	NV	NV	NV	NV	NV	NV	NV	NV	NV	NV	NV	NV	–
USC	C	NV	NV	NV	NV	NV	NV	NV	NV	NV	NV	NV	NV	NV	NV	NV	NV	NV	NV	NV	NV
Utah	AP	NV	NV	NV	NV	NV	NV	NV	NV	NV	NV	NV	NV	NV	NV	NV	NV	NV	NV	NV	–
Utah	C	NV	NV	NV	NV	NV	NV	NV	NV	NV	NV	NV	NV	NV	NV	NV	NV	NV	NV	NV	NV
Washington	AP	RV	RV	RV	RV	NV	NV	NV	NV	NV	NV	NV	NV	NV	NV	NV	NV	NV	NV	NV	–
Washington	C	RV	RV	RV	RV	RV	NV	NV	NV	NV	NV	NV	NV	NV	NV	NV	NV	NV	NV	NV	NV
Washington St	AP	NV	NV	NV	NV	NV	NV	NV	NV	NV	NV	NV	NV	NV	NV	NV	NV	NV	NV	NV	–
Washington St	C	NV	NV	NV	NV	NV	NV	NV	NV	NV	NV	NV	NV	NV	NV	NV	NV	NV	NV	NV	NV

== Conference games ==
=== Composite Matrix ===
This table summarizes the head-to-head results between teams in conference play.

	Arizona	Arizona St	California	Colorado	Oregon	Oregon St	Stanford	UCLA	USC	Utah	Washington	Washington St
vs. Arizona	–	1–1	0–1	1–1	1–0	0–1	0–1	1–1	0–2	0–2	2–0	0–2
vs. Arizona St	1–1	–	1–0	2–0	1–0	0–1	1–0	2–0	0–2	1–1	2–0	1–1
vs. California	1–0	0–1	–	1–1	0–2	1–1	1–1	0–2	0–2	0–2	0–1	1–0
vs. Colorado	1–1	0–2	1–1	–	1–1	1–1	2–0	1–0	0–1	0–2	0–1	0–1
vs. Oregon	0–1	0–1	2–0	1–1	–	1–1	0–2	0–1	0–1	0–2	1–1	0–2
vs. Oregon St	1–0	1–0	1–1	1–1	1–1	–	2–0	0–1	0–1	0–2	2–0	2–0
vs. Stanford	1–0	0–1	1–1	0–2	2–0	0–2	–	1–1	0–2	1–1	1–0	1–0
vs. UCLA	1–1	0–2	2–0	0–1	1–0	1–0	1–1	–	0–2	0–1	1–1	0–2
vs. USC	2–0	2–0	2–0	1–0	1–0	1–0	2–0	2–0	–	0–1	2–0	2–0
vs. Utah	2–0	1–1	2–0	2–0	2–0	2–0	1–1	1–0	1–0	–	1–0	0–1
vs. Washington	0–2	0–2	1–0	1–0	1–1	0–2	0–1	1–1	0–2	0–1	–	0–2
vs. Washington St	2–0	1–1	0–1	1–0	2–0	0–2	0–1	2–0	0–2	1–0	2–0	–
Total	12–6	6–12	13–5	11–7	13–5	7–11	10–8	11–7	1–17	3–15	14–4	7–11

== Conference tournament ==
- March 7–10, 2012 – Pac-12 Conference Basketball Tournament, Staples Center, Los Angeles, California.

First round March 7, 2012
8	Washington State	64
9	Oregon State	69
5	UCLA	55
12	USC	40
7	Stanford	85
10	Arizona State	65
6	Colorado	53
11	Utah	41

Quarterfinals; March 8, 2012
1	Washington	84
9	Oregon State	86
4	Arizona	66
5	UCLA	58
2	California	77
7	Stanford	71
3	Oregon	62
6	Colorado	63

Semifinals; March 9, 2012
9	Oregon State	61
4	Arizona	72
2	California	59
6	Colorado	70

Championship Game; March 10, 2012
4	Arizona	51
6	Colorado	53

== Head coaches ==
Sean Miller, Arizona
Herb Sendek, Arizona State
Mike Montgomery, California
Tad Boyle, Colorado
Dana Altman, Oregon
Craig Robinson, Oregon State
Johnny Dawkins, Stanford
Ben Howland, UCLA
Kevin O'Neill, USC
Larry Krystkowiak, Utah
Lorenzo Romar, Washington
Ken Bone, Washington State

== Postseason ==
=== NCAA tournament ===
- March 14, 2012 – California defeated by South Florida 65–54
- March 15, 2012 - Colorado 68, UNLV 64
- March 17, 2012 - Baylor 80, Colorado 63

=== NIT ===
- March 13, 2012 – Washington def. UT-Arlington 82–72
- March 14, 2012 – Arizona defeated by Bucknell 65–54
- March 13, 2012 – Oregon def. LSU 96–74
- March 13, 2012 – Stanford def. Cleveland State 76–65

=== CBI ===
- March 13, 2012 – Washington State def. San Francisco 89–75
- March 14, 2012 – Oregon State def. Western Illinois 80-59
- March 19, 2012 – Oregon State def. TCU 101-81
- March 19, 2012 – Washington State def. Wyoming 61-41
- March 21, 2012 - Washington State def. Oregon State 72-55
- March 26, 2012 - Washington State def. Pittsburgh 67-66
- March 28, 2012 - Pittsburgh def. Washington State 57-53
- March 30, 2012 - Pittsburgh def. Washington State 71-65

== NBA draft ==
Round	Pick	Player	Position	Nationality	Team	School/club team
1	8	Terrence Ross	SG	United States	Toronto Raptors	Washington (So.)
1	24	Jared Cunningham	SG	United States	Cleveland Cavaliers (from L.A. Lakers, traded to Dallas)	Oregon State (Jr.)
1	25	Tony Wroten	PG	United States	Memphis Grizzlies	Washington (Fr.)

== Awards and honors ==
- The Pac-12 Coach of the Year Award in both men’s and women’s basketball is now known as the John Wooden Coach of the Year Award.

=== Player-of-the-Week ===
- Nov. 14 – C. J. Wilcox, Washington
- Nov. 28 – Maurice Jones, USC
- Dec. 12 – Brock Motum, Washington State
- Dec. 26 – Solomon Hill, Arizona
- Jan. 9 – Carlon Brown, Colorado
- Jan. 23 – Faisal Aden, Washington State
- Feb. 6 – Kyle Fogg, Arizona
- Feb. 20 – Justin Cobbs, California
- March 5 – Lazeric Jones, UCLA
- Nov. 21 – Jared Cunningham, Oregon State
- Dec. 5 – Solomon Hill, Arizona
- Dec. 19 – Ahmad Starks, Oregon State
- Jan. 2 – Tony Wroten, Washington
- Jan. 16 – Terrence Ross, Washington
- Jan. 30 – Jared Cunningham, Oregon State
- Feb. 13 – E. J. Singler, Oregon
- Feb. 27 – Kyle Fogg, Arizona

=== All-Pac-12 teams ===
Voting was by conference coaches:

- Player of The Year: Jorge Gutierrez, California
- Freshman of The Year: Tony Wroten, Washington
- Defensive Player of The Year: Jorge Gutierrez, California
- Most Improved Player of The Year: Brock Motum, Washington State
- John R. Wooden Coach of the Year: Lorenzo Romar, Washington

FIRST TEAM:

Name	School	Pos.	Year	Ht., Wt.	Hometown (Prev. School)
Allen Crabbe	CAL	G	So.	6-6, 205	Los Angeles, Calif. (Price HS)
Jared Cunningham	OSU	G	Jr.	6-4, 182	Oakland, Calif. (San Leandro HS)
Kyle Fogg	ARIZ	G	Sr.	6-3, 190	Brea, Calif. (Brea Olinda HS)
Jorge Gutierrez	CAL	G	Sr.	6-3, 195	Chihuahua, Mexico (Findlay College Prep, Nev.)
Solomon Hill	ARIZ	F	Jr.	6-6, 226	Los Angeles, Calif. (Fairfax HS)
Devoe Joseph	ORE	G	Sr.	6-4, 180	Pickering, Ont., Canada (Minnesota)
Brock Motum	WSU	F	Jr.	6-10, 230	Brisbane, Aus. (Australia Institute of Sport)
André Roberson	COLO	F	So.	6-7, 210	San Antonio, Texas (Wagner HS)
Terrence Ross	WASH	G	So.	6-6, 195	Portland, Ore. (Jefferson HS)
Tony Wroten	WASH	G	Fr.	6-4, 205	Seattle, Wash. (Garfield HS)

=== All-Academic ===
First Team:

Player, School	Year	GPA	Major

Second Team:

Player, School	Year	GPA	Major
