= Jahii Carson =

American professional basketball player (born 1993)

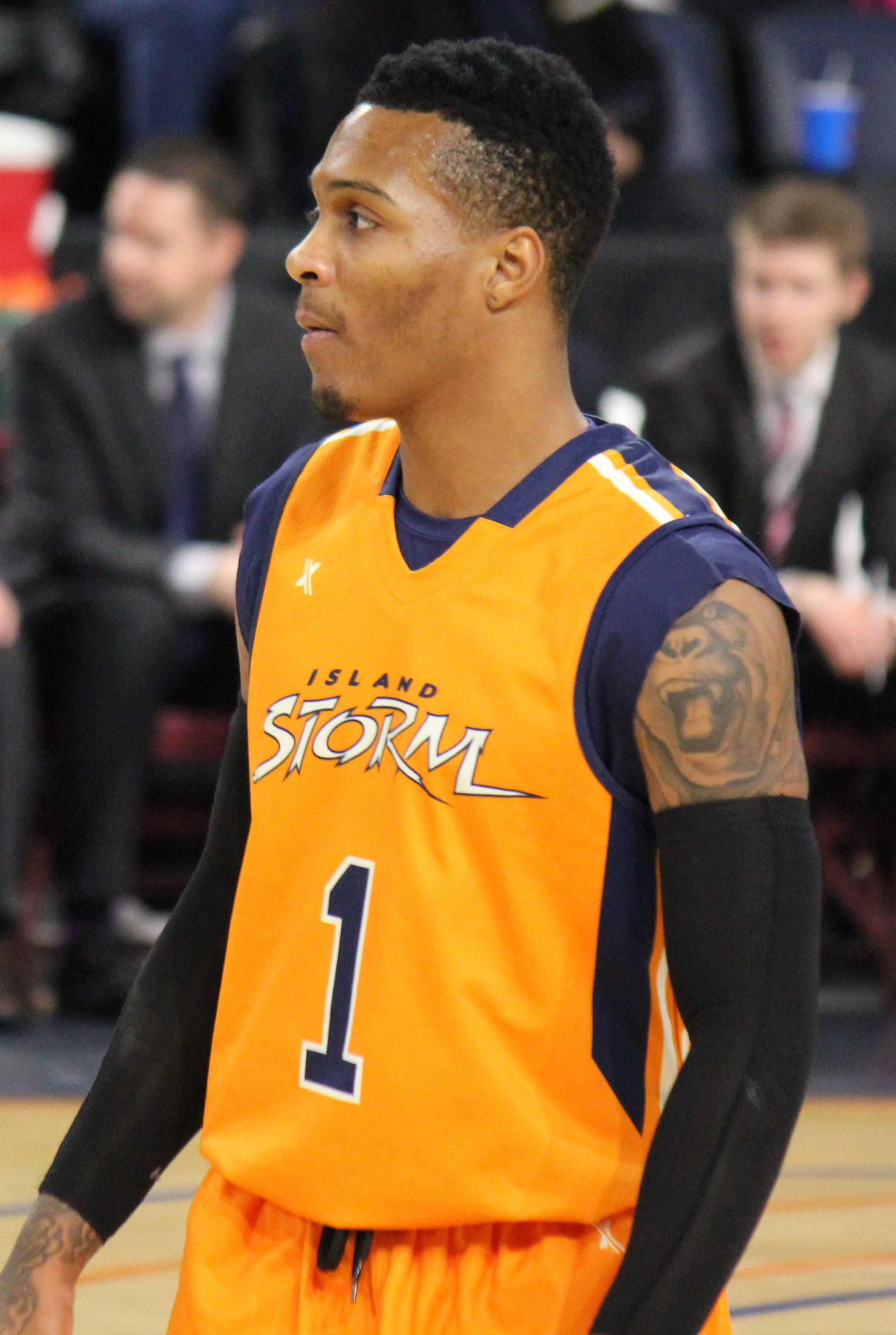
- Carson in 2017

ART Giants Düsseldorf
- Position: Point guard
- League: ProA

Personal information
- Born: August 31, 1993 (age 33) Phoenix, Arizona
- Listed height: 5 ft 11 in (1.80 m)
- Listed weight: 190 lb (86 kg)

Career information
- High school: Mountain Pointe (Phoenix, Arizona); Mesa (Mesa, Arizona)
- College: Arizona State (2012–2014)
- NBA draft: 2014: undrafted
- Playing career: 2014–present

Career history
- 2014–2015: Wollongong Hawks
- 2015: Metalac Valjevo
- 2016: Adanaspor
- 2016–2017: Island Storm
- 2017–2018: Koroivos
- 2018: Moncton Magic
- 2018–2019: BCM U Pitești
- 2019: APOEL
- 2020–2021: Academic Plovdiv
- 2021: Limburg United
- 2022: Rahoveci
- 2022: Vëllaznimi
- 2024–present: Giants Düsseldorf

Career highlights
- NBL Canada Newcomer of the Year (2017); 2× First-team All-Pac-12 (2013, 2014); Pac-12 co-Freshman of the Year (2013); Pac-12 All-Freshman Team (2013); Second-team Parade All-American (2011); Arizona Mr. Basketball (2011)

Jahii Carson (born August 31, 1993) is an American professional basketball player for SG ART Giants Düsseldorf of the ProA. He played college basketball for Arizona State University where he was co-freshman of the year in the Pac-12 Conference in 2013 and was considered one of the top returning college players for the 2013–14 season.

== High school career ==
Carson played high school basketball at Mesa High School in Mesa, Arizona. As a senior, he set the school records for points (32.2) and assists per game (6.6). At the close of the season, he was named a second-team Parade All-American.

== College career ==
Carson chose to play for coach Herb Sendek at Arizona State. However, he was declared academically ineligible for the 2011–12 season. As a redshirt freshman the following season, Carson averaged 18.5 points and 5.0 assists per game. He was named the Pac-12 co-Freshman of the Year with UCLA's Shabazz Muhammad and a first team All-Pac-12 selection. He was again named first team All-Pac-12 the following season.

On April 16, 2014, he declared for the NBA draft, forgoing his final two years of college eligibility.

== Professional career ==
At the NBA Pre-Draft Combine in May 2014, Carson recorded the equal-best maximum vertical leap from the 59 draft prospects, and historically his measured leaping ability ranked tied 8th all-time for NBA draft hopefuls.

After going undrafted in the 2014 NBA draft, Carson joined the Houston Rockets for the 2014 NBA Summer League where he went on to average 8.4 points and 1.6 assists. On August 21, 2014, he signed with the Wollongong Hawks for the 2014–15 NBL season. It was a dismal season for the Hawks as they finished last on the ladder with a 6–22 record. In 27 games, Carson averaged 14.5 points, 2.5 rebounds and 2.4 assists per game.

On February 28, 2015, Carson signed with Metalac Valjevo of Serbia for the rest of the season. On March 17, 2015, he was released by Metalac after appearing in just one game.

On February 19, 2016, Carson signed with Adanaspor of the Turkish Basketball First League.

On October 21, 2016 Carson signed with the Island Storm of the NBL Canada

On August 7, 2017, Carson signed with Koroivos of the Greek Basket League.

On August 3, 2018, Carson returned to the NBL Canada, signing with the Moncton Magic. Carson left the Magic after six games to join BCM U Pitești in Romania. He also had a brief stint with APOEL.

In May 2020, Carson signed with Úrvalsdeild karla club Þór Þorlákshöfn.

On June 19, 2021, he has signed with Limburg United of the BNXT League. In nine games, Carson averaged 7.6 points, 3.0 assists and 2.3 rebounds per game. He parted ways with the team on November 17.

== Personal ==
Carson is the son of Jonathan and Vanae Carson.
