= Frankie Collins =

American basketball player (born 2002)

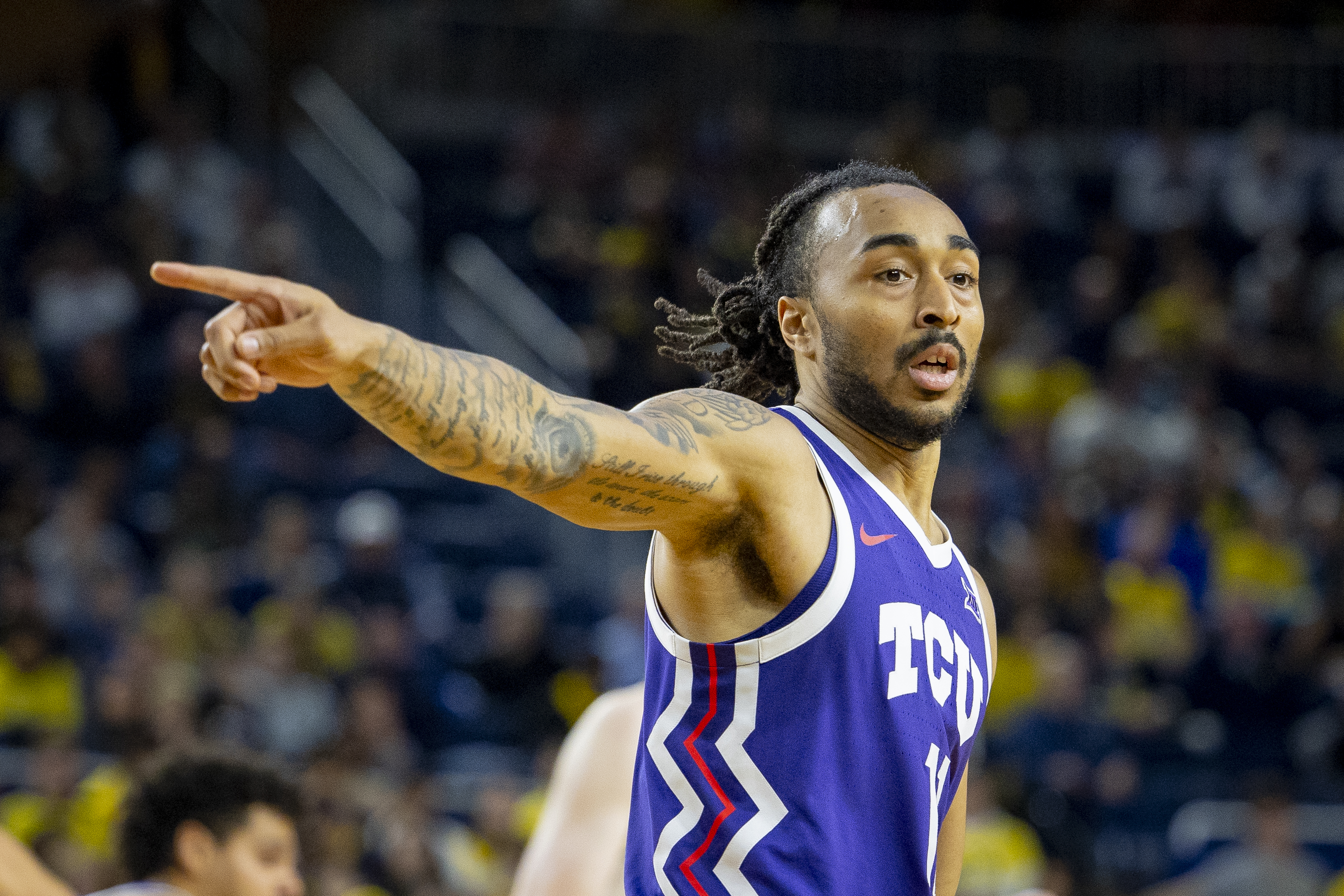
- Collins with the TCU Horned Frogs

No. 1 – EPG Koblenz
- Position: Point guard
- League: ProA

Personal information
- Born: January 23, 2002 (age 24) Sacramento, California, U.S.
- Listed height: 6 ft 1 in (1.85 m)
- Listed weight: 185 lb (84 kg)

Career information
- High school: Clark (Las Vegas, Nevada); Compass Prep (Chandler, Arizona); Coronado (Henderson, Nevada)
- College: Michigan (2021–2022); Arizona State (2022–2024); TCU (2024–2025); Vanderbilt (2025–2026)
- NBA draft: 2026: undrafted
- Playing career: 2026–present

Career history
- 2026–present: EPG Koblenz

Career highlights
- 2× Pac-12 All-Defensive Team (2023, 2024)

Frankie Collins (born January 23, 2002) is an American basketball player for EPG Koblenz of the German ProA. He played college basketball for the Michigan Wolverines, Arizona State Sun Devils, TCU Horned Frogs and Vanderbilt Commodores. As a junior, he led the Pac-12 Conference in steals, set the Arizona State single-season steals record (84) and tied the Arizona State single-game record (8).

== High school career ==
In his freshman year, Collins played basketball at Ed W. Clark High School in (Las Vegas, Nevada). In his junior year, he transferred to Compass Prep in Chandler, Arizona. In his senior year, he transferred to Coronado in Las Vegas.

=== Recruiting ===
On August 19, 2020, Collins announced his commitment to play at Michigan, over offers from Arizona, Arizona State, USC and others. He was part of Juwan Howard's first recruiting class that was the top-ranked class in the nation according to ESPN, Rivals.com and 247Sports for the 2021–22 Michigan Wolverines. The individual player rankings were Caleb Houstan at 8, Moussa Diabaté at 20, Collins at 59, Kobe Bufkin at 63, Isaiah Barnes at 114 and Will Tschetter at 155.

College recruiting
Name	Hometown	School	Height	Weight	Commit date
Frankie Collins; SG	Sacramento, CA	Coronado (NV)	6 ft 1 in (1.85 m)	185 lb (84 kg)	Aug 19, 2020
Frankie Collins; SG	Recruit ratings: Rivals: 247Sports: ESPN: (87)				
Overall recruit ranking: Rivals: 53 247Sports: 53 ESPN: 38
Note: In many cases, Scout, Rivals, 247Sports, On3, and ESPN may conflict in their listings of height and weight.; In these cases, the average was taken. ESPN grades are on a 100-point scale.; Sources: "Michigan 2021 Basketball Commitments". Rivals.; "2021 Michigan Wolverines Recruiting Class". ESPN.; "2021 Team Ranking". Rivals.

== College career ==
=== Michigan ===
In his freshman year, Collins came off the bench averaging 11 minutes per game. He averaged 2.8 points, 1.4 assists per game on 11 minutes. His first career start came in the Round 64 against Colorado State of the 2022 NCAA Tournament. He scored 14 points on 6–7 shooting. In the offseason, Collins announced that he's entering the transfer portal.

=== Arizona State ===
On May 4, 2022, Collins announced that he was transferring to Arizona State. In his sophomore year, Collins was the starting point guard. He averaged 9.9 points, 4.3 rebounds and 4.3 assists on 28.2 minutes. At the end of 2022–23 season, Collins announced that he declared for the 2023 NBA Draft. He eventually returned to the team a few weeks later. In his junior year, Collins set the school record for most steals in a season with 84 steals; beating Fat Lever's record of 76. His 2.6 steals per game lead the Pac-12 Conference and was 6th in the NCAA Division I. He also tied the school record for most steals in a game with 8 steals in a game against UMass Lowell. Collins ended his junior year making the Pac-12 All-Defensive team and earning a Pac-12 All-Conference Honorable Mention. After the season ended, Collins announced that he's entering the transfer portal.

=== TCU ===
On April 13, 2024, Collins announced that he was transferring to TCU.. After sustaining a foot injury in December, he did not play again for the Horned Frogs.

=== Vanderbilt ===
Collins played in nine games for the Commodores, averaging 7.8 points per game as the team's top bench guard. A knee injury suffered in December required a routine procedure, sidelining the guard from the court. Despite being medically cleared in January, Collins elected not to rejoin the team and withdrew from school in early March before the season had concluded. Head Coach Mark Byington stated on January 31st, "We invested in him, and he's a guy who can really help us win, so hopefully, he's got the same motivation to get back." On March 4th, Coach Byington shared that "Frankie has left Nashville, and he's not gonna be on the team. So we'll roll with the guys we got."

On March 27th, Collins officially entered the transfer portal for the fourth time.

== See also ==
- Arizona State Sun Devils men's basketball statistical leaders
