= Jorge Gutiérrez (basketball) =

Mexican basketball player (born 1988)

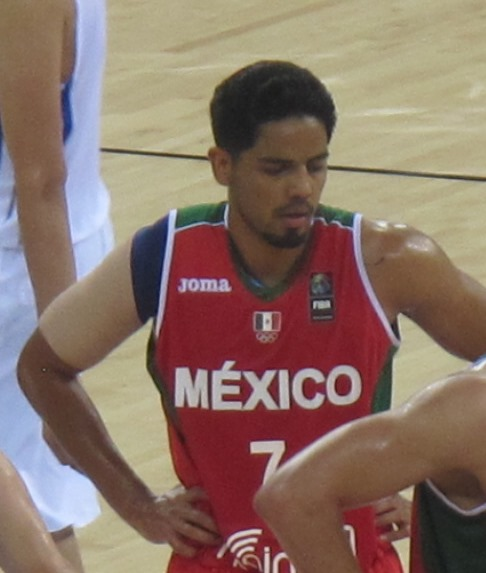
- Gutiérrez with Mexico in 2014

Long Island Nets
- Title: Assistant coach
- League: NBA G League

Personal information
- Born: December 27, 1988 (age 37) Chihuahua, Mexico
- Listed height: 6 ft 3 in (1.91 m)
- Listed weight: 195 lb (88 kg)

Career information
- High school: Lincoln (Denver, Colorado); Findlay Prep (Henderson, Nevada)
- College: California (2008–2012)
- NBA draft: 2012: undrafted
- Playing career: 2012–2024
- Position: Guard
- Number: 0, 7, 12, 13, 15, 17

Career history

Playing
- 2012: Pioneros de Quintana Roo
- 2012–2016: Canton Charge
- 2014: Brooklyn Nets
- 2015: Milwaukee Bucks
- 2016: Charlotte Hornets
- 2016–2017: Trabzonspor
- 2017–2018: Aquila Trento
- 2018: Gipuzkoa Basket
- 2018–2019: Capitanes de Ciudad de México
- 2019–2020: Hamburg Towers
- 2020–2021: BG Göttingen
- 2021: Peristeri
- 2021–2022: Astros de Jalisco
- 2022: Dorados Capital
- 2022–2023: Libertadores de Querétaro
- 2024: Apaches de Chihuahua

Coaching
- 2024–present: Long Island Nets (assistant)

Career highlights
- All-NBA D-League Second Team (2014); 2× NBA D-League All-Defensive First Team (2013, 2014); NBA D-League All-Rookie First Team (2013); LNBP Mexican MVP (2022); LBE Champion (2022); LBE Finals MVP (2022); AP Honorable mention All-American (2012); Pac-12 Player of the Year (2012); 2× First-team All-Pac-12 (2011, 2012); Pac-12 Defensive Player of the Year (2012); 3× Pac-12 All-Defensive Team (2010–2012)
- Stats at NBA.com
- Stats at Basketball Reference
Medals
Men's basketball
Representing Mexico
FIBA AmeriCup
Gold medal – first place	2013 Venezuela
Bronze medal – third place	2017 Argentina
Centrobasket
Gold medal – first place	2014 Mexico
Silver medal – second place	2016 Panama

Jorge Iván Gutiérrez Cárdenas (born December 27, 1988) is a Mexican former professional basketball player currently working as an assistant coach for the Long Island Nets of the NBA G League. He played college basketball for the California Golden Bears. He is considered one the best Mexican basketball players of all time.

== High school career ==
Gutiérrez attended Abraham Lincoln High School for two years, leading the Lancers to the Colorado state championship, earning tournament MVP honors after contributing 22.5 points and 6.0 rebounds on 58.8 percent field goal shooting over the course of the campaign. The next year, he averaged 20.3 points and 3.7 rebounds while shooting 61.4 percent from the floor. After two years, he moved to Findlay Prep where he averaged 13.4 points, 6.0 rebounds, 2.7 steals and 2.6 assists as a senior, earning the MVP award at the National Prep School Invitational in Rhode Island after helping his team to a runner-up finish.

== College career ==
Gutiérrez was recruited by coach Mike Montgomery to play at the University of California, Berkeley. In his senior year with the Golden Bears in 2011–12, Gutiérrez was named the 2012 Pac-12 Conference Player of the Year, as well as the conference's Defensive Player of the Year after averaging 13 points, 5.3 rebounds, 4.1 assists and 1.2 steals. He also earned All-Pac-12 honors in 2011 and 2012.

== Professional career ==
=== Pioneros de Quintana Roo (2012) ===
After going undrafted in the 2012 NBA draft, Gutiérrez joined the Denver Nuggets for the 2012 NBA Summer League. In August 2012, he tried out for Partizan of Serbia but was subsequently not signed. On October 3, 2012, he joined Pioneros de Quintana Roo of Mexico for the rest of the 2012 LNBP season. He played his tenth and final game for Pioneros on November 3, 2012, recording 9 points, 4 assists, 2 rebounds, 2 steals and 1 block.

=== Canton Charge (2012–2014) ===
On November 2, 2012, he was selected by the Canton Charge in the second round of the 2012 NBA D-League draft.

In July 2013, Gutiérrez joined the Sacramento Kings for the 2013 NBA Summer League. On September 30, 2013, he signed with the Brooklyn Nets. However, he was later waived by the Nets on October 26, 2013. In November 2013, he was re-acquired by the Canton Charge.

=== Brooklyn Nets (2014) ===
On March 6, 2014, he signed a 10-day contract with the Brooklyn Nets. On March 9, 2014, he made his NBA debut in a 104–89 win over the Sacramento Kings, making him the fourth Mexican to play in the NBA after Horacio Llamas, Eduardo Nájera, and Gustavo Ayón. In just under 5 minutes of playing time, he recorded 1 point and 1 steal. On March 17, 2014, he signed a second 10-day contract with the Nets. On March 21, 2014, he recorded an NBA career high 10 points, along with 3 rebounds, 1 assist and 1 block, in 114–98 victory over the Boston Celtics. On March 28, 2014, he signed a multi-year deal with the Nets.

In July 2014, Gutiérrez joined the Brooklyn Nets for the 2014 NBA Summer League.

On December 11, 2014, Gutiérrez was traded, along with Andrei Kirilenko, the Nets' second-round draft pick in 2020 and the right to swap second-round picks in 2018, to the Philadelphia 76ers in exchange for Brandon Davies. The next day, he was waived by the 76ers.

=== Canton Charge / Milwaukee Bucks (2014–2016) ===
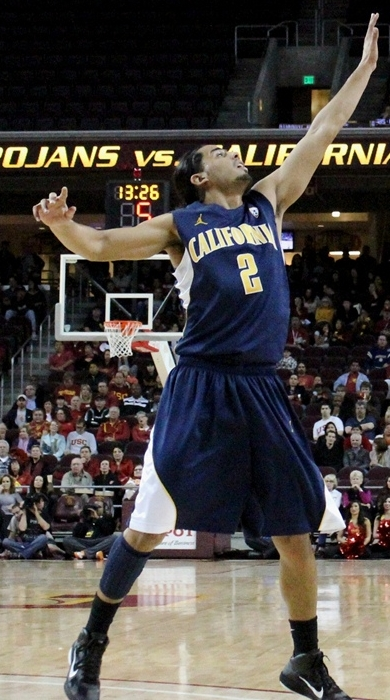
Jorge Gutiérrez playing with the California Golden Bears.

On December 23, 2014, Gutiérrez was reacquired by the Canton Charge. On January 28, 2015, Gutiérrez signed a 10-day contract with the Milwaukee Bucks, reuniting with his former Brooklyn Nets coach, Jason Kidd. On February 7, he signed a second 10-day contract with the Bucks. He parted ways with the Bucks on February 17 after the team did not sign him for the rest of the season. On March 4, he was reacquired by Canton. On April 7, he returned to the Bucks, signing a multi-year deal with the team. On October 21, 2015, he was waived by the Bucks.

On December 10, 2015, Gutiérrez was reacquired by the Canton Charge. The next day, he made his 2015–16 debut in a 110–107 win over the Iowa Energy, recording nine points, four rebounds, five assists and four steals in 29 minutes.

=== Charlotte Hornets (2016) ===
On February 20, 2016, Gutiérrez signed a 10-day contract with the Charlotte Hornets. Four days later, he made his debut for the Hornets in a 114–103 loss to the Cleveland Cavaliers, recording four points, two assists and one steal in four minutes off the bench. He went on to sign a second 10-day contract with the Hornets on March 1, and then a rest-of-season contract on March 11.

On September 26, 2016, Gutiérrez signed with the Brooklyn Nets, returning to the franchise for a second stint. However, he was later waived by the Nets on October 18 after appearing in three preseason games.

=== Trabzonspor (2016–2017) ===
On November 8, 2016, Gutiérrez signed a deal with Turkish club Trabzonspor.

On June 30, 2017, Gutierrez signed on to play for the Portland Trail Blazers NBA Summer League team.

=== Delteco GBC (2018–2019) ===
On August 28, 2018, Gutiérrez signed a one-year deal with Delteco GBC of the Liga ACB.

On January 29, 2019, the Basque club parted ways with Gutiérrez.

=== Hamburg Towers (2019–2020) ===
On November 4, 2019, Hamburg Towers announced that they had signed Gutiérrez. He averaged 14.2 points, 3.8 rebounds and 5.9 assists per game with Hamburg.

=== Göttingen (2020–2021) ===
On August 1, 2020, Gutiérrez signed with BG Göttingen of the Basketball Bundesliga.

=== Peristeri (2021) ===
On January 15, 2021, Gutiérrez signed with Peristeri of the Greek Basket League. Gutiérrez averaged 8.4 points, 2.4 rebounds, 2.4 assists, and 1.1 steals per game.

=== Astros de Jalisco (2021–2022) ===
On September 2, 2021, Gutiérrez signed with Astros de Jalisco of the Liga Nacional de Baloncesto Profesional (LNBP). He was named the Mexican MVP of the 2022 season.

=== Dorados Capital (2022) ===
On January 28, 2022, Gutiérrez signed with Dorados Capital of the Liga de Básquetbol Estatal de Chihuahua (LBE), helping the team win a title, while being named Finals MVP.

=== Libertadores de Querétaro (2022–2023) ===
On November 27, 2022, Gutiérrez signed with Libertadores de Querétaro of the Liga Nacional de Baloncesto Profesional.

=== Apaches de Chihuahua (2024) ===
On January 15, 2024, Gutiérrez signed with Apaches de Chihuahua of the Liga de Básquetbol Estatal de Chihuahua. On August 20, he announced his retirement from professional basketball.

== NBA career statistics ==
Legend
GP	Games played	GS	Games started	MPG	Minutes per game
FG%	Field goal percentage	3P%	3-point field goal percentage	FT%	Free throw percentage
RPG	Rebounds per game	APG	Assists per game	SPG	Steals per game
BPG	Blocks per game	PPG	Points per game	**Bold**	Career high

=== Regular season ===
Year	Team	GP	GS	MPG	FG%	3P%	FT%	RPG	APG	SPG	BPG	PPG
2013–14	Brooklyn	**15**	**2**	**16.3**	.463	**.250**	.750	1.5	**2.0**	**.7**	**.1**	**4.1**
2014–15	Brooklyn	10	0	4.4	.500	.000	.667	.7	.1	.1	.0	1.6
2014–15	Milwaukee	10	1	13.1	**.556**	.000	.700	**1.8**	1.5	.5	.0	3.7
2015–16	Charlotte	12	0	5.3	.545	.000	**.909**	.6	1.4	.3	.0	1.8
Career		47	3	10.3	.500	.176	.778	1.1	1.5	.4	.0	2.9

=== Playoffs ===
Year	Team	GP	GS	MPG	FG%	3P%	FT%	RPG	APG	SPG	BPG	PPG
2014	Brooklyn	2	0	1.5	–	–	**.500**	.5	.0	.0	.0	1.0
2015	Milwaukee	1	0	**12.0**	**.500**	–	–	**1.0**	**1.0**	.0	.0	**2.0**
2016	Charlotte	**3**	0	4.0	.000	–	–	.7	.7	.0	.0	.0
Career		6	0	4.5	.200	–	.500	.7	.5	.0	.0	.7

== National team career ==
In 2013, Gutiérrez made his debut for the Mexican national basketball team at the 2013 FIBA Americas Championship. He went on represent Mexico at the 2014 FIBA Basketball World Cup where he averaged 9.2 points per game.

== Coaching career ==
On September 12, 2024, Gutiérrez was hired by the Long Island Nets of the NBA G League to be an assistant coach.

== Personal life ==
The son of Fernando Gutiérrez and Bertha Cárdenas, he has two brothers, Fernando and Julián. He includes drawing among his hobbies and majored in interdisciplinary studies.
