= Pac-12 Conference Men's Basketball Most Improved Player of The Year =

Pac-12 Most Improved Player of The Year
- Awarded for: the most improved player in men's basketball in the Pac-12
- Country: United States
- Presented by: Pac-12 Conference
- First award: 2009; 17 years ago
- Currently held by: Maxime Raynaud, Stanford

The Pac-12 Most Improved Player of The Year is an annual college basketball award presented to the most improved player in men's basketball in the Pac-12 Conference. The winner was selected by conference coaches, who were not allowed to vote for players on their own team. The award began in 2009 when the conference consisted of 10 teams and was known as the Pacific-10. The conference added two teams and became the Pac-12 in 2011.

Justin Dentmon of Washington was the conference's first Most Improved Player of the Year in 2009. The most recent winner of the award is Maxime Raynaud of the Stanford Cardinal.

== Winners ==
| Season | Player | School | Class | Ref |
|---|---|---|---|---|
| 2008–09 | Justin Dentmon | Washington | Senior | |
| 2009–10 | Nikola Vucevic | USC | Sophomore | |
| 2010–11 | Matthew Bryan-Amaning | Washington | Senior | |
| 2011–12 | Brock Motum | Washington State | Junior | |
| 2012–13 | Dwight Powell | Stanford | Junior | |
| 2013–14 | Anthony Brown | Stanford | R–Junior | |
| 2014–15 | Josh Hawkinson | Washington State | Sophomore | |
| 2015–16 | George King | Colorado | Sophomore | |
| 2016–17 | Chimezie Metu | USC | Sophomore | |
| 2017–18 | Robert Franks | Washington State | Junior | |
| 2018–19 | Tyler Bey | Colorado | Sophomore | |
| 2019–20 | Chris Smith | UCLA | Junior | |
| 2020–21 | Jaiden Delaire | Stanford | Junior | |
| 2021–22 | Christian Koloko | Arizona | Junior | |
| 2022–23 | Oumar Ballo | Arizona | RS Junior | |
| 2023–24 | Maxime Raynaud | Stanford | Junior | |

== Winners by school ==
| School | Winners | Years |
|---|---|---|
| Stanford | 4 | 2013, 2014, 2021, 2024 |
| Washington State | 3 | 2012, 2015, 2018 |
| Arizona | 2 | 2022, 2023 |
| Colorado | 2 | 2016, 2020 |
| USC | 2 | 2010, 2017 |
| Washington | 2 | 2009, 2011 |
| UCLA | 1 | 2020 |
| Arizona State | 0 | — |
| California | 0 | — |
| Oregon | 0 | — |
| Oregon State | 0 | — |
| Utah | 0 | — |
