= Pac-12 Conference Men's Basketball Coach of the Year =

Annual college basketball award

Pac-12 Coach of the Year
- Awarded for: the top men's basketball coach in the Pac-12 Conference
- Country: United States

History
- First award: 1976
- Final award: Resuming in 2026–27

The John R. Wooden Coach of the Year, commonly known as the Pac-12 Coach of the Year, is an annual college basketball award presented to the top men's basketball coach in the Pac-12 Conference. The winner was selected by conference coaches, who were not allowed to vote for themselves. Former Arizona coach Lute Olson won the award a record seven times. It was first awarded in 1976, when the conference consisted of eight teams and was known as the Pacific-8, before becoming the Pacific-10 after expanding in 1978. Two more teams were added in 2011, when the conference became the Pac-12. The award was known as the Pac-10 Coach of the Year Award when it was renamed in John Wooden's honor following his death in June 2010. Wooden coached the UCLA Bruins for 27 years while winning a record 10 national championships, including seven straight. He retired in 1975, the year before the award began.

After 10 of the conference's 12 members left in 2024, the remaining members, Oregon State and Washington State, operated as a two-team conference while placing most of their sports, including basketball, in the West Coast Conference for two seasons. In 2025, the legacy members announced the addition of seven new full members effective in July 2026. Conference play is set to resume in the 2026–27 season.

Dick DiBiaso of Stanford and George Raveling of Washington State were co-winners in the award's inaugural year. Both schools finished in the lower half of the conference that year. DiBiaso is the only coach to have received the award with a losing record. He was a first-year coach for the Cardinal (then nicknamed Cardinals) with only one returning starter, and the team lost a number of significant players to injury. Stanford's record was 9–18 with 11 losses by six points or less. Since the conference expanded to 10 teams in 1978, the winner of the award has typically qualified for the NCAA Tournament. Marv Harshman was 19–10 with Washington in 1981–82 and fellow Huskies coach Bob Bender finished 16–12 in 1995–96 when the schools landed in the National Invitation Tournament (NIT). In 1990–91, Kelvin Sampson guided Washington State to a 16–12 record and did not compete in a postseason tournament.

== Key ==
†	Co-Coaches of the Year
Coach (X)	Denotes the number of times the coach has been awarded the Pac-12 Coach of the Year award at that point

== Winners ==
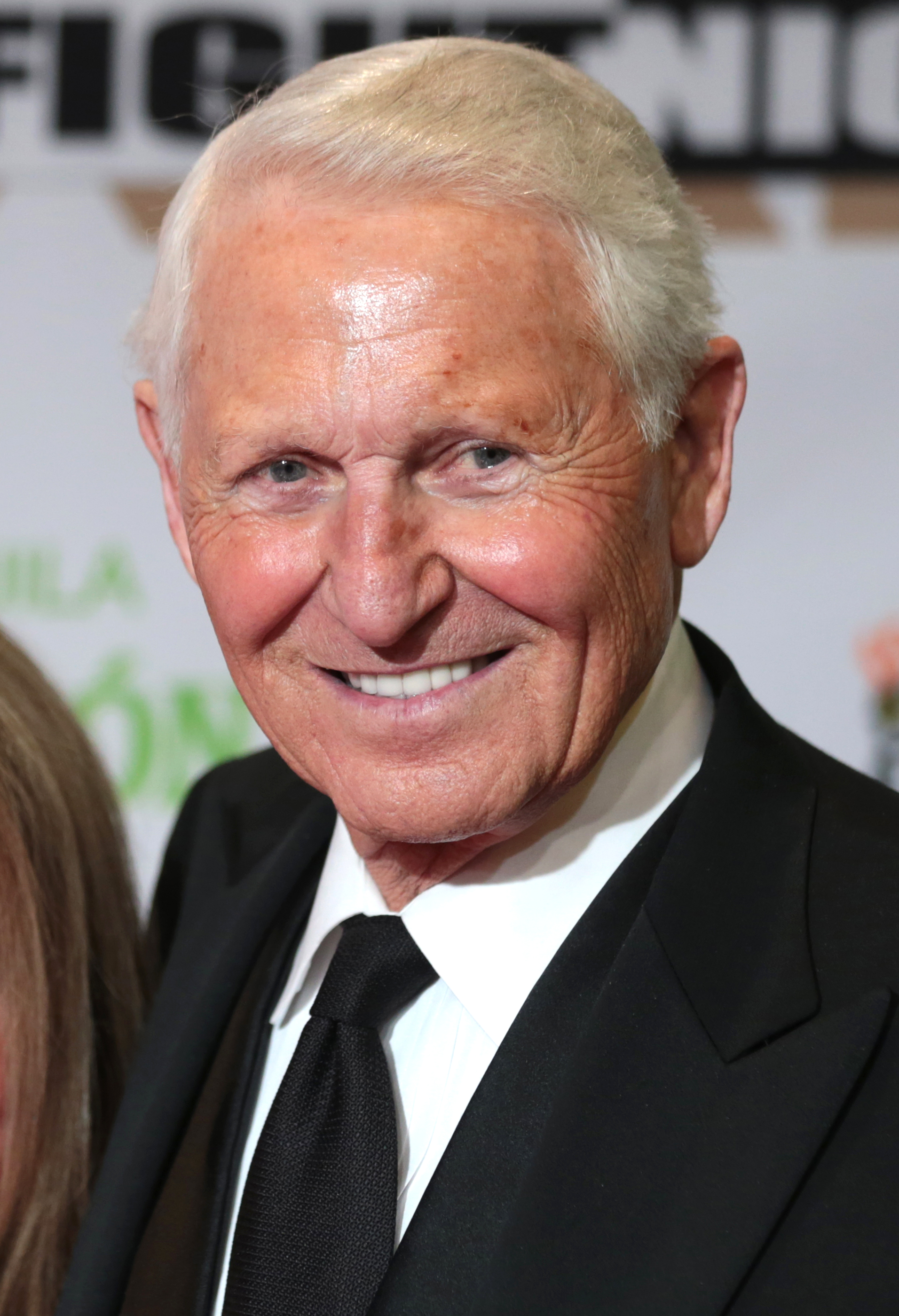
Lute Olson was named Coach of the Year a record seven times with Arizona

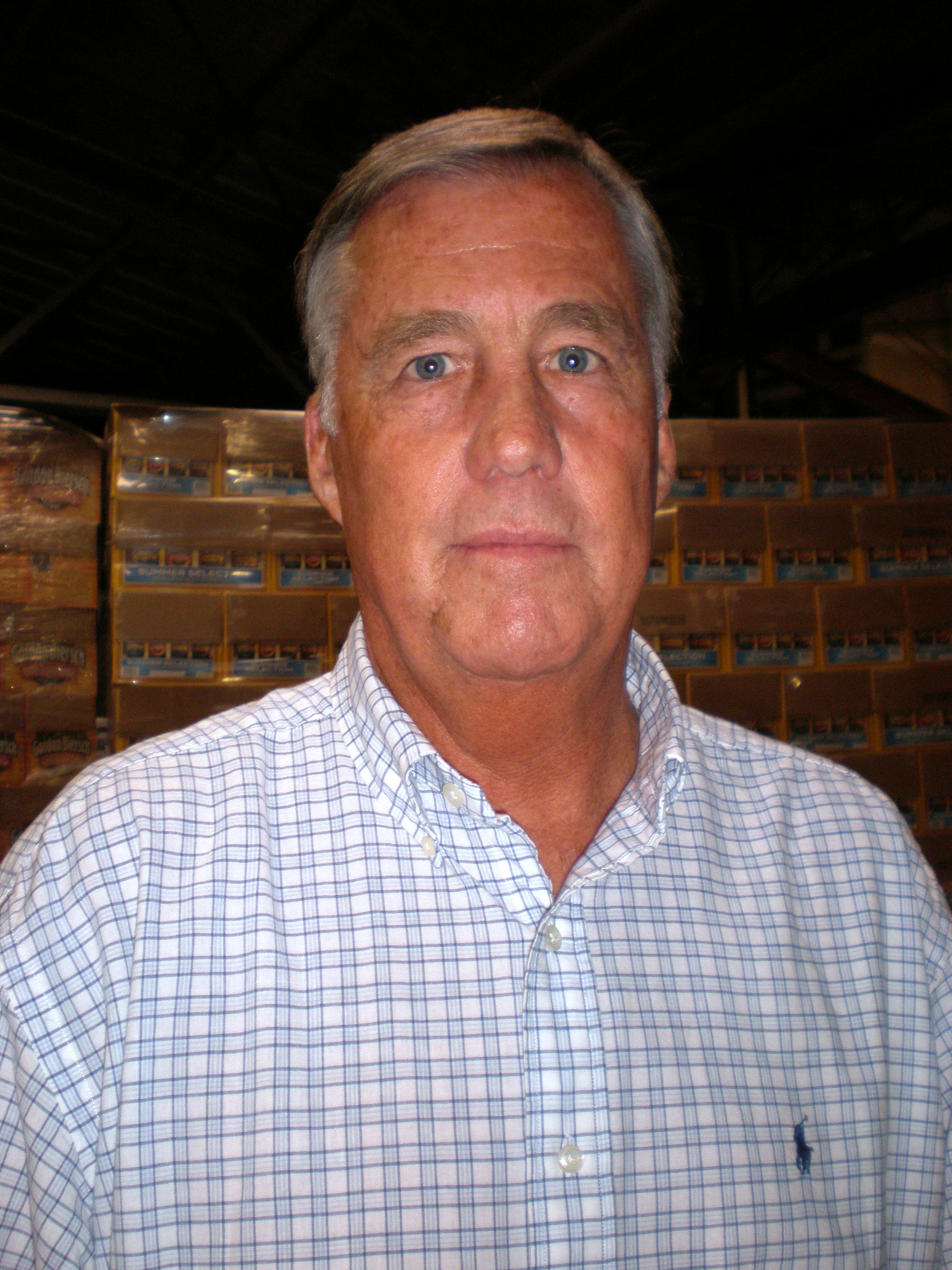
Mike Montgomery was a four-time winner at Stanford

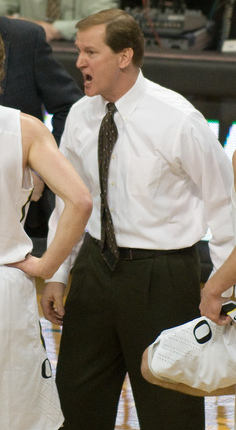
Oregon coach Dana Altman is a three-time honoree.

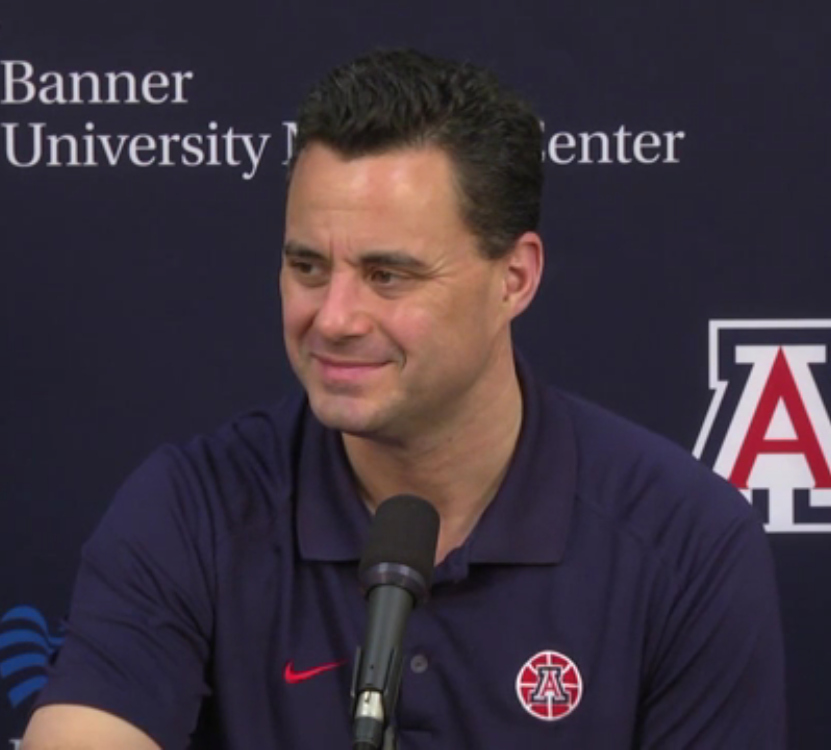
Sean Miller of Arizona has also won three times.

Season	Coach	School	Ref
1975–76^{†}	Dick DiBiaso	Stanford	
1975–76^{†}	George Raveling	Washington State	
1976–77	Dick Harter	Oregon	
1977–78	Gary Cunningham	UCLA	
1978–79	Bob Boyd	USC	
1979–80	Ned Wulk	Arizona State	
1980–81	Ralph Miller	Oregon State	
1981–82	Marv Harshman	Washington	
1982–83	George Raveling (2)	Washington State	
1983–84	Marv Harshman (2)	Washington	
1984–85	Stan Morrison	USC	
1985–86	Lute Olson	Arizona	
1986–87	Walt Hazzard	UCLA	
1987–88	Lute Olson (2)	Arizona	
1988–89^{†}	Lute Olson (3)	Arizona	
1988–89^{†}	Ralph Miller (2)	Oregon State	
1989–90	Jim Anderson	Oregon State	
1990–91	Kelvin Sampson	Washington State	
1991–92	George Raveling (3)	USC	
1992–93	Lute Olson (4)	Arizona	
1993–94	Lute Olson (5)	Arizona	
1994–95	Jim Harrick	UCLA	
1995–96	Bob Bender	Washington	
1996–97	Ben Braun	California	
1997–98	Lute Olson (6)	Arizona	
1998–99	Mike Montgomery	Stanford	
1999–2000	Mike Montgomery (2)	Stanford	
2000–01	Steve Lavin	UCLA	
2001–02	Ernie Kent	Oregon	
2002–03^{†}	Mike Montgomery (3)	Stanford	
2002–03^{†}	Lute Olson (7)	Arizona	
2003–04	Mike Montgomery (4)	Stanford	
2004–05	Lorenzo Romar	Washington	
2005–06	Ben Howland	UCLA	
2006–07	Tony Bennett	Washington State	
2007–08	Trent Johnson	Stanford	
2008–09	Lorenzo Romar (2)	Washington	
2009–10	Herb Sendek	Arizona State	
2010–11	Sean Miller	Arizona	
2011–12	Lorenzo Romar (3)	Washington	
2012–13	Dana Altman	Oregon	
2013–14	Sean Miller (2)	Arizona	
2014–15	Dana Altman (2)	Oregon	
2015–16	Dana Altman (3)	Oregon	
2016–17	Sean Miller (3)	Arizona	
2017–18	Mike Hopkins	Washington	
2018–19	Mike Hopkins (2)	Washington	
2019–20	Mick Cronin	UCLA	
2020–21	Andy Enfield	USC	
2021–22	Tommy Lloyd	Arizona	
2022–23	Mick Cronin (2)	UCLA	
2023–24	Kyle Smith	Washington State	
2024–25	Pac-12 basketball anticipated to resume in 2026–27		
2025–26	Pac-12 basketball anticipated to resume in 2026–27		
2026–27			

== Winners by school ==
Current conference members in bold.

School (years in conference)^{a}	Winners	Years
Arizona (1978–2024)	11	1986, 1988, 1989^{†}, 1993, 1994, 1998, 2003^{†}, 2011, 2014, 2017, 2022
Washington (1959–2024)	8	1982, 1984, 1996, 2005, 2009, 2012, 2018, 2019
UCLA (1959–2024)	7	1978, 1987, 1995, 2001, 2006, 2020, 2023
Stanford (1959–2024)	6	1976^{†}, 1999, 2000, 2003^{†}, 2004, 2008
Oregon (1964–2024)	5	1977, 2002, 2013, 2015, 2016
**Washington State** (1962–present)	5	1976^{†}, 1983, 1991, 2007, 2024
USC (1959–2024)	4	1979, 1985, 1992, 2021
**Oregon State** (1964–present)	3	1981, 1989^{†}, 1990
Arizona State (1978–2024)	2	1980, 2010
California (1959–2024)	1	1997
**Boise State** (2026–present)	0	—
Colorado (2011–2024)	0	—
**Colorado State** (2026–present)	0	—
**Fresno State** (2026–present)	0	—
**Gonzaga** (2026–present)	0	—
**San Diego State** (2026–present)	0	—
**Texas State** (2026–present)	0	—
Utah (2011–2024)	0	—
**Utah State** (2026–present)	0	—

- **^{a}** For purposes of this table, the "year joined" reflects the year that each team joined the conference now known as the Pac-12 as presently chartered. Although the Pac-12 claims the Pacific Coast Conference (PCC), founded in 1915, as part of its own history, that conference disbanded in 1959 due to infighting and scandal. That same year, four PCC members established the Athletic Association of Western Universities (AAWU) under a new charter that functions to this day, with a fifth joining before AAWU competition started. The coach of the year award was not established until 1976, by which time all of the final members of the PCC except for Idaho were reunited in what was then the Pac-8.

== See also ==
- Pac-12 Conference Women's Basketball Coach of the Year
