= Nick Johnson (basketball) =

American basketball player (born 1992)

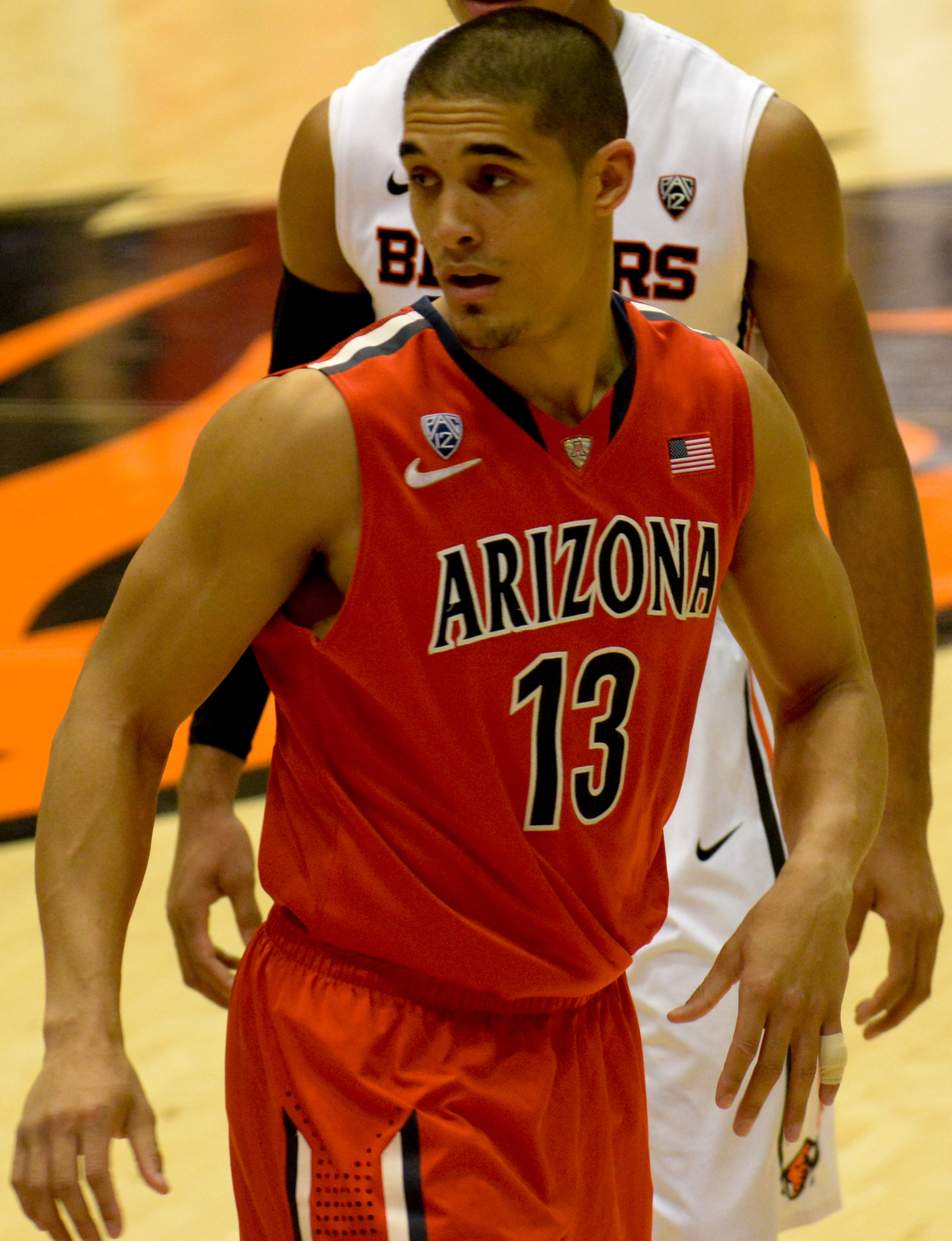
- Johnson with the Arizona Wildcats in 2014

No. 0 – Split
- Position: Point guard / shooting guard
- League: Premijer liga ABA League

Personal information
- Born: December 22, 1992 (age 33) Gilbert, Arizona, U.S.
- Listed height: 6 ft 3 in (1.91 m)
- Listed weight: 200 lb (91 kg)

Career information
- High school: Highland (Gilbert, Arizona); Findlay Prep (Henderson, Nevada)
- College: Arizona (2011–2014)
- NBA draft: 2014: 2nd round, 42nd overall pick
- Drafted by: Houston Rockets
- Playing career: 2014–present

Career history
- 2014–2015: Houston Rockets
- 2014–2015: →Rio Grande Valley Vipers
- 2015–2016: Austin Spurs
- 2016–2017: Bayern Munich
- 2017–2019: Austin Spurs
- 2019: Wisconsin Herd
- 2019: Nanterre 92
- 2019–2021: Türk Telekom
- 2021–2022: Nanterre 92
- 2022–2023: Beijing Ducks
- 2023: Hapoel Holon
- 2024: Cholet Basket
- 2024–2025: Trefl Sopot
- 2025–2026: Saint-Quentin
- 2026–present: Split

Career highlights
- NBA G League champion (2018); NBA G League Finals MVP (2018); Consensus first-team All-American (2014); Pac-12 Player of the Year (2014); First-team All-Pac-12 (2014); Pac-12 All-Defensive Team (2014); Pac-12 All-Freshman Team (2012)
- Stats at NBA.com
- Stats at Basketball Reference

Nicholas Alexander Johnson (born December 22, 1992) is an American professional basketball player for Split of the Premijer liga and the ABA League. He played college basketball for the Arizona Wildcats, with whom he was named the Pac-12 Player of the Year, and was then drafted 42nd overall by the Houston Rockets in the 2014 NBA draft.

== High school career ==
Johnson attended Highland High School in Gilbert, Arizona from 2007 to 2009, before transferring to Findlay Prep in Henderson, Nevada for his junior year. As a junior in 2009–10, he averaged 14.1 points, 4.6 rebounds and 3.4 assists per game as he led Findlay to a 32–2 record.

In November 2010, he signed a National Letter of Intent to play college basketball at the University of Arizona.

As a senior in 2010–11, he averaged 24.8 points, 6.5 rebounds and 4.7 assists per game as he led Findlay to a 28–4 record. He was ranked as the No. 40 overall prospect in the country and the No. 8 shooting guard by Rivals.com to go with a scout grade of 96 by ESPN.com. He went on to be named a Long Beach Press-Telegram Best in the West first-team selection.

== College career ==
In his freshman season at Arizona, Johnson was named to the 2012 Pac-12 All-Freshman team. In 35 games, he averaged 8.9 points, 3.3 rebounds and 2.4 assists in 28.1 minutes per game.

In his sophomore season, he earned honorable mention Pac-12 All-Defensive Team honors. At the Pac-12 Tournament in Las Vegas, he averaged a team-best 14.0 points to go with 4.0 assists and 2.0 rebounds per game. In 35 games, he averaged 11.5 points, 3.6 rebounds, 3.2 assists and 1.9 steals in 31.4 minutes per game.

In his junior season, he earned first-team All-Pac-12 and Pac-12 All-Defensive team honors, as well as being named the Pac-12 Player of the Year. He finished his career ranked 24th on UA's scoring list with 1,333 points. In 38 games, he averaged 16.3 points, 4.1 rebounds, 2.8 assists and 1.1 steals in 33.1 minutes per game.

On April 15, 2014, he declared for the NBA draft, foregoing his final year of college eligibility.

== Professional career ==
=== Houston Rockets (2014–2015) ===
On June 26, 2014, Johnson was selected with the 42nd overall pick in the 2014 NBA draft by the Houston Rockets. On July 25, 2014, he signed with the Rockets after averaging 12.5 points per game during the 2014 NBA Summer League. During his rookie season, he received multiple assignments to the Rio Grande Valley Vipers of the NBA Development League.

On July 20, 2015, the Rockets traded Johnson, Joey Dorsey, Kostas Papanikolaou, Pablo Prigioni, a 2016 first-round draft pick, and cash considerations to the Denver Nuggets in exchange for Ty Lawson and a 2017 second-round draft pick. On October 24, 2015, he was waived by the Nuggets after appearing in six preseason games.

=== Austin Spurs (2015–2016) ===
On December 28, 2015, Johnson was acquired by the Austin Spurs of the NBA Development League. In 34 games for Austin in 2015–16, he averaged 10.4 points, 3.7 rebounds, 3.0 assists and 1.0 steals per game.

On September 8, 2016, Johnson signed with the Orlando Magic, but was waived on October 22 after appearing in four preseason games.

=== Bayern Munich (2016–2017) ===
On October 29, 2016, Johnson signed with Bayern Munich of the German Basketball Bundesliga till the end of the season.

=== Second Stint with Austin Spurs (2017–2019) ===
On November 2, 2017, Johnson was included in the 2017–18 opening night roster for Austin Spurs. He helped the Austin Spurs win the G League championship and was named the G League Finals MVP.

He was signed by the San Antonio Spurs and played four preseason games before being waived. On November 18, 2018, he was reacquired by the Austin Spurs.

=== Wisconsin Herd (2019) ===
On January 16, 2019, Johnson was acquired by the Wisconsin Herd with returning right of Olivier Hanlan and a second-round pick in the 2019 NBA G League Draft for Travis Trice.

=== Nanterre 92 (2019) ===
On March 22, 2019, Johnson signed with Nanterre 92.

=== Türk Telekom (2019–2021) ===
On September 5, 2019, he signed with Türk Telekom of Turkish Super League. Johnson averaged 11.6 points, 3.7 rebounds and 4.3 assists per game. He re-signed with the team on October 27, 2020.

=== Second Stint with Nanterre 92 (2021–2022) ===
On July 30, 2021, he has signed with Nanterre 92 of the LNB Pro A.

=== Hapoel Holon (2023) ===
On November 6, 2023, he signed with Hapoel Holon of the Israeli Basketball Premier League.

=== Trefl Sopot (2024–2025) ===
On November 27, 2024, he signed with Trefl Sopot in the Polish Basketball League (PLK).

=== Saint-Quentin (2025–2026) ===
On July 25, 2025, he signed with Saint-Quentin of the LNB Pro A.

=== KK Split (2026–present) ===
On September 18, 2026, he signed with Split of the Premijer liga and the ABA League.

== NBA career statistics ==
Legend
GP	Games played	GS	Games started	MPG	Minutes per game
FG%	Field goal percentage	3P%	3-point field goal percentage	FT%	Free throw percentage
RPG	Rebounds per game	APG	Assists per game	SPG	Steals per game
BPG	Blocks per game	PPG	Points per game	**Bold**	Career high

=== Regular season ===
Year	Team	GP	GS	MPG	FG%	3P%	FT%	RPG	APG	SPG	BPG	PPG
2014–15	Houston	28	0	9.4	.347	.238	.680	1.4	.4	.3	.1	2.6
Career		28	0	9.4	.347	.238	.680	1.4	.4	.3	.1	2.6

=== Playoffs ===
Year	Team	GP	GS	MPG	FG%	3P%	FT%	RPG	APG	SPG	BPG	PPG
2015	Houston	9	0	5.4	.235	.143	1.000	.4	.4	.0	.1	1.3
Career		9	0	5.4	.235	.143	1.000	.4	.4	.0	.1	1.3

== Personal life ==
Johnson's father, Joey, and his uncle, Dennis, are both former professional basketball players with the latter being a three-time NBA champion and a member of the Naismith Memorial Basketball Hall of Fame.
