= Pac-12 Conference Men's Basketball Defensive Player of the Year =

Pac-12 Defensive Player of the Year
- Awarded for: the top defensive player in men's basketball in the Pac-12
- Country: United States
- Presented by: Pac-12 Conference
- First award: 1983
- Currently held by: Adem Bona, UCLA

The Pac-12 Defensive Player of the Year is an annual college basketball award presented to the top defensive player in men's basketball in the Pac-12 Conference. The winner was selected by conference coaches, who were not allowed to vote for players on their own team. The award began in 1984, when the conference consisted of 10 teams and was known as the Pacific-10. It stopped being issued starting in 1988 but was restarted in 2008. The conference added two teams and became the Pac-12 in 2011.

Jorge Gutiérrez of California (2012) and Evan Mobley of USC (2021) are the only players to also win the Pac-12 Player of the Year in the same season. Gary Payton won both awards in separate seasons with Oregon State, capturing the defensive honor as a freshman in 1987 and the conference player of the year as a senior in 1990. He credited Beavers coach Ralph Miller with molding him into a standout defender. Payton played 17 seasons in the National Basketball Association (NBA), and became the only point guard to be named the NBA Defensive Player of the Year. His son, Gary Payton II, later played with Oregon State as well, and was voted the Pac-12 Defensive Player of the Year in 2015 and 2016. He and Matisse Thybulle (2018, 2019) are the only repeat winners of the award.

== Winners ==
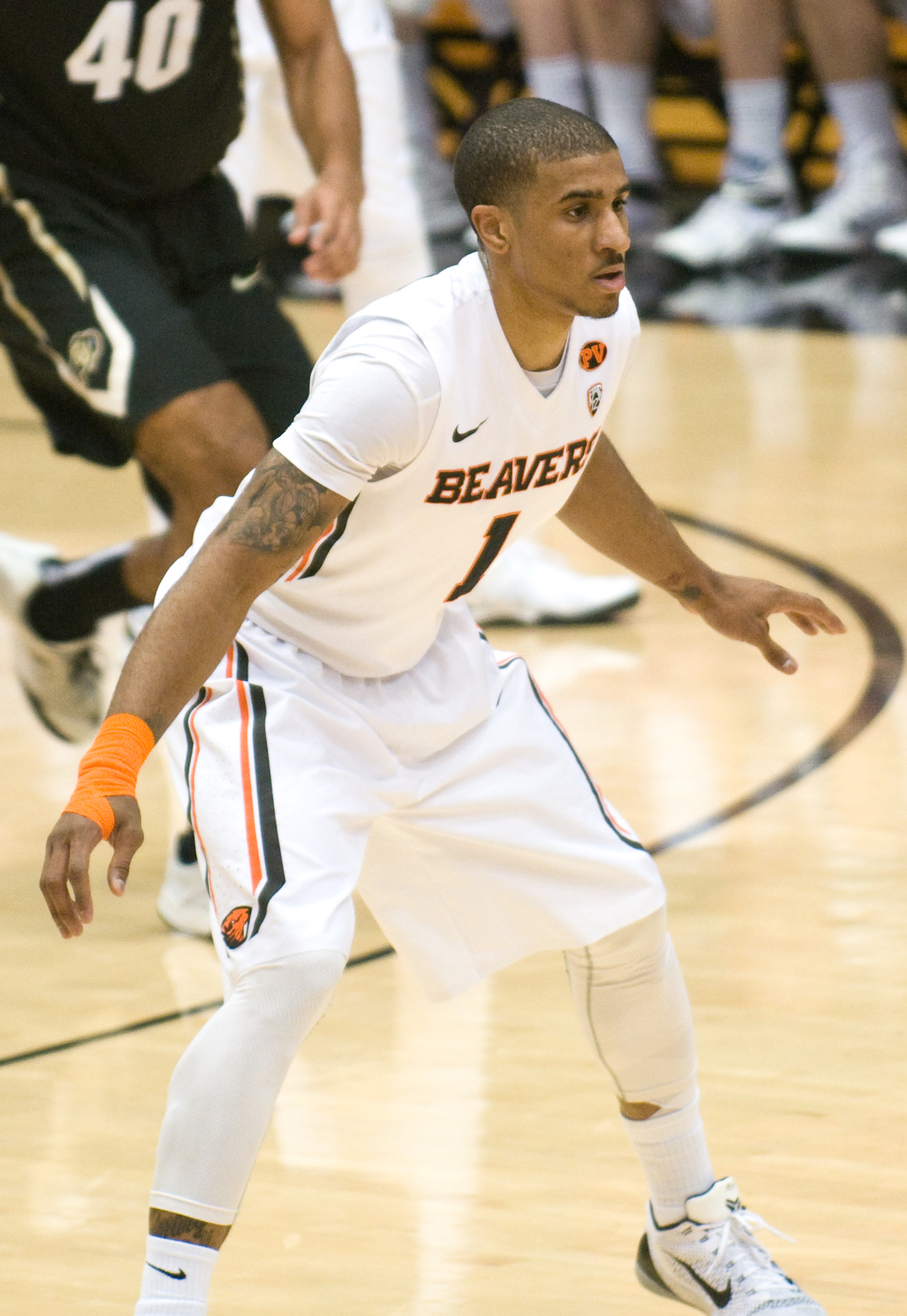
Gary Payton II won the award in 2015 and 2016.

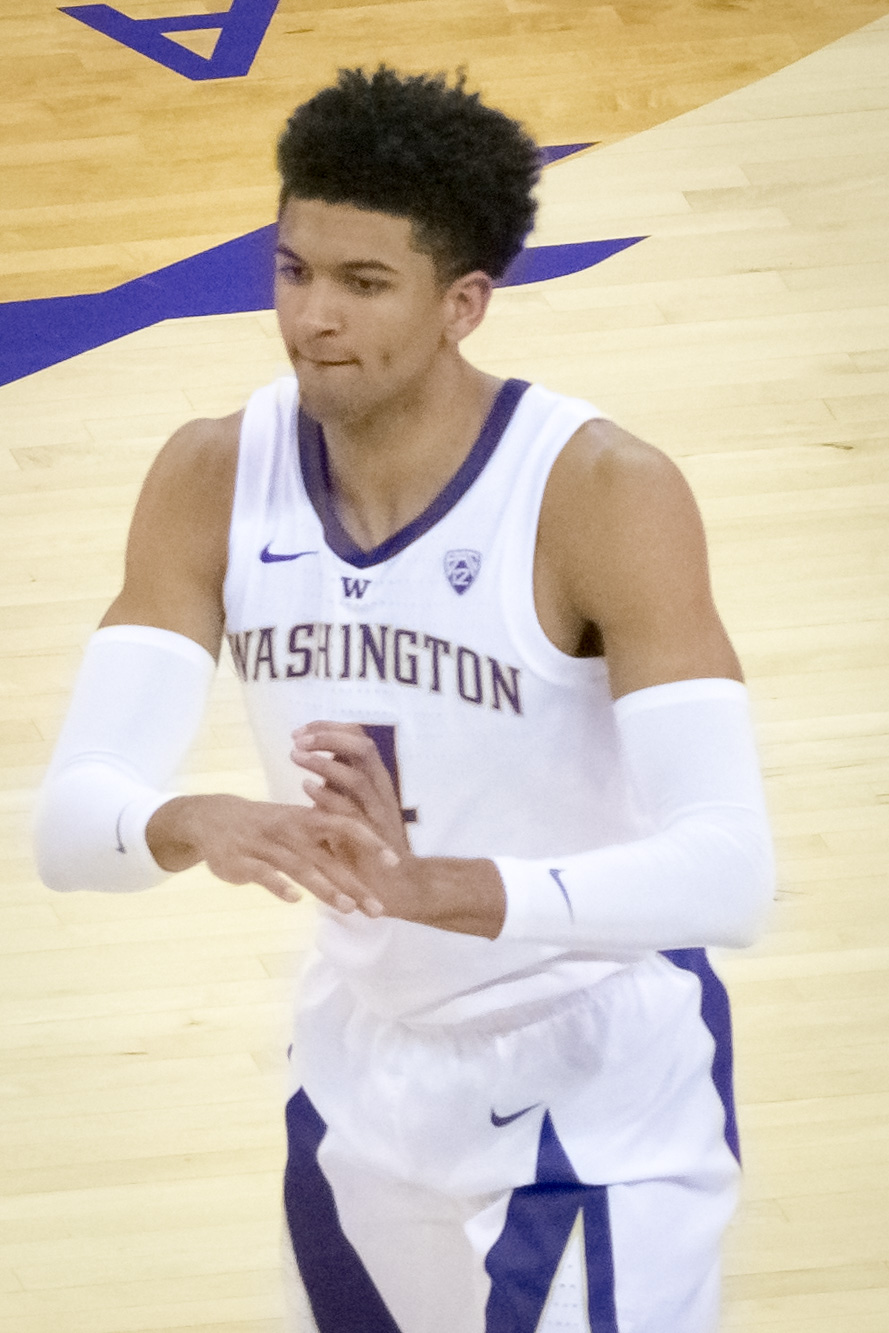
Matisse Thybulle won the award in 2018 and 2019.

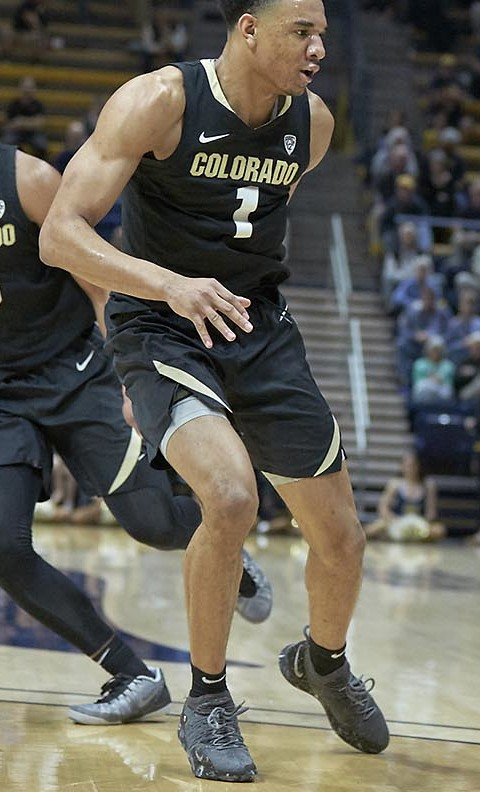
Tyler Bey won the award in 2020.

| Season | Player | School | Class | Ref |
|---|---|---|---|---|
| 1983–84 | Butch Hays | California | Senior | |
| 1984–85 | Nigel Miguel | UCLA | Senior | |
| 1985–86 | Keith Morrison | Washington State | Senior | |
| 1986–87 | Gary Payton | Oregon State | Freshman | |
| 2007–08 | Russell Westbrook | UCLA | Sophomore | |
| 2008–09 | Taj Gibson | USC | Junior | |
| 2009–10 | Seth Tarver | Oregon State | Senior | |
| 2010–11 | Marcus Simmons | USC | Senior | |
| 2011–12 | Jorge Gutiérrez | California | Senior | |
| 2012–13 | André Roberson | Colorado | Senior | |
| 2013–14 | Jordan Bachynski | Arizona State | Senior | |
| 2014–15 | Gary Payton II | Oregon State | Junior | |
| 2015–16 | Gary Payton II (2) | Oregon State | Senior | |
| 2016–17 | Jordan Bell | Oregon | Junior | |
| 2017–18 | Matisse Thybulle | Washington | Junior | |
| 2018–19 | Matisse Thybulle (2) | Washington | Senior | |
| 2019–20 | Tyler Bey | Colorado | Junior | |
| 2020–21 | Evan Mobley | USC | Freshman | |
| 2021–22 | Christian Koloko | Arizona | Sophomore | |
| 2022–23 | Jaylen Clark | UCLA | Junior | |
| 2023–24 | Adem Bona | UCLA | Sophomore | |

== Winners by school ==
| School | Winners | Years |
|---|---|---|
| Oregon State | 4 | 1987, 2010, 2015, 2016 |
| UCLA | 4 | 1985, 2008, 2023, 2024 |
| USC | 3 | 2009, 2011, 2021 |
| California | 2 | 1984, 2012 |
| Colorado | 2 | 2013, 2020 |
| Washington | 2 | 2018, 2019 |
| Arizona | 1 | 2022 |
| Arizona State | 1 | 2014 |
| Oregon | 1 | 2017 |
| Washington State | 1 | 1986 |
| Stanford | 0 | — |
| Utah | 0 | — |
