= Jordan Bachynski =

Canadian basketball player

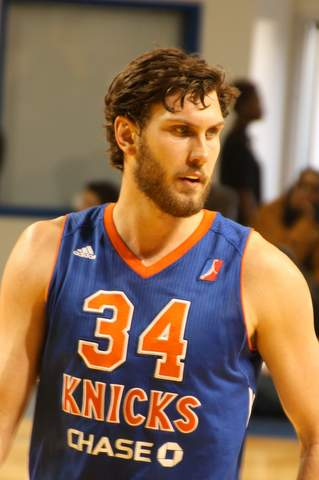
- Bachynski with Westchester in 2016

Personal information
- Born: September 6, 1989 (age 37) Calgary, Alberta, Canada
- Listed height: 7 ft 2 in (2.18 m)
- Listed weight: 254 lb (115 kg)

Career information
- High school: Centennial (Calgary, Alberta)
- College: Arizona State (2010–2014)
- NBA draft: 2014: undrafted
- Playing career: 2014–2018
- Position: Center

Career history
- 2014: Eskişehir Basket
- 2015–2016: Westchester Knicks
- 2016–2017: Nagoya Diamond Dolphins
- 2017: Levanga Hokkaido
- 2017–2018: Obradoiro CAB

Career highlights
- All-NBA D-League Third Team (2016); NBA D-League All-Defensive Team (2016); NBA D-League All-Star (2016); Second-team All-Pac-12 (2014); Pac-12 Defensive Player of the Year (2014); Pac-12 All-Defensive Team (2014); NCAA blocks leader (2014)
- Stats at Basketball Reference

Jordan Anthony Peter Bachynski (born September 6, 1989) is a Canadian former professional basketball player. He played college basketball for the Arizona State Sun Devils. As a senior in 2014, he was the leading shot blocker in NCAA Division I and was named the defensive player of the year in the Pac-12 Conference.

== College career ==
Bachynski, a 7'2" center from Calgary, Alberta, played four years for the Arizona State Sun Devils in the United States. Bachynski made his mark as a defensive player, setting the Pac-12 Conference record for career blocked shots. Bachynski also led the NCAA Division I in blocks in his senior season of 2013–14. He was named Pac-12 Defensive Player of the Year at the conclusion of the season. As a junior, Bachynski recorded the first triple-double in Arizona State history with 13 points, 12 rebounds, and 12 blocked shots against Cal State Northridge on December 8, 2012.

== Professional career ==
=== 2014–15 season ===
After going undrafted in the 2014 NBA draft, Bachynski joined the Charlotte Hornets for the 2014 NBA Summer League. On August 1, 2014, he signed a one-year deal with Eskişehir Basket of the Turkish Basketball League. He later parted ways with Eskişehir in mid-November after appearing in just four games.

On February 13, 2015, Bachynski was acquired by the Westchester Knicks of the NBA Development League. In 18 games for the Knicks, he averaged 6.6 points and 5.3 rebounds per game.

=== 2015–16 season ===
In June 2015, Bachynski joined the Orlando Magic white team for the Orlando Summer League and the Toronto Raptors for the Las Vegas Summer League. On September 28, 2015, he signed with the Detroit Pistons. He was later waived by the Pistons on October 23, after appearing in two preseason games, where he totaled six points and one rebound in six minutes. On November 2, he was reacquired by Westchester. On February 9, 2016, he was named in the East All-Star team for the 2016 NBA D-League All-Star Game as a replacement for Lorenzo Brown, after averaging 13.1 points, 6.7 rebounds, and 2.6 blocks over 26.3 minutes in 32 games. At the season's end, he was named to the All-NBA D-League Third Team and All-NBA D-League All-Defensive Team.

=== 2016–17 season ===
On August 26, 2016, he signed with Nagoya Diamond Dolphins of the B.League.

=== 2017-18 season ===
On August 26, 2017, he signed with Obradoiro CAB of the Spanish Liga ACB

=== 2018-19 season ===
On September 4, 2018, he signed with Formosa Dreamers of the ASEAN Basketball League. He was cut before the season started due to health concern.

=== 2019-20 season ===
For the 2019–20 season, Bachynski is serving as a Player Enhancement Coach for the Boston Celtics

== Canadian national team ==
Bachynski represented Canada in the 2013 Summer Universiade.

== Personal life ==
Bachynski, a member of the Church of Jesus Christ of Latter-day Saints, delayed his basketball career to serve a two-year Mormon mission in Miami, Florida. His younger brother, Dallin, played college basketball for the University of Utah, and professional basketball for the Sendai 89ers.
