= Ron Riley (basketball, born 1973) =

American basketball player

Personal information
- Born: December 23, 1973 (age 52) Las Vegas, Nevada, U.S.
- Listed height: 6 ft 5 in (1.96 m)
- Listed weight: 200 lb (91 kg)

Career information
- High school: Clark (Las Vegas, Nevada)
- College: Arizona State (1992–1996)
- NBA draft: 1996: 2nd round, 47th overall pick
- Drafted by: Seattle SuperSonics
- Playing career: 1996–2004
- Position: Small forward

Career history

Playing
- 1996–1997: Rockford Lightning
- 1999: Gallitos de Isabela
- 1999–2001: Arkadia Traiskirchen
- 2001–2002: Rockford Lightning
- 2002: Alaska Aces
- 2003: Huntsville Flight
- 2003–2004: Al Wehda
- 2004: Las Vegas Rattlers

Coaching
- 2007–2009: Univ. of Great Falls (assistant)

Career highlights
- CBA All-Rookie Second Team (1997)
- Stats at Basketball Reference

Ron Riley (born December 23, 1973) is an American former professional basketball player. He was drafted to the Seattle SuperSonics in 1996. Seattle then traded the draft right to the Detroit Pistons.

Riley played college basketball for the Arizona State Sun Devils. As of 2022, he is ranked 4th in all-time points scored.

Riley played for the Rockford Lightning of the Continental Basketball Association (CBA) from 1996 to 1997 and during the 2001–02 season. He was selected to the CBA All-Rookie Second Team in 1997.
