= Pac-12 Conference men's basketball =

College basketball conference

Men's college basketball in the Pac-12 Conference began in 1915 with the formation of the Pacific Coast Conference (PCC). Principal members of the PCC founded the Athletic Association of Western Universities (AAWU) in 1959, and subsequently went by the names Big Five, Big Six, Pacific-8, and Pacific-10, becoming the Pac-12 in 2011. The Pac-12 includes the PCC as part of its history despite the two leagues being formed under separate charters. The most recent competing squads in the Pac-12 were the Arizona Wildcats, Arizona State Sun Devils, California Golden Bears, Colorado Buffaloes, Oregon Ducks, Oregon State Beavers, Stanford Cardinal, UCLA Bruins, USC Trojans, Utah Utes, Washington Huskies, and Washington State Cougars.

All members of the Pac-12 joined other conferences after the 2023–24 season. Oregon, UCLA, USC, and Washington left for the Big Ten Conference; Arizona, Arizona State, Colorado, and Utah joined the Big 12 Conference; California and Stanford joined the Atlantic Coast Conference, and the last two Pac-12 members, Oregon State and Washington State, joined the West Coast Conference.

The conference reemerged with nine total members for the 2026–27 season.

As of 2026, Pac-12 schools have won 15 Division I national titles. This was tied with the Atlantic Coast Conference for the most of any conference. Oregon won the first NCAA tournament in 1939. UCLA has won 11 national titles, the most of any Division I team. Arizona has won the most recent national title, winning in 1997. Stanford in 1942, Utah in 1944 and California in 1959 are the other NCAA champions.

== List of seasons ==
Season	Champion	
Season	Regular season(#)	Conference tournament (#)
1915–16	California (1)	
1915–16	Oregon State (1)	
1916–17	Washington State (Note: Though the first national championship tournament was not held until 1939, the Helms Athletic Foundation retroactively selected national champions for prior years, including Washington State for 1917.)	
1917–18	No official conference competition	
1918–19	Oregon (1)	
1919–20	Stanford (1)	
1920–21	California (2)	
1920–21	Stanford (2)	
1921–22	Idaho (1)	
1922–23	Idaho (2)	
1923–24	California (3)	
1924–25	California (4)	
1925–26	California (5)	
1926–27	California (6)	
1927–28	USC (1)	
1928–29	California (7)	
1929–30	USC (2)	
1930–31	Washington (1)	
1931–32	California (8)	
1932–33	Oregon State (2)	
1933–34	Washington (2)	
1934–35	USC (3)	
1935–36	Stanford (3)	
1936–37	Stanford (4)	
1937–38	Stanford (5)	
1938–39	**Oregon** (2)	
1939–40	USC (4)	
1940–41	Washington State (2)	
1941–42	**Stanford** (6)	
1942–43	Washington (3)	
1943–44	California (9) (Note: Utah was national champion in 1944, prior to its joining the Pac-12 in 2011.)	
1943–44	Washington (4)	
1944–45	Oregon (3)	
1944–45	UCLA (1)	
1945–46	California (10)	
1946–47	Oregon State (3)	
1947–48	Washington (5)	
1948–49	Oregon State (4)	
1949–50	UCLA (2)	
1950–51	Washington (6)	
1951–52	UCLA (3)	
1952–53	Washington (7)	
1953–54	USC (5)	
1954–55	Oregon State (5)	
1955–56	UCLA (4)	
1956–57	California (11)	
1957–58	California (12)	
1957–58	Oregon State (6)	
1958–59	**California** (13)	
1959–60	California (14)	
1960–61	USC (6)	
1961–62	UCLA (5)	
1962–63	Stanford (7)	
1962–63	UCLA (6)	
1963–64	**UCLA** (7)	
1964–65	**UCLA** (8)	
1965–66	Oregon State (7)	
1966–67	**UCLA** (9)	
1967–68	**UCLA** (10)	
1968–69	**UCLA** (11)	
1969–70	**UCLA** (12)	
1970–71	**UCLA** (13)	
1971–72	**UCLA** (14)	
1972–73	**UCLA** (15)	
1973–74	UCLA (16)	
1974–75	**UCLA** (17)	
1975–76	UCLA (18)	
1976–77	UCLA (19)	
1977–78	UCLA (20)	
1978–79	UCLA (21)	
1979–80	Oregon State (8)	
1980–81	Oregon State (9)	
1981–82	Oregon State (10)	
1982–83	UCLA (22)	
1983–84	Oregon State (11)	
1983–84	Washington (8)	
1984–85	USC (7)	
1984–85	Washington (9)	
1985–86	Arizona (1)	
1986–87	UCLA (23)	UCLA (1)
1987–88	Arizona (2)	Arizona (1)
1988–89	Arizona (3)	Arizona (2)
1989–90	Arizona (4)	Arizona (3)
1989–90	Oregon State (12)	Arizona (3)
1990–91	Arizona (5)	
1991–92	UCLA (24)	
1992–93	Arizona (6)	
1993–94	Arizona (7)	
1994–95	**UCLA** (25)	
1995–96	UCLA (26)	
1996–97	UCLA (27) (Note: Arizona was national champion in 1997, though it did not win the conference.)	
1997–98	Arizona (8)	
1998–99	Stanford (8)	
1999–00	Arizona (9)	
1999–00	Stanford (9)	
2000–01	Stanford (10)	
2001–02	Oregon (4)	Arizona (4)
2002–03	Arizona (10)	Oregon (1)
2003–04	Stanford (11)	Stanford (1)
2004–05	Arizona (11)	Washington (1)
2005–06	UCLA (28)	UCLA (2)
2006–07	UCLA (29)	Oregon (2)
2007–08	UCLA (30)	UCLA (3)
2008–09	Washington (10)	USC (1)
2009–10	California (15)	Washington (2)
2010–11	Arizona (12)	Washington (3)
2011–12	Washington (11)	Colorado (1)
2012–13	UCLA (31)	Oregon (3)
2013–14	Arizona (13)	UCLA (4)
2014–15	Arizona (14)	Arizona (5)
2015–16	Oregon (5)	Oregon (4)
2016–17	Arizona (15)	Arizona (6)
2016–17	Oregon (6)	Arizona (6)
2017–18	Arizona (16)	Arizona (7)
2018–19	Washington (12)	Oregon (5)
2019–20	Oregon (7)	Cancelled—COVID-19 pandemic
2020–21	Oregon (8)	Oregon State (1)
2021–22	Arizona (17)	Arizona (8)
2022–23	UCLA (32)	Arizona (9)
2023–24	Arizona (18)	Oregon (6)

Bold text denotes National Champion.

== Championships by school ==
School	Regular season		Conference tournament	
School	No.	Last	No.	Last
Oregon State	12	1990	1	2021
Washington State	2	1941	0	–
Boise State	0	–	0	–
Colorado State	0	–	0	–
Fresno State	0	–	0	–
Gonzaga	0	–	0	–
San Diego State	0	–	0	–
Texas State	0	–	0	–
Utah State	0	–	0	–

=== Performance by team ===
Through 2024 tournament

Teams (# of titles)		1987	1988	1989	1990	2002	2003	2004	2005	2006	2007	2008	2009	2010	2011	2012	2013	2014	2015	2016	2017	2018	2019	2020*	2021	2022	2023	2024
Pac-12 (27)		(10)	(10)	(10)	(10)	(8)	(8)	(8)	(8)	(10)	(10)	(10)	(10)	(9)	(10)	(12)	(12)	(12)	(12)	(12)	(12)	(12)	(12)	(12)	(11)	(12)	(12)	(12)
1	Oregon State (1)	QF	F	SF	QF	•	QF	•	SF	QF	1R	1R	1R	QF	QF	SF	1R	1R	1R	QF	1R	QF	QF	QF	C	1R	1R	1R
2	Washington State (0)	1R	SF	QF	1R	•	•	QF	QF	1R	SF	SF	QF	1R	QF	1R	1R	1R	1R	1R	1R	1R	1R	QF	1R	QF	QF	SF
3	Boise State (0)	•	•	•	•	•	•	•	•	•	•	•	•	•	•	•	•	•	•	•	•	•	•	•	•	•	•	•
4	Colorado State (0)	•	•	•	•	•	•	•	•	•	•	•	•	•	•	•	•	•	•	•	•	•	•	•	•	•	•	•
5	Fresno State (0)	•	•	•	•	•	•	•	•	•	•	•	•	•	•	•	•	•	•	•	•	•	•	•	•	•	•	•
6	Gonzaga (0)	•	•	•	•	•	•	•	•	•	•	•	•	•	•	•	•	•	•	•	•	•	•	•	•	•	•	•
7	San Diego State (0)	•	•	•	•	•	•	•	•	•	•	•	•	•	•	•	•	•	•	•	•	•	•	•	•	•	•	•
8	Texas State (0)	•	•	•	•	•	•	•	•	•	•	•	•	•	•	•	•	•	•	•	•	•	•	•	•	•	•	•
9	Utah State (0)	•	•	•	•	•	•	•	•	•	•	•	•	•	•	•	•	•	•	•	•	•	•	•	•	•	•	•

Key

C	Champion
F	Runner-up
SF	Semifinals
QF	Quarterfinals
RR	Round number
•	Did not participate

*The 2020 tournament was canceled after the first-round games due to the ongoing COVID-19 pandemic.

=== All-time school records (ranked according to all time wins) ===
Through end of the 2025–26 regular season. Records reflect official NCAA results, including any forfeits or win vacating.

#	Pac–12	Record	Win %	Pac–12 regular season championships	Pac–12 Conference Tournament championships	National championships
1	Oregon State	1862–1463	.560	12	1	0
2	Utah State	1775–1184	.600	0	0	0
3	Washington State	1718–1633	.513	2	0	0
4	Gonzaga	1508–736	.672	0	0	0
5	San Diego State	1485–1125	.569	0	0	0
6	Texas State	1442–1258	.534	0	0	0
7	Colorado State	1418–1350	.512	0	0	0
8	Fresno State	1413–1236	.533	0	0	0
9	Boise State	951–719	.569	0	0	0

=== Pac-12 team vs. team results ===
This table summarizes the all-time head-to-head results between teams. Results are through the 2021–22 season.

	Arizona	ASU	California	Colorado	Oregon	OSU	Stanford	UCLA	USC	Utah	Washington	WSU
vs. Arizona	–	86–159	31–72	16–24	37–53	22–72	32–71	63–48	46–77	32–36	31–60	17–71
vs. Arizona State	159–86	–	42–49	15–14	48–47	47–49	53–43	74–24	61–45	35–25	46–45	42–45
vs. California	72–31	49–42	–	21–18	68–85	68–91	129–155	145–103	133–136	22–17	87–87	59–83
vs. Colorado	24–16	11–15	18–21	–	12–16	11–21	10–20	19–7	10–16	26–33	21–15	7–17
vs. Oregon	53–37	47–48	85–68	16–12	–	191–171	58–96	103–40	69–58	10–30	192–121	128–175
vs. Oregon State	70–22	49–47	91–68	21–11	171–191	–	76–76	102–40	80–67	22–18	166–144	129–175
vs. Stanford	71–31	43–53	155–129	20–10	96–58	76–76	–	151–97	130–129	25–17	75–83	64–84
vs. UCLA	48–63	24–74	103–145	7–19	40–93	40–103	97–151	–	116–146	10–17	43–107	19–114
vs. USC	77–46	45–61	136–133	16–10	59–69	67–80	129–130	146–116	–	26–26	75–82	49–82
vs. Utah	36–32	25–35	17–22	33–26	30–10	18–22	17–25	17–10	26–26	–	15–19	6–29
vs. Washington	60–31	45–46	87–87	15–21	121–192	144–166	83–75	107–43	82–75	19–15	–	108–185
vs. Washington State	71–17	45–42	83–59	17–7	175–128	175–129	84–64	114–19	82–49	29–6	185–108	–
Total	711–412	469–622	848–853	197–172	857–942	859–980	768–906	1032–568	835–824	256–240	936–771	628–1060

== Conference honors ==
The following honors are presented annually by the conference:

- Coach of the Year
- Player of the Year
- Freshman of the Year
- Defensive Player of the Year
- Sixth Man of the Year
- Most Improved Player of The Year
- All-Conference team
- All-Defensive team
- All-Freshman team

Former players and coaches who have made a significant impact to the tradition and heritage of the conference are recognized in the Pac-12 Hall of Honor. It was exclusively for men's basketball until 2018, when it was opened to all sports.

=== All-time statistical leaders ===
Career

Points
Rank	Player	Team	Points
1.	Don MacLean	UCLA	2,608
2.	Sean Elliott	Arizona	2,555
3.	Chasson Randle	Stanford	2,375
4.	Todd Lichti	Stanford	2,336
5.	Lew Alcindor	UCLA	2,325

Scoring average
Rank	Player	Team	PPG
1.	Lew Alcindor	UCLA	26.4
2.	Harold Miner	USC	23.5
3.	Mel Counts	Oregon State	22.2
3.	Terrell Brandon	Oregon	22.2
5.	Ike Diogu	Arizona State	20.7

Rebounds
Rank	Player	Team	Rebounds
1.	Mel Counts	Oregon State	1,375
2.	Bill Walton	UCLA	1,370
3.	Lew Alcindor	UCLA	1,367
4.	Jon Brockman	Washington	1,283
5.	Adam Keefe	Stanford	1,119

Assists
Rank	Player	Team	Assists
1.	Gary Payton	Oregon State	938
2.	Pooh Richardson	UCLA	833
3.	Russell Brown	Arizona	810
4.	Brevin Knight	Stanford	780
5.	Brandon Granville	USC	779

Steals
Rank	Player	Team	Steals
1.	Matisse Thybulle	Washington	331
2.	Gary Payton	Oregon State	321
3.	Brevin Knight	Stanford	298
4.	Eddie House	Arizona State	258
5.	Stevin Smith	Arizona State	246

Blocked shots
Rank	Player	Team	Blocks
1.	Jordan Bachynski	Arizona State	314
2.	Anthony Cook	Arizona	278
3.	Channing Frye	Arizona	258
4.	Taj Gibson	USC	253
5.	Jordan Bell	Oregon	233

Single Season

Points
Rank	Player	Team	Points
1.	Lew Alcindor	UCLA	870
2.	Khalid Reeves	Arizona	848
3.	Bob Houbregs	Washington	846
4.	Harold Miner	USC	789
5.	Mel Counts	Oregon State	775

Single season scoring average
Rank	Player	Team	PPG
1.	Lew Alcindor	UCLA	29.0
2.	Mel Counts	Oregon State	26.7
3.	Terrell Brandon	Oregon	26.6
3.	Harold Miner	USC	26.3
5.	Lew Alcindor	UCLA	26.2

Rebounds
Rank	Player	Team	Rebounds
1.	Bill Walton	UCLA	506
2.	Mel Counts	Oregon State	489
3.	Mel Counts	Oregon State	485
4.	Lew Alcindor	UCLA	466
4.	Adam Keefe	UCLA	466

Assists
Rank	Player	Team	Assists
1.	Ahlon Lewis	Arizona State	294
2.	Jordan McLaughlin	USC	281
3.	Lonzo Ball	UCLA	274
4.	Jason Kidd	California	272
5.	Larry Drew II	UCLA	256

Steals
Rank	Player	Team	Steals
1.	Matisse Thybulle	Washington	126
2.	Jason Kidd	California	110
3.	Matisse Thybulle	Washington	101
4.	Gary Payton	Oregon State	100
5.	2 tied	2 tied	95

Blocked shots
Rank	Player	Team	Blocks
1.	Jordan Bachynski	Arizona State	133
2.	Jordan Bachynski	Arizona State	120
3.	Mario Bennett	Arizona State	115
4.	Rodger Farrington	Arizona State	113
5.	Chris Boucher	Oregon	110
