= Pac-12 Conference Men's Basketball Freshman of the Year =

Pac-12 Men's Basketball Freshman of the Year
- Awarded for: The most outstanding freshman male basketball player in the Pac-12
- Country: United States
- First award: 1979
- Currently held by: Myles Rice, Washington State

The Pac-12 Freshman of the Year is an annual award in the Pac-12 Conference presented to its top freshman player in men's basketball. The winner is chosen by the Pac-12 coaches. The honor began in 1978–79, when it was known as the Rookie of the Year and players in their first year in the conference, including transfers, were eligible. Junior guard Bryan Rison of Washington State was the first honoree and the only non-freshman to ever win. The candidates were limited to freshman starting in 1983–84, when the award was renamed to Freshman of the Year. The conference was known as the Pacific-10 before becoming the Pac-12 in 2011. Four winners were also named the conference's player of the year in the same year: Shareef Abdur-Rahim (California, 1996), Kevin Love (UCLA, 2008), Deandre Ayton (Arizona, 2018) and Evan Mobley (USC, 2021).

== Key ==
†	Co-winners.

== Winners ==
Season	Player	School	Position	Ref
1978–79	Bryan Rison	Washington State	Guard	
1979–80	Byron Scott	Arizona State	Guard	
1980–81	John Revelli	Stanford	Forward	
1981–82	Johnny Rogers	Stanford	Forward	
1982–83	Dave Butler	California	Forward	
1983–84	Chris Welp	Washington	Center	
1984–85	Leonard Taylor	California	Forward	
1985–86^{†}	Sean Elliott	Arizona	Forward	
1985–86^{†}	Pooh Richardson	UCLA	Guard	
1986–87	Gary Payton	Oregon State	Guard	
1987–88	Mike Hayward	Washington	Forward	
1988–89	Don MacLean	UCLA	Forward	
1989–90	Harold Miner	USC	Guard	
1990–91	Jamal Faulkner	Arizona State	Forward	
1991–92	Mark Pope	Washington	Forward	
1992–93	Jason Kidd	California	Guard	
1993–94	Brevin Knight	Stanford	Guard	
1994–95	Tremaine Fowlkes	California	Forward	
1995–96	Shareef Abdur-Rahim	California	Forward	
1996–97	Mike Bibby	Arizona	Guard	
1997–98	Baron Davis	UCLA	Guard	
1998–99	Michael Wright	Arizona	Forward	
1999–2000^{†}	Casey Jacobsen	Stanford	Forward	
1999–2000^{†}	Jason Kapono	UCLA	Forward	
2000–01	Luke Ridnour	Oregon	Guard	
2001–02	Salim Stoudamire	Arizona	Guard	
2002–03	Ike Diogu	Arizona State	Forward	
2003–04	Leon Powe	California	Forward	
2004–05	Jordan Farmar	UCLA	Guard	
2005–06	Luc Richard Mbah a Moute	UCLA	Forward	
2006–07	Chase Budinger	Arizona	Forward	
2007–08	Kevin Love	UCLA	Forward	
2008–09	Isaiah Thomas	Washington	Guard	
2009–10	Derrick Williams	Arizona	Forward	
2010–11	Allen Crabbe	California	Guard	
2011–12	Tony Wroten	Washington	Guard	
2012–13^{†}	Shabazz Muhammad	UCLA	Guard	
2012–13^{†}	Jahii Carson	Arizona State	Guard	
2013–14	Aaron Gordon	Arizona	Forward	
2014–15	Stanley Johnson	Arizona	Forward	
2015–16	Jaylen Brown	California	Forward	
2016–17	Lonzo Ball	UCLA	Guard	
2017–18	Deandre Ayton	Arizona	Center	
2018–19	Luguentz Dort	Arizona State	Guard	
2019–20	Zeke Nnaji	Arizona	Forward	
2020–21	Evan Mobley	USC	Forward	
2021–22	Harrison Ingram	Stanford	Forward	
2022–23	Adem Bona	UCLA	Center	
2023–24	Myles Rice	Washington State	Guard	

== Winners by school ==
School	Winners	Years
Arizona	10	1986, 1997, 1999, 2002, 2007, 2010, 2014, 2015, 2018, 2020
UCLA	10	1986, 1989, 1998, 2000, 2005, 2006, 2008, 2013, 2017, 2023
California	8	1983, 1985, 1993, 1995, 1996, 2004, 2011, 2016
Arizona State	5	1980, 1991, 2003, 2013, 2019
Stanford	5	1981, 1982, 1994, 2000, 2022
Washington	5	1984, 1988, 1992, 2009, 2012
Washington State	2	1979, 2024
USC	2	1990, 2021
Oregon	1	2001
Oregon State	1	1987
Colorado	0	N/A
Utah	0	N/A
