= 2008–09 UCLA Bruins men's basketball team =

American college basketball season

2008–09 UCLA Bruins men's basketball

NCAA tournament, Round of 32
- Conference: Pacific-10 Conference

Ranking
- Coaches: No. 18
- AP: No. 18
- Record: 26–9 (13–5 Pac-10)
- Head coach: Ben Howland (6th season)
- Assistant coaches: Donny Daniels; Scott Duncan; Scott Garson
- Home arena: Pauley Pavilion

2008–09 Pacific-10 Conference men's basketball standings
	Conf.				Overall
Team	W		L	PCT	W		L	PCT
No. 15 Washington	14	–	4	.778	26	–	9	.743
No. 18 UCLA	13	–	5	.722	26	–	9	.743
No. 19 Arizona State	11	–	7	.611	25	–	10	.714
California	11	–	7	.611	22	–	11	.667
USC†	9	–	9	.500	22	–	13	.629
Arizona	9	–	9	.500	21	–	14	.600
Washington State	8	–	10	.444	17	–	16	.515
Oregon State	7	–	11	.389	18	–	18	.500
Stanford	6	–	12	.333	20	–	14	.588
Oregon	2	–	16	.111	8	–	23	.258
† Conference tournament winner Rankings from AP Poll

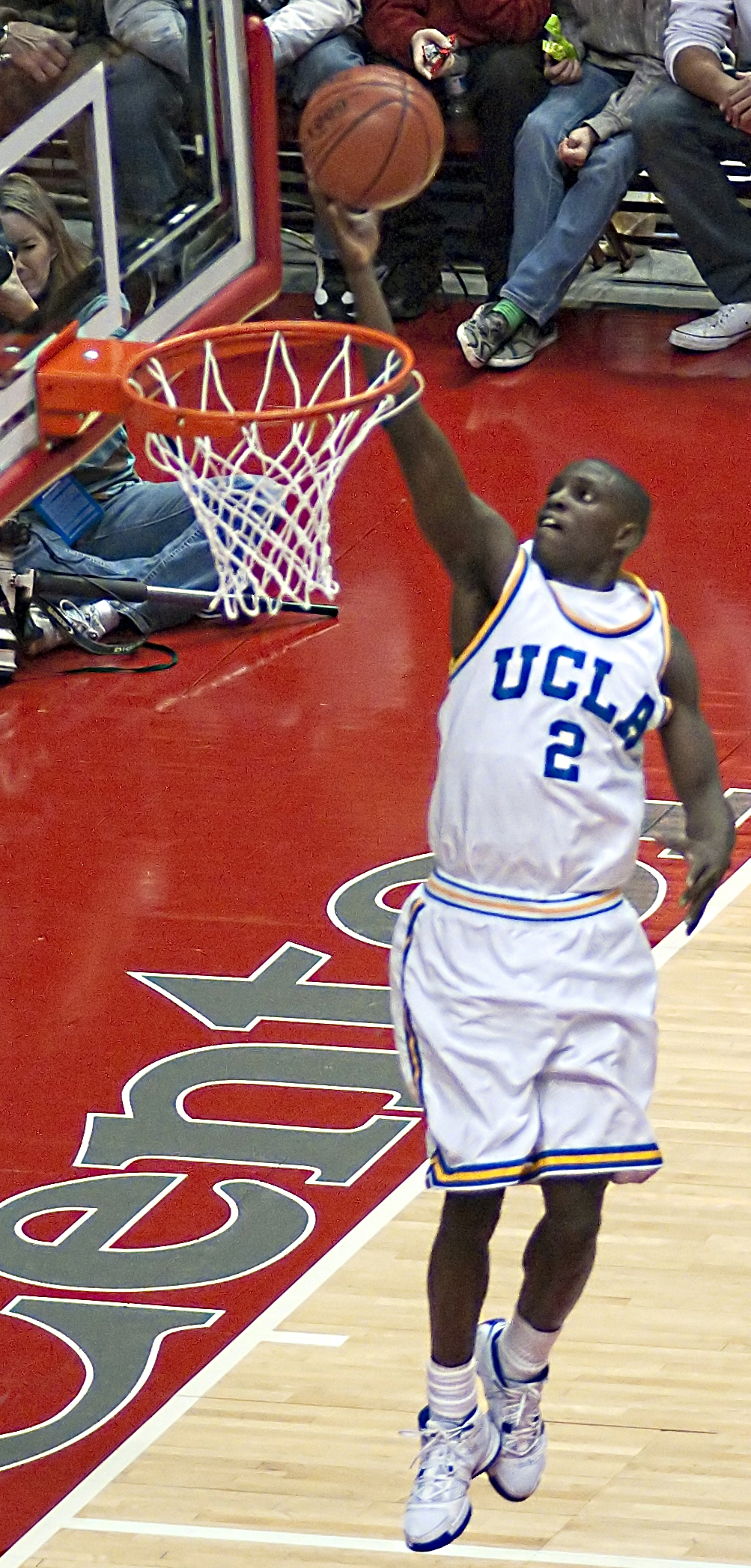
Darren Collison at the DePaul game

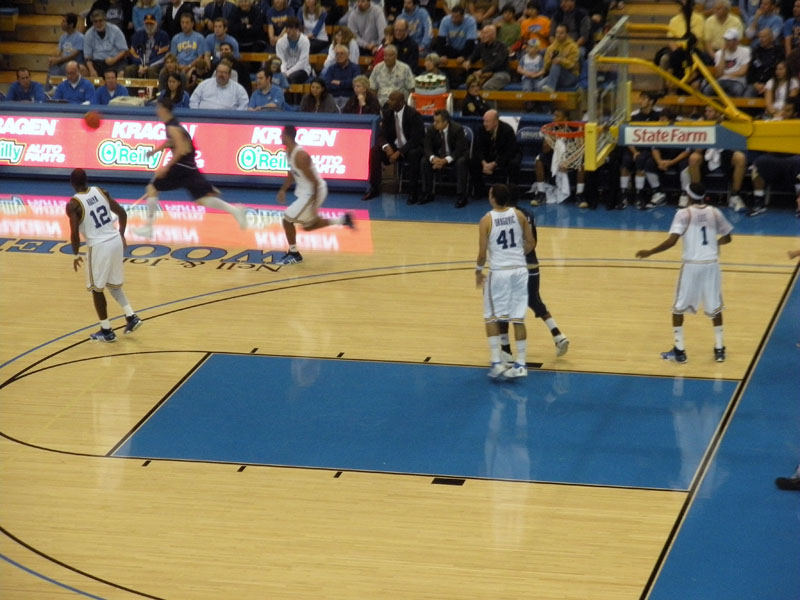
Pauley Pavilion, UCLA vs. FIU

The 2008–09 UCLA Bruins men's basketball team opened the season on November 3 when it took on Cal Baptist in an exhibition game in Pauley Pavilion. The Bruins participated in the 2K Sports Classic, Big 12/Pac-10 Hardwood Series, and the John R. Wooden Classic in the Honda Center.

The team opened the season with the following starters: Alfred Aboya (Center), James Keefe (Power forward), Josh Shipp (Small forward), Jrue Holiday (Shooting guard) and Darren Collison (Point guard).

The team opted not to have an October 17, 2008 Midnight Madness celebration this year. Practices began on Saturday, October 18, as they prepared for the first exhibition game on Monday, November 3. The team has been picked to finish first in the Pac-10 conference again, over Arizona State, USC and Arizona.

Freshman Tyler Trapani (#4), great-grandson of former head coach John Wooden, had joined the team.

Three players from last season's team, Russell Westbrook, Kevin Love and Luc Richard Mbah a Moute were chosen to play in the NBA. Westbrook was picked by the Seattle SuperSonics as the fourth overall pick, while Love was the fifth pick by the Memphis Grizzlies, and Mbah a Moute was picked by the Milwaukee Bucks, the 37th pick in the NBA draft.

The team finished the season by losing to Villanova 89–69 in the second round of the 2009 NCAA Division I men's basketball tournament. The senior class of Alfred Aboya, Darren Collison and Josh Shipp finished their careers with the most wins in school history with 123 The distinction was relative, as John Wooden's legendary teams played shorter seasons and freshmen were ineligible.

== Highlights ==
During half-time of the January 31 game against Stanford, the Bruins' 1963–64 and 1964–65 National Championship teams were honored, along with their 98-year-old former coach John R. Wooden, who told the crowd that he can still remember those years. The game also marked the Coaches vs. Cancer Suits and Sneakers Awareness Weekend with both teams wore white sneakers with their suits and ties.

A week later at the Notre Dame game, Troy Aikman was honored for his induction into the College Football Hall of Fame and for having recently completed his courses for a degree in sociology during half-time. A plaque was presented to Aikman to be permanently displayed at UCLA's Hall of Fame.

- Most points in a game – 113, UCLA vs. Wyoming, December 23, 2008
- 2nd most field goals made – 41, UCLA vs. Wyoming, December 23, 2008
- Most 3-point FG made – 33 (tie), UCLA vs. Loyola Marymount, December 17, 2008
- Highest 3-pt percentage – .733 (11–15), UCLA vs. Stanford, January 29, 2009
- Most steals – 20, UCLA vs. Wyoming, December 23, 2008
- Most turnovers – 24, UCLA vs. Prairie View A&M, November 12, 2008

Seniors Alfred Aboya and Darren Collison played more games for UCLA than any other player in history, passing Mitchell Butler's 130 games from 1990 to 1993.

The 72–54 DePaul victory in the December 13, 2008 John R. Wooden Classic game was coach Ben Howland's 300th career victory.

Sidney Wicks and his 1968–69 championship team were honored during halftime of the final home game against Oregon on Saturday, March 7, 2009.

These former players are now playing on an NBA team: Jason Kapono, Arron Afflalo, Dan Gadzuric, Luc Mbah a Moute, Ryan Hollins, Baron Davis, Trevor Ariza, Jordan Farmar, Matt Barnes, Kevin Love, Earl Watson, and Russell Westbrook.

UCLA's three-year reign came to an end when Washington defeated Washington State, 67–60 to win the regular season Pac-10 title.

Darren Collison was named to the All-Pac-10 team; Josh Shipp was named to the second team; Alfred Aboya was honorable mention on the All-Pac-10 team; Jrue Holiday was named to the All-Freshman team; and Alfred Aboya and Darren Collison were named to the All-Defensive team.

Darren Collison was an honorable mention in the 2008–09 AP All-America basketball teams. Additionally, he was named the 2009 recipient of the Frances Pomeroy Naismith Award by the Naismith Memorial Basketball Hall of Fame. The award goes to the "nation's outstanding senior male collegian 6'0" and under who has excelled both athletically and academically."

In the NCAA National Championship tournament, Alfred Aboya scored two free-throw points with 48 seconds remaining in the game to help UCLA get by VCU in the first round at the East Regional in Philadelphia's Wachovia Center. Top scorers in the game were Eric Maynor (21) for VCU and Josh Shipp (16) for UCLA.

In the second round, with six Wildcats scoring double-digit points, Villanova ended UCLA's hope of going to the Final Four for the fourth time in a row. Dante Cunningham had 18 points; Reggie Redding and Corey Fisher had 13; Corey Stokes put up 12; eleven points came from Scottie Reynolds and ten points were put up by Dwayne Anderson for the winning team. Josh Shipp had 18 points and Alfred Aboya had 8 rebounds for UCLA.

On Friday, April 3, Alfred Aboya will play in the Hershey's all-star game, which is part of the kickoff celebration to Final Four weekend at Ford Field.

The team finished the season with an attendance of 392,980 in 35 games, averaging 11,228 fans per game.

Freshman guard Jrue Holiday announced on April 9 that he would make himself eligible for the NBA draft without signing with an agent.

== Recruiting class ==
The incoming class of Jerime Anderson, Drew Gordon, Jrue Holiday, Malcolm Lee, and J'Mison Morgan was ranked No. 1 in the nation.

College recruiting
Name	Hometown	School	Height	Weight	Commit date
Jerime Anderson; PG	Anaheim, CA	Canyon HS	6 ft 2 in (1.88 m)	183 lb (83 kg)	Sep 6, 2006
Jerime Anderson; PG	Recruit ratings: Scout: Rivals: (94)				
Drew Gordon; PF	San Jose, CA	Archbishop Mitty HS	6 ft 9 in (2.06 m)	230 lb (100 kg)	May 6, 2007
Drew Gordon; PF	Recruit ratings: Scout: Rivals: (96)				
Jrue Holiday; SG	North Hollywood, CA	Campbell Hall HS	6 ft 3 in (1.91 m)	180 lb (82 kg)	Jul 3, 2007
Jrue Holiday; SG	Recruit ratings: Scout: Rivals: (98)				
Malcolm Lee; SG	Moreno Valley, CA	John W. North HS	6 ft 5 in (1.96 m)	200 lb (91 kg)	Nov 16, 2006
Malcolm Lee; SG	Recruit ratings: Scout: Rivals: (96)				
J'mison Morgan; C	Dallas, TX	South Oak Cliff, HS	6 ft 10 in (2.08 m)	240 lb (110 kg)	Jul 24, 2008
J'mison Morgan; C	Recruit ratings: Scout: Rivals: (96)				
Overall recruit ranking: Scout: 1 Rivals: 1 ESPN: 1
Note: In many cases, Scout, Rivals, 247Sports, On3, and ESPN may conflict in their listings of height and weight.; In these cases, the average was taken. ESPN grades are on a 100-point scale.; Sources: "UCLA Commit List for 2008". Rivals.; "Men's Basketball Recruiting". Scout.; "ESPN – UCLA Bruins Basketball Recruiting 2008". ESPN.; "Scout.com Team Recruiting Rankings". Scout.; "2008 Team Ranking". Rivals.

== Roster ==
2008–09 UCLA Bruins men's basketball team
Players
Coaches

Pos.	#	Name	Height	Weight	Year	Hometown
G	10	Mustafa Abdul-Hamid	6 ft 2 in (1.88 m)	195 lb (88 kg)	Jr	St. Louis, Missouri
F/C	12	Alfred Aboya (C)	6 ft 9 in (2.06 m)	245 lb (111 kg)	Sr	Yaounde, Cameroon
G	5	Jerime Anderson	6 ft 1 in (1.85 m)	165 lb (75 kg)	Fr	Anaheim, California
G	15	Blake Arnet (W)	6 ft 0 in (1.83 m)	185 lb (84 kg)	Fr	Laguna Niguel, California
G	2	Darren Collison (C)	6 ft 0 in (1.83 m)	160 lb (73 kg)	Sr	Rancho Cucamonga, California
G	24	Matt DeMarcus (W)	6 ft 3 in (1.91 m)	190 lb (86 kg)	Fr	Solvang, California
F/C	44	James Diefenbach (W)	6 ft 8 in (2.03 m)	250 lb (113 kg)	Sr	Newport Beach, California
F	41	Nikola Dragović	6 ft 9 in (2.06 m)	216 lb (98 kg)	Jr	Belgrade, Serbia
F	0	Drew Gordon	6 ft 8 in (2.03 m)	235 lb (107 kg)	Fr	San Jose, California
G	21	Jrue Holiday	6 ft 3 in (1.91 m)	180 lb (82 kg)	Fr	North Hollywood, California
F	13	James Keefe	6 ft 8 in (2.03 m)	231 lb (105 kg)	Jr	Rancho Santa Margarita, California
G	1	Malcolm Lee	6 ft 5 in (1.96 m)	180 lb (82 kg)	Fr	Riverside, California
C	22	J'mison Morgan	6 ft 10 in (2.08 m)	248 lb (112 kg)	Fr	Dallas, Texas
F/C	20	Michael Roll	6 ft 5 in (1.96 m)	200 lb (91 kg)	RS Jr	Aliso Viejo, California
F	30	Kevin Schmidt (W)	6 ft 8 in (2.03 m)	220 lb (100 kg)	Jr	San Jose, California
G/F	3	Josh Shipp (C)	6 ft 5 in (1.96 m)	220 lb (100 kg)	RS Sr	Los Angeles, California
G	11	Spencer Soo (W)	5 ft 8 in (1.73 m)	160 lb (73 kg)	So	Fresno, California
G	4	Tyler Trapani (W)	6 ft 0 in (1.83 m)	185 lb (84 kg)	Fr	Simi Valley, California

Head coach

Ben Howland (Weber State)

Assistant coach(es)

- Donny Daniels (Cal State Fullerton)
- Scott Duncan
- Scott Garson (UCSB)

Legend

- (C) Team captain
- (S) Suspended
- (I) Ineligible
- (W) Walk-on
- Injured
- Current redshirt

== Schedule ==
Date time, TV	Rank^{#}	Opponent^{#}	Result	Record	Site city, state
Exhibition
November 3, 2008*; 7:30 p.m., uclabruins.com		Cal Baptist; Exhibition	W 86–58		Pauley Pavilion; Los Angeles, CA
November 7, 2008*; 7:30 p.m., uclabruins.com		Biola; Exhibition	W 76–42		Pauley Pavilion; Los Angeles, CA
Non-Conference Season
November 12, 2008*; 7:00 p.m., ESPNU	No. 4	Prairie View A&M; 2K Sports Classic	W 82–58	1–0	Pauley Pavilion (7,190); Los Angeles, CA
November 13, 2008*; 8:00 p.m., ESPNU	No. 4	Miami (Ohio); 2k Sports Classic	W 64–59	2–0	Pauley Pavilion (7,802); Los Angeles, CA
November 20, 2008*; 6:30 p.m., ESPN2	No. 4	vs. Michigan; 2k Sports Classic	L 52–55	2–1	Madison Square Garden (9,440); New York, NY
November 21, 2008*; 2:00 p.m., ESPN2	No. 4	vs. Southern Illinois; 2k Sports Classic	W 77–60	3–1	Madison Square Garden (12,543); New York, NY
November 29, 2008*; 4:30 p.m., FSN Prime Ticket	No. 11	Florida International	W 89–54	4–1	Pauley Pavilion (8,940); Los Angeles, CA
December 4, 2008*; 7:00 p.m., ESPN	No. 9	at No. 8 Texas; Big 12/Pac-10 Hardwood Series	L 64–68	4–2	Frank Erwin Center (16,755); Austin, TX
December 7, 2008*; 7:30 p.m., FSN Prime Ticket	No. 9	Cal State Northridge	W 85–67	5–2	Pauley Pavilion (7,687); Los Angeles, CA
December 13, 2008*; 4:00 p.m., KCAL-TV	No. 14	vs. DePaul; John R. Wooden Classic	W 72–54	6–2	Honda Center (14,163); Anaheim, CA
December 17, 2008*; 8:00 p.m., FSN Prime Ticket	No. 12	Loyola Marymount	W 75–44	7–2	Pauley Pavilion (6,852); Los Angeles, CA
December 20, 2008*; 7:30 p.m., FSNW	No. 12	Mercer	W 76–59	8–2	Pauley Pavilion (8,111); Los Angeles, CA
December 23, 2008*; 7:30 p.m., FSN Prime Ticket	No. 10	Wyoming	W 113–62	9–2	Pauley Pavilion (8,795); Los Angeles, CA
December 28, 2008*; 12:00 p.m., FSN Prime Ticket	No. 10	Louisiana Tech	W 78–55	10–2	Pauley Pavilion (9,680); Los Angeles, CA
Conference Season
January 2, 2009; 7:30 p.m., FSN/FSNPT	No. 9	at Oregon State	W 69–46	11–2 (1–0)	Gill Coliseum (5,629); Corvallis, OR
January 4, 2009; 12:30 p.m., FSN/FSNPT	No. 9	at Oregon	W 83–74	12–2 (2–0)	McArthur Court (8,595); Eugene, OR
January 11, 2009; 7:30 p.m., FSN/FSNPT	No. 7	at USC	W 64–60	13–2 (3–0)	Galen Center (10,258); Los Angeles, CA
January 15, 2009; 8:00 p.m., FSN/FSNPT	No. 7	Arizona	W 83–60	14–2 (4–0)	Pauley Pavilion (11,228); Los Angeles, CA
January 17, 2009; 12:45 p.m., CBS	No. 7	No. 15 Arizona State	L 58–61 ^{OT}	14–3 (4–1)	Pauley Pavilion (11,659); Los Angeles, CA
January 22, 2009; 6:00 p.m., FSN/FSNPT	No. 11	at Washington State	W 61–59	15–3 (5–1)	Beasley Coliseum (8,434); Pullman, WA
January 24, 2009; 1:00 p.m., FSN/FSNPT	No. 11	at Washington	L 75–86	15–4 (5–2)	Hec Edmundson Pavilion (1,000); Seattle, WA
January 29, 2009; 7:30 p.m., FSN/FSNPT	No. 16	California	W 81–66	16–4 (6–2)	Pauley Pavilion (11,556); Los Angeles, CA
January 31, 2009; 12:30 p.m., ABC	No. 16	Stanford	W 97–63	17–4 (7–2)	Pauley Pavilion (11,129); Los Angeles, CA
February 4, 2009; 7:30 p.m., FSN Prime Ticket	No. 12	USC	W 76–60	18–4 (8–2)	Pauley Pavilion (12,179); Los Angeles, CA
February 7, 2009*; 10:00 a.m., CBS	No. 12	Notre Dame	W 89–63	19–4	Pauley Pavilion (11,492); Los Angeles, CA
February 12, 2009; 6:00 p.m., ESPN	No. 6	at No. 18 Arizona State	L 67–74	19–5 (8–3)	Wells Fargo Arena (13,368); Tempe, AZ
February 14, 2009; 10:00 a.m., CBS	No. 6	at Arizona	L 72–84	19–6 (8–4)	McKale Center (14,611); Tucson, AZ
February 19, 2009; 8:00 p.m., FSN/FSNW	No. 15	No. 19 Washington	W 85–74	20–6 (9–4)	Pauley Pavilion (11,145); Los Angeles, CA
February 21, 2009; 12:00 p.m., FSN/FSNPT	No. 15	Washington State	L 81–82	20–7 (9–5)	Pauley Pavilion (10,392); Los Angeles, CA
February 26, 2009; 7:00 p.m., FSN Prime Ticket	No. 19	at Stanford	W 76–71	21–7 (10–5)	Maples Pavilion (7,156); Stanford, CA
February 28, 2009; 6:00 p.m., ESPN	No. 19	at California; ESPN College Gameday	W 72–68	22–7 (11–5)	Haas Pavilion (11,877); Berkeley, CA
March 5, 2009; 7:30 p.m., FSN Prime Ticket	No. 17	Oregon State	W 79–54	23–7 (12–5)	Pauley Pavilion (10,348); Los Angeles, CA
March 7, 2009; 12:30 p.m., ABC	No. 17	Oregon	W 94–68	24–7 (13–5)	Pauley Pavilion (10,982); Los Angeles, CA
Pac-10 Tournament
March 12, 2009; 8:30 p.m., FSN	No. 14 (2)	vs. (7) Washington State; Quarterfinals	W 64–53	25–7	Staples Center (16,271); Los Angeles, CA
March 13, 2009; 8:30 p.m., FSN	No. 14 (2)	vs. (6) USC; Semifinals	L 55–65	25–8	Staples Center (18,497); Los Angeles, CA
NCAA tournament
March 19, 2009*; 6:45 p.m., CBS	No. 17 (6 E)	vs. (11 E) VCU; First Round	W 65–64	26–8	Wachovia Center (17,146); Philadelphia, PA
March 21, 2009*; 10:05 a.m., CBS	No. 17 (6 E)	vs. (3 E) Villanova; Second Round	L 69–89	26–9	Wachovia Center (19,894); Philadelphia, PA
*Non-conference game. ^{#}Rankings from AP Poll. (#) Tournament seedings in parentheses. All times are in Pacific Time.

== Rankings ==
Ranking movements Legend: ██ Increase in ranking ██ Decrease in ranking т = Tied with team above or below
	Week																			
Poll	Pre	1	2	3	4	5	6	7	8	9	10	11	12	13	14	15	16	17	18	Final
AP	4	4	13	12	16	14	13	12	10	9	13	17	15	11	20	22	20	15	18	Not released
Coaches	4	4	11	9	14	12	10	9	7 т	7	11	16	12	6	15	19	17	14	17	18

== See also ==
- 2008-09 NCAA Division I men's basketball rankings
- List of UCLA Bruins in the NBA

== Notes ==
- UCLA was swept by ASU for the first time since the 2002–03 season (and only the third time since ASU joined the Pac).
- UCLA only beat one ranked team (AP Top-25) this season: #19 Washington
