= 2008–09 Pacific-10 Conference men's basketball season =

2008–09 Pac-10 Men's Basketball Season
- League: NCAA Division I
- Sport: Basketball
- Teams: 10

Regular Season
- Champion: Washington
- Runners-up: UCLA
- Season MVP: James Harden, Arizona State

Tournament
- Champions: USC
- Runners-up: Arizona State
- Finals MVP: DeMar DeRozan – USC

Basketball seasons

2008–09 Pacific-10 Conference men's basketball standings
	Conf.				Overall
Team	W		L	PCT	W		L	PCT
No. 15 Washington	14	–	4	.778	26	–	9	.743
No. 18 UCLA	13	–	5	.722	26	–	9	.743
No. 19 Arizona State	11	–	7	.611	25	–	10	.714
California	11	–	7	.611	22	–	11	.667
USC†	9	–	9	.500	22	–	13	.629
Arizona	9	–	9	.500	21	–	14	.600
Washington State	8	–	10	.444	17	–	16	.515
Oregon State	7	–	11	.389	18	–	18	.500
Stanford	6	–	12	.333	20	–	14	.588
Oregon	2	–	16	.111	8	–	23	.258
† Conference tournament winner Rankings from AP Poll

The 2008–09 Pacific-10 Conference men's basketball season ended with six teams participating in the 2009 NCAA Men's Division I Basketball Tournament and two teams playing in the College Basketball Invitational (CBI).

The Washington Huskies won the regular season championship and its head coach Lorenzo Romar was named coach of the year.

Only three teams, Washington (#14), UCLA (#17) and Arizona State (#19), finished the season in the ESPN/USA Today Coaches Poll. They were #15, #18, and #19 respectively in the "AP Top 25" polls. However, in the final post-NCAA tournament coaches' poll, Arizona was also ranked, coming in at #24, behind Washington (#16), UCLA (#18) and Arizona State (#19).

== Pre-season ==
Mike Montgomery, who was previously the head coach of the Stanford Cardinal, came back to college coaching with the California Golden Bears. Craig Robinson, President Barack Obama's brother-in-law, became the head coach of the Oregon State. Lute Olson retired from Arizona and Russ Pennell took over.

Pac-10 teams participated in the Pac-10/Big 12 Series. They also took part in other x-season tournament games, including the 2K Sports Classic, and the John R. Wooden Classic in the Honda Center. Oregon Ducks played in the Maui Invitational Tournament and Washington State Cougars were there at the Legends Classic.

== Conference games ==
Washington was first in scoring offense and rebounding offense, while Washington State was first in scoring defense and free throw percentage in conference games. UCLA was on top in scoring margin, field goal percentage and 3-point field goal percentage.

Arizona led the conference in attendance with a total of 232,576 in 17 games, averaging 13,681 (14,545 capacity).

== Conference tournament ==
USC, the #6 seed team, won the 2009 Pacific Life Pacific-10 Conference men's basketball tournament at the Staples Center in Los Angeles, California on March 14, in front of a crowd of 16,988. The team defeated #4 seed Arizona State and won the school's first tournament championship. It was also the first time a team seeded sixth in the tournament went on to win the championship. The Trojans received the conference's automatic bid to the NCAA National Tournament.

First Round; March 11
8	Oregon State	54
9	Stanford	62
7	Washington State	62
10	Oregon	40

Quarterfinals; March 12
1	#13 Washington	85
9	Stanford	73
4	#23 Arizona State	68
5	Arizona	56
2	#15 UCLA	64
7	Washington State	53
3	California	75
6	USC	79

Semifinals; March 13
1	#13 Washington	65
4	#23 Arizona State	75
2	#15 UCLA	55
6	USC	65

Final; March 14
4	#23 Arizona State	63
6	USC	66

== Postseason ==
Six Pac-10 teams participated in the 2009 NCAA Men's Division I Basketball Tournament. Five teams won their first-round games, but only Arizona played in the regional semi-finals. The Wildcats lost to Louisville 103–64.

Oregon State and Stanford played in the College Basketball Invitational (CBI). Oregon State defeated Stanford (65–62) in over-time in the semi-finals and played UTEP for the championship in a best of three-game series. Oregon State won the CBI title by winning the first and third games over UTEP.

== Highlights and notes ==
At the end of March 2009, Washington State head coach Tony Bennett announced that he was leaving Washington State to take the head coaching job at Virginia. Ken Bone, formerly with Portland State, takes over.

On March 31, 2009, UCLA's senior point guard Darren Collison was named the 2009 recipient of the Frances Pomeroy Naismith Award by the Naismith Memorial Basketball Hall of Fame. The award goes to the "nation's outstanding senior male collegian 6'0" and under who has excelled both athletically and academically."

Russ Pennell left Arizona after a year coaching one of the country's premiere basketball programs. He coached the Wildcats to the Sweet 16, where the team lost the final game to Louisville, 103–64. USC's Tim Floyd went to Tucson for an interview of the Arizona job, but he decided to remain at USC. Sean Miller, former Xavier coach, accepted the job on April 6.

The conference set a new attendance record with 8,541 per game, beating the 2007 record of 8,524.

== Awards and honors ==
=== All-Americans ===
James Harden (SG, Sophomore), of Arizona State was named to the 2009 Consensus All-America first team. He was listed on the Associated Press, the USBWA, and the Sporting News All-American lists to qualify for the "Consensus All-America".

The following players from Pac-10 were honored on the AP All American list:

First Team (Player, School, Ht, Wt, Yr, Key stats)

- James Harden, Arizona State, 6–5, 218, So., 20.8 ppg, 5.5 rpg, 4.2 apg, 35.8 min., 50.2 fg pct (45, 290)

Honorable mention (Player, School)

- Jon Brockman, Washington
- Chase Budinger, Arizona
- Darren Collison, UCLA
- Jordan Hill, Arizona

=== All-Pac-10 teams ===
Regular season honors:

- Player of The Year: James Harden, Arizona State
- Freshman of The Year: Isaiah Thomas, Washington
- Defensive Player of The Year: Taj Gibson, USC
- Most Improved Player of The Year: Justin Dentmon, Washington
- Coach of The Year: Lorenzo Romar, Washington

First team

(Name, School, Pos, Yr, Ht, Wt, Hometown (Last School))

- Jon Brockman, WASH, F, Sr., 6–7, 255, Snohomish, Wash. (Snohomish HS)
- Chase Budinger, ARIZ, F, Jr., 6–7, 218, Encinitas, Calif. (LaCosta Canyon HS)
- Patrick Christopher, CAL, G, Jr., 6–5, 215, Compton, Calif. (Dominguez HS)
- Darren Collison, UCLA, G, Sr., 6–0, 160, Rancho Cucamonga, Calif. (Etiwanda HS)
- Justin Dentmon, WASH, G, Sr., 5–11, 185, Carbondale, Ill. (The Winchendon School, Mass.)
- James Harden, ASU, G, So., 6–5, 218, Los Angeles, Calif. (Artesia HS)
- Jordan Hill, ARIZ, F, Jr., 6–10, 235, Atlanta, Ga. (The Patterson School, N.C.)
- Jeff Pendergraph, ASU, F, Sr., 6–9, 240, Etiwanda, Calif. (Etiwanda HS)
- Jerome Randle, CAL, G, Jr., 5–10, 160, Chicago, Ill. (Hales Franciscan HS)
- Taylor Rochestie, WSU, G, Sr., 6–1, 186, Santa Barbara, Calif. (Tulane)

=== All-Academic ===
The 2008–09 Pacific-10 Conference Men's Basketball All-Academic teams (minimum 3.0 overall grade-point average and be either a starter or significant contributor):

First Team (School, Year, GPA, Major)

- Aron Baynes, WSU, Sr., 3.24, Movement Studies
- Derek Glasser, ASU, Jr., 3.14, Communications
- Daven Harmeling, WSU, Sr., 3.54, Health and Fitness Education
- Nikola Koprivica, WSU, Jr., 3.39, International Business
- Taylor Rochestie, WSU, Sr., 3.37, Communication

Second Team (School, Year, GPA, Major)

- Nikola Knezevic, CAL, Jr., 3.03, Interdisciplinary Studies
- Rihards Kuksiks, ASU, So., 3.07, Business Communications
- Roeland Schaftenaar, OSU, Jr., 3.17, Pre-Business
- Drew Shiller, STAN, Jr., 3.08, Communication
- Jordan Wilkes, CAL, Sr., 3.13, Social Welfare

Taylor Rochestie, of Washington State, was named a Pacific-10 Conference winter Scholar-Athletes of the Year.

=== USBWA All-District team ===
The U.S. Basketball Writers Association's 2008–09 Men's All-District Teams (District IX: CA, OR, WA, HI, AZ, AK):

- Player of the year – James Harden, Arizona State
- Coach of the year – Craig Robinson, Oregon State
- All-District Team:
  - James Harden, Arizona State
  - Jon Brockman, Washington
  - Darren Collison, UCLA
  - Patrick Christopher, California
  - Jordan Hill, Arizona
  - Jerome Randle, California
  - Chase Budinger, Arizona

== NBA draft ==
Round	Pick	Player	Position	Nationality	Team	School/club team
1	3	James Harden	SG	United States	Oklahoma City Thunder	Arizona State (So.)
1	8	Jordan Hill	PF	United States	New York Knicks	Arizona (Jr.)
1	9	Demar DeRozan	SG	United States	Toronto Raptors	USC (Fr.)
1	17	Jrue Holiday	PG	United States	Philadelphia 76ers	UCLA (Fr.)
1	21	Darren Collison	PG	United States	New Orleans Hornets	UCLA (Sr.)
1	26	Taj Gibson	PF	United States	Chicago Bulls (from Denver via Oklahoma City)	USC (Jr.)
2	31	Jeff Pendergraph	PF	United States	Sacramento Kings (traded to Portland)	Arizona State (Sr.)
2	38	Jon Brockman	PF	United States	Portland Trail Blazers (from New York via Chicago, traded to Sacramento)	Washington (Sr.)
2	44	Chase Budinger	SF	United States	Detroit Pistons (traded to Houston)	Arizona (Jr.)
