= 2008–09 Washington State Cougars men's basketball team =

American college basketball season

2008–09 Washington State Cougars men's basketball

NIT, First Round
- Conference: Pacific-10 Conference
- Record: 17–16 (8–10 Pac-10)
- Head coach: Tony Bennett (3rd season)
- Assistant coaches: Ben Johnson; Ron Sanchez; Matt Woodley; Mike Heideman
- Home arena: Beasley Coliseum

2008–09 Pacific-10 Conference men's basketball standings
	Conf.				Overall
Team	W		L	PCT	W		L	PCT
No. 15 Washington	14	–	4	.778	26	–	9	.743
No. 18 UCLA	13	–	5	.722	26	–	9	.743
No. 19 Arizona State	11	–	7	.611	25	–	10	.714
California	11	–	7	.611	22	–	11	.667
USC†	9	–	9	.500	22	–	13	.629
Arizona	9	–	9	.500	21	–	14	.600
Washington State	8	–	10	.444	17	–	16	.515
Oregon State	7	–	11	.389	18	–	18	.500
Stanford	6	–	12	.333	20	–	14	.588
Oregon	2	–	16	.111	8	–	23	.258
† Conference tournament winner Rankings from AP Poll

The 2008–09 Washington State Cougars men's basketball team represented Washington State University for the 2008–09 NCAA Division I men's basketball season. The team played their home games on Jack Friel Court in Beasley Coliseum in Pullman, Washington.

At the end of March 2009, Tony Bennett announced that he was leaving Washington State to take a head coaching job at Virginia. Ken Bone, formerly with Portland State, took over.

== Roster ==
Name	Number	Position	Height	Weight	Year	Hometown	Last high school/college
Marcus Capers	0	Guard	6–4	172	Freshman	Winter Haven, Florida	Montverde Acad.
Klay Thompson	1	Guard	6–6	187	Freshman	Ladera Ranch, California	Santa Margarita Catholic HS
Mike Harthun	3	Guard	6–3	170	Freshman	Medford, Oregon	South Medford HS
Nikola Koprivica	4	Guard	6–6	211	Junior	Belgrade, SER	Sport Grammar School
Abe Lodwick	5	Guard	6–7	196	RS freshman	Bend, Oregon	Mountain View HS
Taylor Rochestie	10	Guard	6–1	186	RS senior	Santa Barbara, California	Santa Barbara HS/Tulane
Aron Baynes	11	Center	6–10	270	Senior	Cairns, AUS	Cairns State HS
Fabian Boeke	13	Center	6–11	230	Sophomore	Hamburg, GER	Urspring Basketball Academy
James Watson	14	Forward	6–7	210	Freshman	Atoka, Oklahoma	Stringtown HS
John Allen	20	Guard	6–0	181	Freshman	Brier, Washington	Mountlake Terrace HS
DeAngelo Casto	23	Forward	6–8	229	Freshman	Spokane, Washington	Ferris HS
Daven Harmeling	32	Forward	6–7	225	RS senior	Grand Junction, Colorado	Fruita Monument HS
Charlie Enquist	40	Forward	6–10	220	RS freshman	Edmonds, Washington	King's HS
Nick Witherill	44	Guard	6–2	176	Freshman	Phoenix, Arizona	Highland HS
Caleb Forrest	52	Forward	6–8	228	Senior	Pagosa Springs, Colorado	Pagosa Springs HS

== Schedule ==
Date time, TV	Rank^{#}	Opponent^{#}	Result	Record	Site (attendance) city, state
Exhibition
11/10/2008*; 7:00 pm		Lewis–Clark State	W 76–31	–	Beasley Coliseum (5,091); Pullman, Washington
Regular season
11/15/2008*; 7:30 pm		Mississippi Valley State	W 76–25	1–0	Beasley Coliseum (8,346); Pullman, Washington
11/18/2008*; 7:00 pm		Fairleigh Dickinson; Legends Classic	W 55–33	2–0	Beasley Coliseum (6,159); Pullman, Washington
11/21/2008*; 6:00 pm		Sacramento State	W 76–55	3–0	Beasley Coliseum (8,054); Pullman, Washington
11/25/2008*; 7:00 pm		Canisius	W 67–41	4–0	Beasley Coliseum (6,091); Pullman, Washington
11/28/2008*; 2:30 pm, HDNet		vs. Mississippi State; Legends Classic semifinals	W 63–52	5–0	Prudential Center (N/A); Newark, New Jersey
11/29/2008*; 5:00 pm, HDNet		vs. No. 4 Pittsburgh; Legends Classic championship	L 43–57	5–1	Prudential Center (2,991); Newark, New Jersey
12/02/2008*; 7:00 pm, FSNNW		Idaho State	W 60–41	6–1	Beasley Coliseum (6,002); Pullman, Washington
12/06/2008*; 8:30 pm, FSN		No. 24 Baylor; Big 12/Pac-10 Hardwood Series	L 52–58	6–2	Beasley Coliseum (9,038); Pullman, Washington
12/10/2008*; 7:00 pm, FSNNW		No. 4 Gonzaga	L 52–74	6–3	Beasley Coliseum (10,894); Pullman, Washington
12/13/2008; 7:00 pm, FSNNW		vs. Montana State; Cougar Hardwood Classic	W 70–51	7–3	KeyArena (7,848); Seattle, Washington
12/21/2008*; 7:00 pm		at Idaho; Battle of the Palouse	W 55–41	8–3	Cowan Spectrum (1,618); Moscow, Idaho
12/27/2008*; 11:00 am, ESPN2		at LSU	L 52–64	8–4	Pete Maravich Assembly Center (10,585); Baton Rouge, Louisiana
01/03/2009; 3:00 pm, FSNNW		Washington	L 48–68	8–5 (0–1)	Beasley Coliseum (8,107); Pullman, Washington
01/08/2009; 8:00 pm		California	L 50–57	8–6 (0–2)	Beasley Coliseum (7,221); Pullman, Washington
01/10/2009; 7:00 pm, FSNNW		Stanford	W 55–54	9–6 (1–2)	Beasley Coliseum (7,332); Pullman, Washington
01/15/2009; 6:00 pm, FSN		at Oregon State	W 61–57 ^{OT}	10–6 (2–2)	Gill Coliseum (5,454); Corvallis, Oregon
01/17/2009; 11:00 am, FSN		at Oregon	W 74–62	11–6 (3–2)	McArthur Court (8,261); Eugene, Oregon
01/22/2009; 6:00 pm, FSN		No. 13 UCLA	L 59–61	11–7 (3–3)	Beasley Coliseum (8,434); Pullman, Washington
01/24/2009; 3:00 pm, FSNNW		USC	L 44–46	11–8 (3–4)	Beasley Coliseum (8,974); Pullman, Washington
01/29/2009; 7:30 pm		at No. 14 Arizona State	W 65–55	12–8 (4–4)	Wells Fargo Arena (10,745); Tempe, Arizona
01/31/2009; 10:00 am, CBS		at Arizona	L 56–66	12–9 (4–5)	McKale Center (13,476); Tucson, Arizona
02/05/2009; 7:30 pm		at Stanford	L 64–65	12–10 (4–6)	Maples Pavilion (6,887); Stanford, California
02/07/2009; 7:30 pm, FSN		at California	L 63–71	12–11 (4–7)	Haas Pavilion (9,197); Berkeley, California
02/12/2009; 7:00 pm		Oregon	W 67–38	13–11 (5–7)	Beasley Coliseum (7,068); Pullman, Washington
02/14/2009; 4:00 pm, FSNNW		Oregon State	L 52–54	13–12 (5–8)	Beasley Coliseum (7,452); Pullman, Washington
02/19/2009; 8:00 pm, FSN		at USC	W 61–51	13–13 (5–9)	Galen Center (6,352); Los Angeles, California
02/21/2009; 12:00 pm, FSN		at No. 15 UCLA	W 82–81	14–13 (6–9)	Pauley Pavilion (10,392); Los Angeles, California
02/26/2009; 6:00 pm, FSNNW		Arizona	W 69–53	15–13 (7–9)	Beasley Coliseum (7,957 ) Pullman, Washington
02/28/2009; 2:00 pm, FSNNW		No. 14 Arizona State	W 51–49 ^{OT}	16–13 (8–9)	Beasley Coliseum (10,712 ) Pullman, Washington
03/07/2009; 2:30 pm, FSN		at Washington	L 60-67	16–14 (8–10)	Bank of America Arena (10,000 ) Seattle, Washington
Pac-10 tournament
03/11/2009; 8:30 pm, FSN		vs. Oregon; First Round	W 62–40	17–14	Staples Center (10,964); Los Angeles, California
03/12/2009; 8:30 pm, FSN		vs. No. 14 UCLA; Quarterfinals	L 53–64	17–15	Staples Center (16,271); Los Angeles, California
National Invitation Tournament
03/17/2009*; 8:00 p.m., ESPN2		at Saint Mary's; First Round	L 57–68	17–16	McKeon Pavilion (2,107); Moraga, California
*Non-conference game. ^{#}Rankings from Coaches' Poll. (#) Tournament seedings in parentheses. All times are in Pacific Time.

== Notes ==
- Taylor Rochestie was named to the All-Pac-10 team; DeAngelo Casto and Klay Thompson were named to the All-Freshman team.
