= 2008–09 Arizona Wildcats men's basketball team =

American college basketball season

2008–09 Arizona Wildcats men's basketball

NCAA Tournament, Sweet Sixteen
- Conference: Pacific-10 Conference

Ranking
- Coaches: No. 24
- Record: 21–14 (9–9 Pac-10)
- Head coach: Russ Pennell (1st season)
- Home arena: McKale Center

2008–09 Pacific-10 Conference men's basketball standings
	Conf.				Overall
Team	W		L	PCT	W		L	PCT
No. 15 Washington	14	–	4	.778	26	–	9	.743
No. 18 UCLA	13	–	5	.722	26	–	9	.743
No. 19 Arizona State	11	–	7	.611	25	–	10	.714
California	11	–	7	.611	22	–	11	.667
USC†	9	–	9	.500	22	–	13	.629
Arizona	9	–	9	.500	21	–	14	.600
Washington State	8	–	10	.444	17	–	16	.515
Oregon State	7	–	11	.389	18	–	18	.500
Stanford	6	–	12	.333	20	–	14	.588
Oregon	2	–	16	.111	8	–	23	.258
† Conference tournament winner Rankings from AP Poll

The 2008–09 Arizona Wildcats men's basketball team represented the University of Arizona during the 2008–09 NCAA Division I men's basketball season. The Wildcats, led by first year head coach Russ Pennell, played their home games at the McKale Center and are members of the Pacific-10 Conference.

== Recruiting class ==
College recruiting information
Name	Hometown	School	Height	Weight	Commit date
Kyle Fogg; SG	Brea, California	Brea Olinda High School	6 ft 3 in (1.91 m)	180 lb (82 kg)	May 19, 2008
Kyle Fogg; SG	Recruit ratings: Scout: Rivals: (85)				
Garland Judkins; SG	Humble, Texas	Christian Life Center Academy	6 ft 3 in (1.91 m)	200 lb (91 kg)	Jul 31, 2008
Garland Judkins; SG	Recruit ratings: Scout: Rivals: (50)				
Brendon Lavender; PG	Mesa, Arizona	Mountain View High School	6 ft 5 in (1.96 m)	215 lb (98 kg)	May 4, 2007
Brendon Lavender; PG	Recruit ratings: Scout: Rivals: (91)				
Jeff Withey; C	San Diego, California	Horizon High School	6 ft 10 in (2.08 m)	210 lb (95 kg)	Jun 25, 2007
Jeff Withey; C	Recruit ratings: Scout: Rivals: (96)				
Overall recruit ranking: Scout: 11 Rivals: NR ESPN: 9
Note: In many cases, Scout, Rivals, 247Sports, On3, and ESPN may conflict in their listings of height and weight.; In these cases, the average was taken. ESPN grades are on a 100-point scale.; Sources: "ESPN". ESPN.; "2008 Team Ranking". Rivals.

== Roster ==
2008–09 Arizona Wildcats men's basketball team
Players
Coaches

Pos.	#	Name	Height	Weight	Year	Hometown
F	2	Zane Johnson	6 ft 5 in (1.96 m)	204 lb (93 kg)	So	Phoenix, Arizona
G	4	Garland Judkins	6 ft 3 in (1.91 m)	195 lb (88 kg)	Fr	Wolfeboro, New Hampshire
G	11	David Bagga	6 ft 4 in (1.93 m)	180 lb (82 kg)	Sr	Santa Ana, California
G	13	Nic Wise	5 ft 10 in (1.78 m)	177 lb (80 kg)	Jr	Kingwood, Texas
G	14	Brendon Lavender	6 ft 3 in (1.91 m)	205 lb (93 kg)	Fr	Mesa, Arizona
G	21	Kyle Fogg	6 ft 2 in (1.88 m)	175 lb (79 kg)	Fr	Brea, California
F	24	Fendi Onobun	6 ft 6 in (1.98 m)	249 lb (113 kg)	Sr	Houston, Texas
F	33	D. J. Shumpert	6 ft 6 in (1.98 m)	180 lb (82 kg)	Fr	Tucson, Arizona
F	34	Chase Budinger	6 ft 7 in (2.01 m)	218 lb (99 kg)	Jr	Encinitas, California
F	42	Jamelle Horne	6 ft 6 in (1.98 m)	209 lb (95 kg)	So	San Diego, California
F	43	Jordan Hill	6 ft 10 in (2.08 m)	235 lb (107 kg)	Jr	Patterson, North Carolina
C	50	Alex Jacobson	6 ft 11 in (2.11 m)	253 lb (115 kg)	RS Fr	Santa Ana, California

Head coach

- Russ Pennell (Pittsburg State)

Assistant coach(es)

- Mike Dunlap (Loyola Marymount)
- Reggie Geary (Arizona)

Legend

- (C) Team captain
- (S) Suspended
- (I) Ineligible
- (W) Walk-on
- Injured
- Current redshirt

Roster
Last update: July 5, 2011

=== Depth chart ===
Pos.	Starting 5	Bench 1	Bench 2
C	Jordan Hill	Alex Jacobson
PF	Jamelle Horne	Fendi Onobun
SF	Chase Budinger	Zane Johnson	D.J. Shumpert
SG	Kyle Fogg	Brendon Lavender	David Bagga
PG	Nic Wise		Garland Judkins

== Schedule ==
Date time, TV	Rank^{#}	Opponent^{#}	Result	Record	Site (attendance) city, state
Exhibition
November 6, 2008*; 7:00 pm, FSAZ		Incarnate Word	W 97–83	–	McKale Center (12,447); Tucson, AZ
November 12, 2008*; 7:00 pm		Sonoma State	W 78–64	–	McKale Center (13,963); Tucson, AZ
Regular season
November 17, 2008*; 9:00 pm, ESPNU		Florida Atlantic; NIT Season Tip-Off First Round	W 75–62	1–0	McKale Center (13,006); Tucson, AZ
November 18, 2008*; 9:30 pm, ESPN2		UAB; NIT Season Tip-Off Quarterfinals	L 71–72	1–1	McKale Center (13,124); Tucson, AZ
November 24, 2008*; 3:45 pm		vs. Mississippi Valley State; NIT Season Tip-Off Consolation Game	W 86–52	2–1	Stegeman Coliseum (NA); Athens, GA
November 25, 2008*; 3:45 pm		vs. Santa Clara; NIT Season Tip-Off Consolation Game	W 69–66	3–1	Stegeman Coliseum (4,207); Athens, GA
November 30, 2008*; 2:00 pm, FSAZ		Northern Arizona	W 74–57	4–1	McKale Center (12,204); Tucson, AZ
December 2, 2008*; 7:00 pm, FSAZ		Loyola Marymount	W 84–57	5–1	McKale Center (12,339); Tucson, AZ
December 5, 2008*; 7:30 pm, ESPNU		at Texas A&M; Big 12/Pac-10 Hardwood Series	L 66–67	5–2	Reed Arena (10,393); College Station, TX
December 10, 2008*; 7:00 pm, FSAZ		San Diego State	W 69–56	6–2	McKale Center (13,156); Tucson, AZ
December 14, 2008*; 4:00 pm, FSN		No. 4 Gonzaga	W 69–64	7–2	US Airways Center (6,207); Phoenix, AZ
December 20, 2008*; 1:00 pm, Versus		at UNLV	L 64–79	7–3	Thomas & Mack Center (16,667); Paradise, NV
December 23, 2008*; 8:30 pm, FSN		Kansas; Fiesta Bowl Classic	W 84–67	8–3	McKale Center (14,156); Tucson, AZ
December 29, 2008*; 6:30 pm, FSAZ		Weber State	W 71–65	9–3	McKale Center (13,492); Tucson, AZ
January 2, 2009; 6:30 pm, FSAZ		at California	L 55–69	9–4 (0–1)	Haas Pavilion (8,640); Berkeley, CA
January 4, 2009; 8:00 pm, FSN		at Stanford	L 60–76	9–5 (0–2)	Maples Pavilion (7,198); Stanford, CA
January 8, 2009; 6:30 pm, FSAZ		Oregon	W 67–52	10–5 (1–2)	McKale Center (12,812); Tucson, AZ
January 10, 2009; 2:00 pm, FSAZ		Oregon State	W 64–47	11–5 (2–2)	McKale Center (13,144); Tucson, AZ
January 15, 2009; 9:00 pm, FSN		at No. 7 UCLA	L 60–83	11–6 (2–3)	Pauley Pavilion (11,228); Los Angeles, CA
January 17, 2009; 6:00 pm, FSAZ		at USC	L 64–65	11–7 (2–4)	Galen Center (5,356); Los Angeles, CA
January 21, 2009; 7:30 pm, FSAZ		No. 17 Arizona State	L 47–53	11–8 (2–5)	McKale Center (14,640); Tucson, AZ
January 24, 2009*; 4:00 pm, FSAZ		Houston	W 96–90 ^{OT}	12–8	McKale Center (13,802); Tucson, AZ
January 29, 2009; 6:30 pm		No. 23 Washington	W 106–97	13–8 (3–5)	McKale Center (14,434); Tucson, AZ
January 31, 2009; 11:00 am, CBS		Washington State	W 66–56	14–8 (4–5)	McKale Center (13,476); Tucson, AZ
February 5, 2009; 6:30 pm, FSAZ		at Oregon State	W 56–53	15–8 (5–5)	Gill Coliseum (6,537); Corvallis, OR
February 7, 2009; 1:30 pm, ABC		at Oregon	W 87–77	16–8 (6–5)	McArthur Court (8,012); Eugene, OR
February 12, 2009; 8:30 pm, FSN		USC	W 83–76	17–8 (7–5)	McKale Center (14,728); Tucson, AZ
February 14, 2009; 11:00 am, CBS		No. 6 UCLA	W 84–72	18–8 (8–5)	McKale Center (14,611); Tucson, AZ
February 22, 2009; 8:00 pm, FSN		at No. 14 Arizona State	L 68–70	18–9 (8–6)	Wells Fargo Arena (14,123); Tempe, AZ
February 26, 2009; 7:00 pm, FSAZ		at Washington State	L 53–69	18–10 (8–7)	Beasley Coliseum (7,957); Pullman, WA
February 28, 2009; 1:00 pm, FSN		at No. 21 Washington	L 78–87	18–11 (8–8)	Bank of America Arena (10,000); Seattle, WA
March 5, 2009; 8:30 pm, FSN		California	L 77–83	18–12 (8–9)	McKale Center (14,729); Tucson, AZ
March 7, 2009; 5:30 pm, FSAZ		Stanford	W 101–87	19–12 (9–9)	McKale Center (14,723); Tucson, AZ
Pac-10 Tournament
March 12, 2009; 1:00 pm		vs. No. 23 Arizona State; Quarterfinals	L 56–68	19–13	Staples Center (NA); Los Angeles, CA
NCAA tournament
March 20, 2009*; 4:10 pm		vs. No. 25 Utah; First Round	W 84–71	20–13	American Airlines Arena (8,990); Miami, FL
March 22, 2009*; 11:40 am		vs. Cleveland State; Second Round	W 71–57	21–13	American Airlines Arena (10,204); Miami, FL
March 27, 2009*; 4:07 pm		vs. No. 1 Louisville; Sweet Sixteen	L 64–103	21–14	Lucas Oil Stadium (33,780); Indianapolis, IN
*Non-conference game. ^{#}Rankings from AP Poll. (#) Tournament seedings in parentheses. All times are in Mountain Time.

== Awards ==
Chase Budinger

- Pac-10 All-Conference First Team
- Pac-10 Player of the Week – February 2, 2009

Jordan Hill

- Pac-10 All-Conference First Team
- Pac-10 Player of the Week – December 15, 2008

Nic Wise

- Pac-10 All-Conference Second Team
- Pac-10 Player of the Week – February 16, 2009

Jamelle Horne

- Pac-10 Player of the Week – December 29, 2008
