= 2008–09 Oregon State Beavers men's basketball team =

American college basketball season

2008–09 Oregon State Beavers men's basketball

CBI Champions
- Conference: Pacific-10 Conference
- Record: 18–18 (7–11 Pac-10)
- Head coach: Craig Robinson (1st season)
- Assistant coaches: Doug Stewart (1st season); Nate Pomeday (1st season); David Grace (1st season)
- Home arena: Gill Coliseum

2008–09 Pacific-10 Conference men's basketball standings
| | Conf. | | | | Overall |
| Team | W | | L | PCT | W | | L | PCT |
|---|---|---|---|---|---|---|---|---|
| No. 15 Washington | 14 | – | 4 | .778 | 26 | – | 9 | .743 |
| No. 18 UCLA | 13 | – | 5 | .722 | 26 | – | 9 | .743 |
| No. 19 Arizona State | 11 | – | 7 | .611 | 25 | – | 10 | .714 |
| California | 11 | – | 7 | .611 | 22 | – | 11 | .667 |
| USC† | 9 | – | 9 | .500 | 22 | – | 13 | .629 |
| Arizona | 9 | – | 9 | .500 | 21 | – | 14 | .600 |
| Washington State | 8 | – | 10 | .444 | 17 | – | 16 | .515 |
| Oregon State | 7 | – | 11 | .389 | 18 | – | 18 | .500 |
| Stanford | 6 | – | 12 | .333 | 20 | – | 14 | .588 |
| Oregon | 2 | – | 16 | .111 | 8 | – | 23 | .258 |
† Conference tournament winner Rankings from AP Poll

The 2008–09 Oregon State Beavers men's basketball team represented Oregon State University in National Collegiate Athletic Association (NCAA) Division I men's basketball during the 2008–09 season. Playing in the Pacific-10 Conference (Pac-10) and led by first-year head coach Craig Robinson, the Beavers finished the season with a 18–18 overall record and won the 2009 College Basketball Invitational. It was Oregon State's first-ever postseason tournament championship. Their 12-win improvement over the previous season was the third-highest turnaround in Division I in 2008–09.

In Pac-10 play, the Beavers finished in eighth place with a 7–11 record. They lost in the first round of the 2009 Pac-10 tournament to Stanford, 62–54.

== Roster ==
2008–09 Oregon State Beavers men's basketball team
Players
Coaches

| Pos. | # | Name | Height | Weight | Year | Previous school | Hometown |
|---|---|---|---|---|---|---|---|
| F | 0 | Kevin McShane | 6 ft 9 in (2.06 m) | 215 lb (98 kg) | RS Fr | Clackamas CC | Portland, Oregon |
| G | 1 | Kyle Bjornstad | 5 ft 10 in (1.78 m) | 175 lb (79 kg) | Sr | Northwest Christian | Eugene, Oregon |
| F | 2 | Calvin Hampton | 6 ft 10 in (2.08 m) | 250 lb (113 kg) | RS Jr | New Hampton School | Fort Washington, Maryland |
| G | 3 | Chris Richard | 6 ft 3 in (1.91 m) | 190 lb (86 kg) | RS Fr | Richmond | Portland, Oregon |
| F | 4 | David Sturner | 6 ft 8 in (2.03 m) | 205 lb (93 kg) | Fr | Philomath HS | Philomath, Oregon |
| G | 5 | Josh Tarver | 6 ft 3 in (1.91 m) | 190 lb (86 kg) | Jr | Jesuit HS | Portland, Oregon |
| F/C | 10 | Roeland Schaftenaar | 6 ft 11 in (2.11 m) | 240 lb (109 kg) | Jr | Gerrit Rietveld College | Utrecht, Netherlands |
| G | 11 | Rickey Claitt | 6 ft 2 in (1.88 m) | 175 lb (79 kg) | Sr | Mineral Area JC | Orlando, Florida |
| G | 12 | Joey McConnell | 6 ft 4 in (1.93 m) | 200 lb (91 kg) | Sr | Madras HS | Madras, Oregon |
| G/F | 15 | Seth Tarver | 6 ft 5 in (1.96 m) | 210 lb (95 kg) | Jr | Jesuit HS | Portland, Oregon |
| G | 22 | Calvin Haynes | 6 ft 2 in (1.88 m) | 185 lb (84 kg) | So | South Kent School | Reseda, California |
| F | 24 | Omari Johnson | 6 ft 9 in (2.06 m) | 215 lb (98 kg) | So | Susan Miller Dorsey HS | Los Angeles, California |
| F | 30 | Daniel Deane | 6 ft 8 in (2.03 m) | 245 lb (111 kg) | So | Utah | Park City, Utah |
| G | 34 | Lathen Wallace | 6 ft 3 in (1.91 m) | 200 lb (91 kg) | So | Jefferson HS | Portland, Oregon |

Head coach

- Craig Robinson (Princeton '83)

Assistant coach(es)

- Doug Stewart (Brown '94)
- Nate Pomeday (Northwestern '99)
- David Grace (Park '03)

Legend

- (C) Team captain
- (S) Suspended
- (I) Ineligible
- (W) Walk-on
- Injured
- Current redshirt

Roster
Last update: 9–8–2019

== Schedule and results ==
Sources:

== Schedule ==
| Date time, TV | Rank^{#} | Opponent^{#} | Result | Record | Site (attendance) city, state |
Exhibition
| 11/02/2009*; 5:30 pm | | St. Martin's | W 80–76 | 1—0 | Gill Coliseum (2,937); Corvallis, OR |
| 11/08/2009*; 7:00 pm | | Concordia | W 82–57 | 2—0 | Gill Coliseum (2,619); Corvallis, OR |
Regular season
| 11/14/2008*; 4:00 pm | | at Howard | L 45–47 | 0–1 | Burr Gymnasium (1,752); Washington D.C. |
| 11/22/2008*; 7:00 pm | | at Nevada | L 71–79 | 0–2 | Lawlor Events Center (7,629); Reno, NV |
| 11/24/2008*; 7:00 pm | | Yale | L 52–53 | 0–3 | Gill Coliseum (3,413); Corvallis, OR |
| 11/26/2008*; 8:00 pm | | Montana State | L 79–82 | 0–4 | Gill Coliseum (3,109); Corvallis, OR |
| 11/30/2009*; 2:00 pm | | at Fresno State | W 62–54 | 1–4 | Save Mart Center (8,548); Fresno, CA |
| 12/6/2008*; 11:00 am, ESPNU | | at Iowa State; Big 12/Pac-10 Hardwood Series | L 50–63 | 1–5 | Hilton Coliseum (13,668); Ames, IA |
| 12/13/2008*; 5:00 pm, FSNNW, FSN Midwest | | Nebraska | W 64–63 | 2–5 | Gill Coliseum (3,359); Corvallis, OR |
| 12/16/2008*; 7:00 pm | | Seattle Pacific | W 71–67 | 3–5 | Gill Coliseum (2,619); Corvallis, OR |
| 12/20/2008*; 7:00 pm | | Howard | W 90–54 | 4–5 | Gill Coliseum (2,859); Corvallis, OR |
| 12/29/2008*; 7:00 pm, FSNNW | | Seattle | W 59–50 | 5–5 | Gill Coliseum (3,109); Corvallis, OR |
| 01/02/2009; 7:30 pm, FSN | | UCLA | L 46–69 | 5–6 (0–1) | Gill Coliseum (5,629); Corvallis, OR |
| 01/04/2009; 2:30 pm, FSN West | | USC | W 62–58 ^{OT} | 6–6 (1–1) | Gill Coliseum (4,719); Corvallis, OR |
| 01/08/2009; 7:30 pm, FSN | | at Arizona State | L 38–69 | 6–7 (1–2) | Wells Fargo Arena (7,004); Tempe, AZ |
| 01/10/2009; 1:00 pm, FS Arizona | | at Arizona | L 47–64 | 6–8 (1–3) | McKale Center (13,144); Tucson, AZ |
| 01/15/2009*; 6:00 pm, FSN | | Washington State | L 57–61 ^{OT} | 6–9 (1–4) | Gill Coliseum (5,454); Corvallis, OR |
| 01/17/2009; 7:00 pm, FSNNW | | Washington | L 59–85 | 6–10 (1–5) | Gill Coliseum (6,648); Corvallis, OR |
| 01/22/2009; 7:30 pm | | at California | W 69–65 | 7–10 (2–5) | Haas Pavilion (8,236); Berkeley, CA |
| 01/24/2009; 7:00 pm, FSNNW, CSN BA | | at Stanford | W 77–62 | 8–10 (3–5) | Maples Pavilion (7,329); Stanford, CA |
| 01/26/2009*; 7:00 pm | | Cal State Bakersfield | W 65–59 | 9–10 (3–5) | Gill Coliseum (5,229); Corvallis, OR |
| 01/31/2009; 4:30 pm, FSNNW | | Oregon; Civil War | W 57–54 | 10–10 (4–5) | Gill Coliseum (10,129); Corvallis, OR |
| 02/05/2009; 5:30 pm, FSNNW | | Arizona | L 53–56 | 10–11 (4–6) | Gill Coliseum (6,537); Corvallis, OR |
| 02/07/2009; 5:30 pm, FSNNW/ FS AZ | | Arizona State | L 38–49 | 10–12 (4–7) | Gill Coliseum (7,449); Corvallis, OR |
| 02/12/2009; 8:00 pm, FSNNW | | Washington | L 60–79 | 10–13 (4–8) | Bank of America Arena (10,000); Seattle, WA |
| 02/14/2009; 4:00 pm, FSNNW | | at Washington State | W 54–52 | 11–13 (5–8) | Beasley Coliseum (7,452); Pullman, WA |
| 02/19/2009; 7:00 pm | | Stanford | W 66–54 | 12–13 (6–8) | Gill Coliseum (6,229); Corvallis, OR |
| 02/21/2009; 2:00 pm, FSNNW | | California | W 65–54 | 13–13 (7–8) | Gill Coliseum (7,619); Corvallis, OR |
| 03/01/2009; 7:00 pm, FSN | | at Oregon; Civil War | L 69–79 | 13–14 (7–9) | McArthur Court (8,769); Eugene, OR |
| 03/05/2009; 5:00 pm, FSN/FSN Prime Ticket | | at UCLA | L 54–69 | 13–15 (7–10) | Pauley Pavilion (10,348); Los Angeles, CA |
| 03/07/2009; 5:00 pm, FSN | | at USC | L 52–68 | 13–16 (7–11) | Galen Center (6,603); Los Angeles, CA |
Pac-10 tournament
| 03/11/10; 7:40 pm, FSN | (8) | vs. (9) Stanford; First Round | L 52–59 | 13–17 | Staples Center (10,964); Los Angeles, CA |
CBI
| 03/18/2009; 7:00 pm, HDNet | | Houston; First Round | W 49–45 | 14–17 | Gill Coliseum (3,511); Corvallis, OR |
| 03/23/2009; 7:00 pm, HDNet | | Vermont; Quarterfinals | W 71–70 | 15–17 | Gill Coliseum (4,053); Corvallis, OR |
| 03/25/2009; 7:00 pm, HDNet | | Stanford; Semifinals | W 65–62 | 16–17 | Gill Coliseum (4,759); Corvallis, OR |
| 03/30/2009; 7:00 pm, HDNet | | UTEP; Finals, Game 1 | W 75–69 | 17–17 | Gill Coliseum (8,029); Corvallis, OR |
| 04/01/2009; 7:00 pm, HDNet | | at UTEP; Finals, Game 2 | L 63–70 | 17–18 | Don Haskins Center (12,000); El Paso, TX |
| 02/19/2009; 7:00 pm, HDNet | | at UTEP; Finals, Game 3 | W 81–73 | 18–18 | Don Haskins Center (12,000); El Paso, TX |
*Non-conference game. ^{#}Rankings from AP Poll. (#) Tournament seedings in parentheses. All times are in Pacific Time.
