= 2008–09 USC Trojans men's basketball team =

American college basketball season

2008–09 USC Trojans men's basketball

Pac-10 tournament champions

NCAA tournament, Second round
- Conference: Pacific-10 Conference
- Record: 22–13 (9–9 Pac-10)
- Head coach: Tim Floyd
- Assistant coaches: Gib Arnold; Bob Cantu; Phil L. Johnson
- Home arena: Galen Center

2008–09 Pacific-10 Conference men's basketball standings
	Conf.				Overall
Team	W		L	PCT	W		L	PCT
No. 15 Washington	14	–	4	.778	26	–	9	.743
No. 18 UCLA	13	–	5	.722	26	–	9	.743
No. 19 Arizona State	11	–	7	.611	25	–	10	.714
California	11	–	7	.611	22	–	11	.667
USC†	9	–	9	.500	22	–	13	.629
Arizona	9	–	9	.500	21	–	14	.600
Washington State	8	–	10	.444	17	–	16	.515
Oregon State	7	–	11	.389	18	–	18	.500
Stanford	6	–	12	.333	20	–	14	.588
Oregon	2	–	16	.111	8	–	23	.258
† Conference tournament winner Rankings from AP Poll

The 2008–09 USC Trojans men's basketball team represented the University of Southern California during the 2008-09 NCAA Division I men's basketball season. The Trojans, led by 4th year head coach Tim Floyd, played their home games at the Galen Center and were members of the Pacific-10 Conference. They finished the season 22–13, 9–9 in Pac-10 play. They won the 2009 Pacific-10 Conference men's basketball tournament over Arizona State. They went to the 2009 NCAA Division I men's basketball tournament as a 10th seed, where they lost in the 2nd round to Michigan State.

== Class of 2008 ==
College recruiting
Name	Hometown	School	Height	Weight	Commit date
DeMar DeRozan; SF	Compton, CA	Compton HS	6 ft 6 in (1.98 m)	180 lb (82 kg)	Feb 6, 2007
DeMar DeRozan; SF	Recruit ratings: Scout: Rivals: (96)				
Percy Miller; PG	Beverly Hills, CA	Beverly Hills HS	6 ft 0 in (1.83 m)	160 lb (73 kg)	Apr 13, 2007
Percy Miller; PG	Recruit ratings: Scout: Rivals: (40)				
Donte Smith; PG	Walnut, CA	Mount San Antonio CC	6 ft 0 in (1.83 m)	180 lb (82 kg)	Sep 1, 2007
Donte Smith; PG	Recruit ratings: Scout: Rivals: (40)				
Nikola Vucevic; PF	Simi Valley, CA	Stone Ridge Prep	6 ft 10 in (2.08 m)	230 lb (100 kg)	Jun 8, 2008
Nikola Vucevic; PF	Recruit ratings: Scout: Rivals: (40)				
Leonard Washington; SF	Compton, CA	Marshall HS	6 ft 6 in (1.98 m)	220 lb (100 kg)	Jun 17, 2008
Leonard Washington; SF	Recruit ratings: Scout: Rivals: (80)				
Overall Recruiting Rankings: Scout – 26 Rivals – 20 ESPN – UR

== Roster ==
Number	Name	Height	Position	Class
43	Kasey Cunningham	6–7	F	SO
10	DeMar DeRozan	6–7	F	FR
14	Mamadou Diarra	7-0	F	FR
3	James Dueavy	6–6	G	FR
22	Taj Gibson	6–9	F	JR
30	Terence Green	5-11	G	SR
13	Daniel Hackett	6–5	G	JR
0	Marcus Johnson	6–6	F	SR
21	Dwight Lewis	6–5	G	JR
34	J.J. Meyers	6–2	G	JR
15	Percy Miller	5–11	G	FR
20	Marcus Simmons	6–6	G	SO
35	Donte Smith	5–11	G	SO
1	Alex Stepheson	6–9	F	JR
5	Nikola Vucevic	6–10	F	FR
4	Leonard Washington	6–7	F	FR
2	Ryan Wetherell	5–11	G	JR
23	Keith Wilkinson	6–10	F	SR
17	Rashad Cooper	6-3	G	SO

=== Schedule ===
Date time, TV	Rank^{#}	Opponent^{#}	Result	Record	Site city, state
Regular season
November 15, 2008*	No. 21	UC Irvine	W 78–55	1–0	Galen Center; Los Angeles, CA
November 18, 2008*	No. 20	New Mexico State	W 73–60	2–0	Galen Center; Los Angeles, CA
November 20, 2008*; ESPNU	No. 20	vs. Seton Hall; Puerto Rico Tip-Off	L 61–63	2–1	Coliseo de Puerto Rico; San Juan, Puerto Rico
November 21, 2008*; ESPNU	No. 20	vs. Chattanooga; Puerto Rico Tip-Off	W 73–46	3–1	Coliseo de Puerto Rico; San Juan, Puerto Rico
November 23, 2008*; ESPNU	No. 20	vs. Missouri; Puerto Rico Tip-Off	L 72–83	3–2	Coliseo de Puerto Rico; San Juan, Puerto Rico
November 28, 2008*		UT Martin	W 70–43	4–2	Galen Center; Los Angeles, CA
December 1, 2008*		San Francisco	W 74–69	5–2	Galen Center; Los Angeles, CA
December 4, 2008*; ESPN2		at No. 6 Oklahoma; Big 12/Pac-10 Hardwood Series	L 72–73	5–3	Lloyd Noble Center; Norman, OK
December 15, 2008*		Pepperdine	W 91–77	6–3	Galen Center; Los Angeles, CA
December 20, 2008*		North Dakota State	W 71–67	7–3	Galen Center; Los Angeles, CA
December 22, 2008*; FSN		Georgia Tech	W 76–57	8–3	Galen Center; Los Angeles, CA
December 28, 2008*		Oral Roberts	W 66–56	9–3	Galen Center; Los Angeles, CA
January 2, 2009		at Oregon	W 83–62	10–3 (1–0)	McArthur Court; Eugene, OR
January 4, 2009; FS West		at Oregon State	L 58–62 ^{OT}	10–4 (1–1)	Gill Coliseum; Corvallis, OR
January 11, 2009; FSN		No. 7 UCLA	L 60–64	10–5 (1–2)	Galen Center; Los Angeles, CA
January 15, 2009		No. 15 Arizona State	W 61–49	11–5 (2–2)	Galen Center; Los Angeles, CA
January 17, 2009; Prime Ticket		Arizona	W 65–64	12–5 (3–2)	Galen Center; Los Angeles, CA
January 22, 2009; FSN		at Washington	L 73–78	12–6 (3–3)	Hec Edmundson Pavilion; Seattle, WA
January 24, 2009; FS West		at Washington State	W 46–44	13–6 (4–3)	Beasley Coliseum; Pullman, WA
January 29, 2009; Prime Ticket		Stanford	W 70–69	14–6 (5–3)	Galen Center; Los Angeles, CA
January 31, 2009; FSN		California	W 73–62	15–6 (6–3)	Galen Center; Los Angeles, CA
February 4, 2009; Prime Ticket		at No. 12 UCLA	L 60–76	15–7 (6–4)	Pauley Pavilion; Los Angeles, CA
February 12, 2009; FSN		at Arizona	L 76–83	15–8 (6–5)	McKale Center; Tucson, AZ
February 15, 2009; FSN		at No. 18 Arizona State	L 53–65	15–9 (6–6)	Wells Fargo Arena; Tempe, AZ
February 19, 2009; Prime Ticket		Washington State	W 61–51	16–9 (7–6)	Galen Center; Los Angeles, CA
February 21, 2009; Prime Ticket		No. 19 Washington	L 51–60	16–10 (7–7)	Galen Center; Los Angeles, CA
February 26, 2009		at California	L 78–81	16–11 (7–8)	Haas Pavilion; Berkeley, CA
February 28, 2009		at Stanford	L 63–75	16–12 (7–9)	Maples Pavilion; Stanford, CA
March 5, 2009		Oregon	W 80–66	17–12 (8–9)	Galen Center; Los Angeles, CA
March 7, 2009		Oregon State	W 68–52	18–12 (9–9)	Galen Center; Los Angeles, CA
Pac-10 Conference tournament
March 12, 2009; FSN	(6)	vs. (3) California; Pac-10 Quarterfinals	W 79–75	19–12	Staples Center; Los Angeles, CA
March 13, 2009; FSN	(6)	vs. (2) No. 14 UCLA; Pac-10 Semifinals	W 65–55	20–12	Staples Center; Los Angeles, CA
March 14, 2009; CBS	(6)	vs. (4) No. 23 Arizona State; Pac-10 Championship	W 66–63	21–12	Staples Center; Los Angeles, CA
NCAA tournament
March 20, 2009; CBS	(10 MW)	vs. (7 MW) Boston College; NCAA First Round	W 69–55	22–12	Hubert H. Humphrey Metrodome; Minneapolis, MN
March 22, 2009; CBS	(10 MW)	vs. (2 MW) Michigan State; NCAA Second Round	L 69–74	22–13	Hubert H. Humphrey Metrodome; Minneapolis, MN
*Non-conference game. ^{#}Rankings from USA Today Coaches Poll. (#) Tournament seedings in parentheses.
