= 2008–09 Arizona State Sun Devils men's basketball team =

American college basketball season

2008–09 Arizona State Sun Devils men's basketball

NCAA tournament, second round
- Conference: Pacific-10 Conference

Ranking
- Coaches: No. 19
- AP: No. 19
- Record: 25–10 (11–7 Pac-10)
- Head coach: Herb Sendek
- Assistant coaches: Dedrique Taylor; Scott Pera; Lamont Smith
- Home arena: Wells Fargo Arena

2008–09 Pacific-10 Conference men's basketball standings
	Conf.				Overall
Team	W		L	PCT	W		L	PCT
No. 15 Washington	14	–	4	.778	26	–	9	.743
No. 18 UCLA	13	–	5	.722	26	–	9	.743
No. 19 Arizona State	11	–	7	.611	25	–	10	.714
California	11	–	7	.611	22	–	11	.667
USC†	9	–	9	.500	22	–	13	.629
Arizona	9	–	9	.500	21	–	14	.600
Washington State	8	–	10	.444	17	–	16	.515
Oregon State	7	–	11	.389	18	–	18	.500
Stanford	6	–	12	.333	20	–	14	.588
Oregon	2	–	16	.111	8	–	23	.258
† Conference tournament winner Rankings from AP Poll

The 2008–09 Arizona State Sun Devils men's basketball team represented Arizona State University during the 2008–09 NCAA Division I men's basketball season. The Sun Devils played their home games at the Wells Fargo Arena and are members of the Pacific-10 Conference. The Sun Devils finished with 25–10, 11–7 in Pac-10 play and lost the championship game of the 2009 Pacific-10 Conference men's basketball tournament to USC. They earned a trip to the 2009 NCAA Division I men's basketball tournament, where they lost to Syracuse in the second round.

== Roster ==
Number	Name	Position	Height	Weight	Year	Hometown	High School/Last College
2	Eric Boateng	Center	6–10	245	Senior	London, England	Duke University
3	Ty Abbott	Guard	6–3	205	Junior	Phoenix, AZ	Desert Vista High School
4	Jeff Pendergraph	Forward	6–9	240	Senior	Etiwanda, CA	Etiwanda HS
10	Jamelle McMillan	Guard	6–2	180	Junior	Seattle, WA	O'Dea HS
12	Derek Glasser	Guard	6–1	190	Senior	Marina Del Rey, CA	Artesia HS
13	James Harden	Guard	6–5	218	Sophomore	Los Angeles, CA	Artesia HS
15	Chanse Creekmur	Guard/Forward	6–5	216	Freshman	Marshalltown, IA	Marshalltown HS
21	Keala King	Guard	6–4	201	Freshman	Compton, CA	Mater Dei HS
22	Kraidon Woods	Forward	6–8	199	Junior	Henryville, PA	The Hill School
23	Nico Fricchione	Guard	6–1	175	Freshman	Scranton, PA	Holy Cross High School
30	Rihards Kuksiks	Guard/Forward	6–6	206	Junior	Riga, Latvia	Florida Air Academy
32	Taylor Rohde	Forward/Center	6–8	220	Sophomore	Phoenix, AZ	Pinnacle HS
40	Stephen Rogers	Forward	6–8	185	RS Freshman	Mesa, AZ	Mountain View HS
44	Jerren Shipp	Guard	6–3	220	Senior	Los Angeles, CA	Fairfax HS

== Schedule ==
Date time, TV	Rank^{#}	Opponent^{#}	Result	Record	Site (attendance) city, state
Non-conference regular season
11/14/2008*; 8:00 pm, FSAZ	No. 15	Mississippi Valley State	W 80–64	1–0	Wells Fargo Arena (8,590); Tempe, AZ
11/18/2008*; 9:00 pm, CBSCS	No. 15	at San Diego State	W 59–52	2–0	Cox Arena (7,966); San Diego, CA
11/23/2008*; 2:00 pm, FSAZ	No. 15	Pepperdine	W 61–40	3–0	Wells Fargo Arena (8,045); Tempe, AZ
11/27/2008*; 7:00 pm, ESPNU	No. 14	vs. Charlotte; 76 Classic Quarterfinals	W 84–56	4–0	Anaheim Convention Center (N/A); Anaheim, CA
11/27/2008*; 10:30 pm, ESPN2	No. 14	vs. Baylor; 76 Classic Semifinals	L 78–87	4–1	Anaheim Convention Center (1,417); Anaheim, CA
11/30/2008*; 6:00 pm, ESPNU	No. 14	vs. UTEP; 76 Classic 3rd place game	W 88–58	5–1	Anaheim Convention Center (N/A); Anaheim, CA
12/02/2008*; 5:00 pm	No. 19	Jackson State	W 81–60	6–1	Wells Fargo Arena (7,640); Tempe, AZ
12/07/2008*; 12:00 pm, FSN	No. 19	Nebraska; Big 12/Pac-10 Hardwood Series	W 64–44	7–1	Wells Fargo Arena (7,164); Tempe, AZ
12/14/2008*; 1:15 pm	No. 20	vs. IUPUI	W 59–58 ^{OT}	8–1	U.S. Airways Center (6,207); Phoenix, AZ
12/20/2008*; 2:30 pm, FSN	No. 20	vs. BYU; Stadium Shootout	W 76–75	9–1	University of Phoenix Stadium (10,431); Glendale, AZ
12/23/2008*; 12:00 pm, FSAZ	No. 20	Idaho State	W 90–55	10–1	Wells Fargo Arena (7,698); Tempe, AZ
12/29/2008*; 7:00 pm	No. 17	Central Connecticut	W 84–47	11–1	Wells Fargo Arena (8,513); Tempe, AZ
Pac-12 regular season
01/02/2009; 8:30 pm	No. 17	at Stanford	W 90–60	12–1 (1–0)	Maples Pavilion (7,378); Stanford, CA
01/04/2009; 6:00 pm, FSAZ	No. 17	at California	L 71–81	12–2 (1–1)	Haas Pavilion (8,473); Berkeley, CA
01/08/2009; 8:30 pm, FSN	No. 20	Oregon State	W 69–38	13–2 (2–1)	Wells Fargo Arena (7,004); Tempe, AZ
01/10/2009; 12:00 pm, FSN	No. 20	Oregon	W 76–58	14–2 (3–1)	Wells Fargo Arena (7,902); Tempe, AZ
01/15/2009; 8:30 pm	No. 16	at USC	L 49–61	14–3 (3–2)	Galen Center (6,235); Los Angeles, CA
01/17/2009; 1:45 pm, CBS	No. 16	at UCLA	W 61–58 ^{OT}	15–3 (4–2)	Pauley Pavilion (11,659); Los Angeles, CA
01/21/2009; 7:30 pm, FSAZ	No. 17	at Arizona	W 53–47	16–3 (5–2)	McKale Center (14,640); Tucson, AZ
01/29/2009; 7:00 pm	No. 14	Washington State	L 55–65	16–4 (5–3)	Wells Fargo Arena (10,745); Tempe, AZ
01/31/2009; 3:30 pm, FSAZ	No. 14	No. 23 Washington	L 71–84	16–5 (5–4)	Wells Fargo Arena (9,367); Tempe, AZ
02/05/2009; 8:30 pm, FSN	No. 24	at Oregon	W 66–57	17–5 (6–4)	McArthur Court (7,670); Eugene, OR
02/03/2009; 6:30 pm, FSAZ	No. 24	at Oregon State	W 49–38	18–5 (7–4)	Gill Coliseum (7,129); Corvallis, OR
02/12/2009; 7:00 pm, ESPN	No. 18	No. 11 UCLA	W 74–67	19–5 (8–4)	Wells Fargo Arena (13,368); Tempe, AZ
02/15/2009; 8:00 pm, FSN	No. 18	USC	W 65–53	20–5 (9–4)	Wells Fargo Arena (11,621); Tempe, AZ
02/22/2009; 8:00 pm, FSN	No. 14	Arizona	W 70–68	21–5 (10–4)	Wells Fargo Arena (14,123); Tempe, AZ
02/26/2009; 9:00 pm, FSAZ	No. 14	at No. 21 Washington	L 70–73 ^{OT}	21–6 (10–5)	Bank of America Arena (10,000); Seattle, WA
02/28/2009; 3:00 pm, FSAZ	No. 14	at Washington State	L 49–51 ^{OT}	21–7 (10–6)	Beasley Coliseum (10,712); Pullman, WA
03/05/2009; 6:30 pm, FSAZ	No. 21	Stanford	L 46–62	21–8 (10–7)	Wells Fargo Arena (9,272); Tempe, AZ
03/07/2009; 12:00 pm, CBS	No. 21	California	W 83–66	22–8 (11–7)	Wells Fargo Arena (9,262); Tempe, AZ
Pac-10 tournament
03/12/2009; 1:00 pm, FSN	No. 23	vs. Arizona; Quarterfinals	W 68–56	23–8	Staples Center; Los Angeles, CA
03/13/2009; 7:00 pm, FSN	No. 23	vs. No. 13 Washington; Semifinals	W 75–65	24–8	Staples Center; Los Angeles, CA
03/14/2009; 4:00 pm, CBS	No. 23	vs. USC; Championship	L 63–66	24–9	Staples Center (16,988); Los Angeles, CA
NCAA tournament
03/19/2009*; 11:45 am, CBS	(6 S) No. 19	vs. (11 S) Temple; First Round	W 66–57	25–9	American Airlines Arena (10,163); Miami, FL
03/21/2009*; 9:10 am, CBS	(6 S) No. 19	vs. (3 S) No. 13 Syracuse; Second Round	L 67–78	25–10	American Airlines Arena (10,204); Miami, FL
*Non-conference game. ^{#}Rankings from AP Poll. (#) Tournament seedings in parentheses. S=South Region. All times are in Mountain Time.

== Rankings ==
Ranking movements Legend: ██ Increase in ranking ██ Decrease in ranking т = Tied with team above or below
	Week																			
Poll	Pre	1	2	3	4	5	6	7	8	9	10	11	12	13	14	15	16	17	18	Final
AP	15	15 т	14	19	20	20	20	17	20	16	17	14	24	18	14	14	21	23	19	Not released
Coaches	15	15	14	19	18	17	17	14	16	15	16	14	23	18	11 т	11	21	23	19	19
