= 2008–09 Stanford Cardinal men's basketball team =

American college basketball season

2008–2009 Stanford Cardinal men's basketball

CBI, semifinals
- Conference: Pac-10 Conference
- Record: 20–14 (6–12 Pac-10)
- Head coach: Johnny Dawkins (1st season)
- Assistant coaches: Dick Davey; Rodney Tention; Mike Schrage
- Home arena: Maples Pavilion

2008–09 Pacific-10 Conference men's basketball standings
	Conf.				Overall
Team	W		L	PCT	W		L	PCT
No. 15 Washington	14	–	4	.778	26	–	9	.743
No. 18 UCLA	13	–	5	.722	26	–	9	.743
No. 19 Arizona State	11	–	7	.611	25	–	10	.714
California	11	–	7	.611	22	–	11	.667
USC†	9	–	9	.500	22	–	13	.629
Arizona	9	–	9	.500	21	–	14	.600
Washington State	8	–	10	.444	17	–	16	.515
Oregon State	7	–	11	.389	18	–	18	.500
Stanford	6	–	12	.333	20	–	14	.588
Oregon	2	–	16	.111	8	–	23	.258
† Conference tournament winner Rankings from AP Poll

The 2008–09 Stanford Cardinal men's basketball team represented Stanford University during the 2008–09 NCAA Division I men's basketball season. The Cardinal were led by first year head coach Johnny Dawkins, and played their home games at Maples Pavilion as a member of the Pacific-10 Conference.

== Previous season ==
The Cardinal began the year ranked in the top 25 in both polls and would stay until a loss to Siena knocked them out. They did not see the rankings again until conference play where they would climb as high as seventh in the nation. After going 13–5 in conference play, the Cardinal received a two seed in the 2008 Pac-10 Conference tournament. Winning their first two games against Arizona and Washington State, Stanford would face UCLA. whom they lost two twice in the regular season, and just like the regular season would lose in the Finals 67–64.

Ranked 11th in the nation at the time, Stanford received a third seed in the 2008 NCAA tournament. They were placed in the South Region with a first round battle against 14 seed Cornell. Stanford would beat Cornell 78–53 and would face Marquette in the second round. Stanford and Marquette took the game into overtime, and they came out on top of the Golden Eagles 82–81. Stanford reached the Sweet Sixteen for the first time since 2001 and their first time under Trent Johnson. Their Sweet Sixteen opponent was 2 seed Texas, but would come up short against the Longhorns 82–62.

At the end of the season, Trent Johnson moved on from Stanford University and accepted the LSU job. Stanford introduced Johnny Dawkins as head coach April 27, 2008.

== Offseason ==
=== Departures ===
Stanford Departures
Name	Number	Pos.	Height	Weight	Year	Hometown	Reason for Departure
Brook Lopez	11	F	7'0"	240	Sophomore	Fresno, CA	Drafted 10th overall in the 2008 NBA draft by the New Jersey Nets
Robin Lopez	42	F	7'0"	245	Sophomore	Fresno, CA	Drafted 15th overall in the 2008 NBA draft by the Phoenix Suns
Fred Washington	44	F	6'5"	205	Senior	Los Angeles, CA	Graduated
Peter Prowitt	55	C	6'10"	250	Senior	Arlington, VA	Graduated
Taj Finger	31	F	6'8"	190	Senior	Mt. Kisco, NY	Graduated

=== Incoming ===
College recruiting information
Name	Hometown	School	Height	Weight	Commit date
Jeremy Green; G	Austin, TX	Bowie High School	6 ft 4 in (1.93 m)	190 lb (86 kg)	Jul 7, 2007
Jeremy Green; G	Recruit ratings: Rivals: 247Sports: (91)				
Jarrett Mann; F	Middletown, DE	Blair Academy	6 ft 5 in (1.96 m)	180 lb (82 kg)	May 26, 2007
Jarrett Mann; F	Recruit ratings: Rivals: (87)				
Elliott Bullock; F	Salt Lake City, UT	Olympus High School	6 ft 10 in (2.08 m)	245 lb (111 kg)	
Elliott Bullock; F	Recruit ratings: Scout:				
Jack Trotter; F	Moraga, CA	Campolindo High School	6 ft 9 in (2.06 m)	295 lb (134 kg)	
Jack Trotter; F	Recruit ratings: (68)				
Matei Daian; C	Bucharest, Romania	Saint Sava National College	6 ft 10 in (2.08 m)	240 lb (110 kg)	
Matei Daian; C	Recruit ratings: No ratings found				
Overall recruit ranking:
Note: In many cases, Scout, Rivals, 247Sports, On3, and ESPN may conflict in their listings of height and weight.; In these cases, the average was taken. ESPN grades are on a 100-point scale.; Sources: "Stanford Commit List for 2008". Rivals.; "2008 Team Ranking". Rivals.

== Roster ==
2008–09 Stanford Cardinal men's basketball team
Players
Coaches

Pos.	#	Name	Height	Weight	Year	Previous school	Hometown
G	1	Mitch Johnson	6 ft 1 in (1.85 m)	185 lb (84 kg)	Sr	O'Dea High School	Seattle, WA
G	2	Landry Fields	6 ft 5 in (1.96 m)	185 lb (84 kg)	Jr	Los Alamitos High School	Los Alamitos, CA
G	3	Jarrett Mann	6 ft 3 in (1.91 m)	180 lb (82 kg)	Fr	Blair Academy	Middletown, DE
G	4	Anthony Goods	6 ft 3 in (1.91 m)	195 lb (88 kg)	Sr	Centennial High School	Corona, CA
G	5	Jeremy Green	6 ft 4 in (1.93 m)	190 lb (86 kg)	Fr	Bowie High School	Austin TX
G	10	Drew Shiller	6 ft 0 in (1.83 m)	185 lb (84 kg)	RS Jr	Burlingame High School; San Francisco	Burlingame, CA
G	13	Emmanuel Igbinosa	6 ft 2 in (1.88 m)	185 lb (84 kg)	Jr	Bellaire High School	Houston, TX
F	15	Lawrence Hill	6 ft 8 in (2.03 m)	205 lb (93 kg)	Sr	Deer Valley High School	Glendale, AZ
G	22	Kenny Brown	6 ft 1 in (1.85 m)	190 lb (86 kg)	RS Sr	Carroll Senior High School	Southlake, TX
F	24	Josh Owens	6 ft 8 in (2.03 m)	215 lb (98 kg)	So	Phillips Exeter Academy	Kennesaw, GA
G	32	Da'veed Dildy	6 ft 5 in (1.96 m)	185 lb (84 kg)	RS So	King College Prep	Chicago, IL
C	34	Will Paul	6 ft 9 in (2.06 m)	220 lb (100 kg)	Jr	Calallen High School	Corpus Christi, TX
F	50	Jack Trotter	6 ft 9 in (2.06 m)	200 lb (91 kg)	Fr	Campolindo High School	Maraga, CA
F	51	Elloitt Bullock	6 ft 10 in (2.08 m)	220 lb (100 kg)	Fr	Olympus High School	Salt Lake City, UT
C	52	Matei Daian	6 ft 10 in (2.08 m)	220 lb (100 kg)	Fr	Saint Sava National College	Bucharest, Romania

Head coach

- Johnny Dawkins (Duke)

Assistant coach(es)

- Dick Davey (Pacific)
- Rodney Tention (San Francisco)
- Mike Schrage (Indiana)

Legend

- (C) Team captain
- (S) Suspended
- (I) Ineligible
- (W) Walk-on
- Injured
- Current redshirt

Roster
Last update: May 14, 2022

== Schedule and results ==
Date time, TV	Rank^{#}	Opponent^{#}	Result	Record	Site (attendance) city, state
Exhibition
November 4, 2008		Cal State Stanislaus	W 93–54	–	Maples Pavilion; Stanford, CA
November 8, 2008		Seattle Pacific	W 97–56	–	Maples Pavilion; Stanford, CA
Regular season
November 14, 2008*; 4:00 PM		at Yale	W 75–67	1–0	Payne Whitney Gymnasium (2,532); New Haven, CT
November 18, 2008*; 7:30 PM		Cal State Northridge	W 103–85	2–0	Maples Pavilion (6,593); Stanford, CA
November 26, 2008*; 7:30 PM		Air Force	W 76–57	3–0	Maples Pavilion (6,836); Stanford, CA
November 29, 2008*; 7:30 PM, FSN		Colorado; Big 12/Pac-10 Hardwood Series	W 76–52	4–0	Maples Pavilion (6,988); Stanford, CA
December 14, 2008*; 4:00 PM, CBS CS		at Colorado State	W 74–63	5–0	Moby Arena (2,933); Fort Collins, CO
December 17, 2008*; 7:30 PM, CSN BA		Northern Arizona	W 66–57	6–0	Maples Pavilion (6,795); Stanford, CA
December 20, 2008*; 7:00 PM		Northwestern	W 65–59	7–0	Maples Pavilion (7,121); Stanford, CA
December 23, 2008*; 8:00 PM, ESPNU		at Santa Clara	W 77–69	8–0	Leavey Center (3,146); Santa Clara, CA
December 28, 2008*; 7:00 PM, FSN		Texas Tech; Big 12/Pac-10 Hardwood Series	W 111–56	9–0	Maples Pavilion (6,978); Stanford, CA
December 30, 2008*; 7:30 PM		Hartford	W 69–55	10–0	Maples Pavilion (6,898); Stanford, CA
January 2, 2009; 8:30 PM		No. 17 Arizona State	L 60–90	10–1 (0–1)	Maples Pavilion (7,378); Stanford, CA
January 4, 2009; 7:00 PM, FSN		Arizona	W 76–60	11–1 (1–1)	Maples Pavilion (7,189); Stanford, CA
January 8, 2009; 7:30 PM, FSNNW		Washington	L 83–84	11–2 (1–2)	Bank of America Arena (9,291); Seattle, WA
January 10, 2009; 7:00 PM, FSNNW		at Washington State	L 54–55	11–3 (1–3)	Friel Court (7,332); Pullman, WA
January 17, 2009; 5:00 PM, CSN BA		No. 22 California	W 75–69	12–3 (2–3)	Maples Pavilion (7,329); Stanford, CA
January 22, 2009; 7:30 PM		Oregon	W 77–55	13–3 (3–3)	Maples Pavilion (6,902); Stanford, CA
January 24, 2009; 7:00 PM, FSNNW		Oregon State	L 62–77	13–4 (3–4)	Maples Pavilion (7,329); Stanford, CA
January 29, 2009; 7:30 PM, FSN Prime Ticket		at USC	L 69–70	13–5 (3–5)	Galen Center (7,963); Los Angeles, CA
January 31, 2009; 12:30 PM, ABC		at No. 16 UCLA	L 63–97	13–6 (3–6)	Pauley Pavilion (11,129); Los Angeles, CA
February 5, 2009; 7:30 PM		Washington State	W 65–64	14–6 (4–6)	Maples Pavilion (6,887); Stanford, CA
February 8, 2009; 2:30 PM, FSN		No. 22 Washington	L 68–75	14–7 (4–7)	Maples Pavilion (7,329); Stanford, CA
February 10, 2009*; 7:30 PM		Cal State Bakersfield	W 85–50	15–7	Maples Pavilion (6,748); Stanford, CA
February 14, 2009; 2:00 PM, FSN		at California	L 75–82	15–8 (4–8)	Haas Pavilion (10,503); Berkeley, CA
February 19, 2009; 7:00 PM		at Oregon State	L 54–66	15–9 (4–9)	Gill Coliseum (6,229); Corvallis, CA
February 21, 2009; 5:00 PM, CSNNW		at Oregon	L 60–68	15–10 (4–10)	McArthur Court (7,932); Eugene, OR
February 26, 2009; 7:30 PM, FSN Prime Ticket		UCLA	L 71–76	15–11 (4–11)	Maples Pavilion (7,156); Stanford, CA
February 28, 2009; 5:00 PM		USC	W 75–63	16–11 (5–11)	Maples Pavilion; Stanford, CA
March 5, 2009; 5:30 PM, FS Arizona		at No. 21 Arizona State	W 62–46	17–11 (6–11)	Wells Fargo Arena (9,272); Tempe, AZ
March 7, 2009; 4:30 PM, FS Arizona		at Arizona	L 87–101	17–12 (6–12)	McKale Center (14,723); Tucson, AZ
Pac-10 tournament
March 11, 2009; 6:00 pm, FSN	(9)	vs. (8) Oregon State; First Round	W 62–54	18–12	Staples Center (10,964); Los Angeles, CA
March 12, 2009; 12:00 pm, FSN	(9)	vs. (1) No. 13 Washington; Quarterfinals	L 73–85	18–13	Staples Center (14,732); Los Angeles, CA
College Basketball Invitational
March 18, 2009*; 7:00 pm	(M1)	vs. (M4) Boise State; First Round	W 96–76	19–13	Maples Pavilion (1,243); Stanford, CA
March 23, 2009*; 5:00 pm, HDNet	(M1)	vs. (M2) Wichita State; Quarterfinals	W 70–56	20–13	Charles Koch Arena (8,812); Wichita, KS
March 25, 2009*; 7:00 pm, HDNet	(3)	vs. (2) Oregon State; Semifinals	L 62–65 ^{OT}	20–14	Gill Coliseum (4,759); Corvallis, OR
*Non-conference game. ^{#}Rankings from AP Poll. (#) Tournament seedings in parentheses. M=Midwest. All times are in Pacific Standard Time.

== Rankings ==
Ranking movements Legend: RV = Received votes
	Week																			
Poll	Pre	1	2	3	4	5	6	7	8	9	10	11	12	13	14	15	16	17	18	Final
AP	RV						RV	RV												Not released
Coaches							RV	RV	RV											
