= 2008–09 Oregon Ducks men's basketball team =

American college basketball season

2008–09 Oregon Ducks men's basketball
- Conference: Pacific-10 Conference
- Record: 8–23 (2–16 Pac-10)
- Head coach: Ernie Kent
- Assistant coaches: Mark Hudson; Kenny Payne
- Home arena: McArthur Court

2008–09 Pacific-10 Conference men's basketball standings
	Conf.				Overall
Team	W		L	PCT	W		L	PCT
No. 15 Washington	14	–	4	.778	26	–	9	.743
No. 18 UCLA	13	–	5	.722	26	–	9	.743
No. 19 Arizona State	11	–	7	.611	25	–	10	.714
California	11	–	7	.611	22	–	11	.667
USC†	9	–	9	.500	22	–	13	.629
Arizona	9	–	9	.500	21	–	14	.600
Washington State	8	–	10	.444	17	–	16	.515
Oregon State	7	–	11	.389	18	–	18	.500
Stanford	6	–	12	.333	20	–	14	.588
Oregon	2	–	16	.111	8	–	23	.258
† Conference tournament winner Rankings from AP Poll

The 2008–09 Oregon Ducks men's basketball team represented the University of Oregon in the college basketball season of 2008–09. The team was coached by Ernie Kent and played their home games at McArthur Court.

The season came to an end on March 11, 2009, when the Ducks lost to Washington State in the first round of the Pac-10 tournament at the Staples Center in Los Angeles, 62–40. There were speculations that coach Ernie Kent would be fired after the season, however, he was retained as head coach.

Oregon's miserable 8–23 overall record and 2–17 record vs Pac 10 opponents remains widely regarded as the worst season in Oregon men's basketball history.

== Roster ==
Note: Flags indicate national team eligibility at FIBA sanctioned events. Players may hold other non-FIBA nationality not displayed.

No.		Position	Player
2	(United States)	G	Ben Voogd
3	(United States)	G	Garrett Sim
11	(Canada)	F	Frantz Dorsainvil
12	(United States)	G	Tajuan Porter
13	(Nigeria)	G	Churchill Odia
14	(United States)	G	Matthew Humphrey
15	(United States)	G	John Elorriaga
21	(United States)	G	Nicholas Fearn
22	(United States)	F	Drew Wiley
24	(United States)	G	LeKendric Longmire
32	(United States)	G	Teondre Williams
33	(United States)	C	Michael Dunigan
32	(United States)	G	Kamyron Brown
42	(United States)	F/C	Josh Crittle
50	(United States)	F	Joevan Catron

== Recruiting ==
Class of 2009 Recruits

College recruiting information
Name	Hometown	School	Height	Weight	Commit date
E. J. Singler; SF	Medford, Oregon	South Medford High School	6 ft 6 in (1.98 m)	195 lb (88 kg)	Nov 12, 2008
E. J. Singler; SF	Recruit ratings: Scout: Rivals: (86)				

College recruiting information
Name	Hometown	School	Height	Weight	Commit date
Jamil Wilson; SF	Racine, Wisconsin	William Horlick High School	6 ft 6 in (1.98 m)	215 lb (98 kg)	Mar 9, 2009
Jamil Wilson; SF	Recruit ratings: Scout: Rivals: (92)				

== Schedule and results ==
Date time, TV	Rank^{#}	Opponent^{#}	Result	Record	Site (attendance) city, state
Regular season
11/14/2008*; 8:00 pm, CSNNW		Northern Colorado	W 66–64	1–0	McArthur Court (8,273); Eugene, Oregon
11/17/2008*; 7:00 pm, CSNNW		Oakland	L 79–82 ^{OT}	1–1	McArthur Court (7,924); Eugene, Oregon
11/21/2008*; 7:00 pm		at UC Irvine	W 84–77	2–1	Bren Events Center (4,206); Irvine, California
11/24/2008*; 9:00 pm, ESPN2		vs. Alabama; Maui Invitational Tournament first round	W 92–69	3–1	Lahaina Civic Center (2,500); Maui, Hawaii
11/25/2008*; 9:00 pm, ESPN		vs. No. 1 North Carolina; Maui Invitational Tournament semifinals	L 69–98	3–2	Lahaina Civic Center (2,500); Maui, Hawaii
11/26/2008*; 1:30 pm, ESPN2		vs. No. 7 Texas; Maui Invitational Tournament 3rd place game	L 57–70	3–3	Lahaina Civic Center (2,500); Maui, Hawaii
12/03/2008*; 6:00 pm, The Mtn.		at Utah	L 81–95	3–4	Jon M. Huntsman Center (9,290); Salt Lake City, Utah
12/07/2008*; 5:30 pm, FSN		Kansas State; Big 12/Pac-10 Hardwood Series	W 75–70	4–4	McArthur Court (8,256); Eugene, Oregon
12/13/2008*; 5:00 pm, CSNNW		vs. San Diego; Papé Jam	L 57–64	4–5	Rose Garden (8,374); Portland, Oregon
12/17/2008*; 7:00 pm, CSNNW		Saint Mary's	L 73–78	4–6	McArthur Court (7,163); Eugene, Oregon
12/20/2008*; 5:00 pm, CSNNW		Portland	W 79–76 ^{OT}	5–6	McArthur Court (7,509); Eugene, Oregon
12/29/2008*; 7:00 pm, CSNNW		Long Beach State	W 86–74	6–6	McArthur Court (7,783); Eugene, Oregon
01/02/2009; 1:00 pm, CSNNW		USC	L 62–83	6–7 (0–1)	McArthur Court (7,664); Eugene, Oregon
01/04/2009; 12:30 pm, FSN		No. 9 UCLA	L 74–83	6–8 (0–2)	McArthur Court (8,595); Eugene, Oregon
01/08/2009; 5:30 pm, CSNNW		at Arizona	L 52–67	6–9 (0–3)	McKale Center (12,812); Tucson, Arizona
01/10/2009; 11:00 am, FSN		at No. 16 Arizona State	L 58–76	6–10 (0–4)	Wells Fargo Arena (7,902); Tempe, Arizona
01/15/2009; 7:00 pm		Washington	L 67–84	6–11 (0–5)	McArthur Court (8,237); Eugene, Oregon
01/17/2009; 11:00 am, FSN		Washington State	L 62–83	6–12 (0–6)	McArthur Court (8,261); Eugene, Oregon
01/22/2009; 7:30 pm		at Stanford	L 55–77	6–13 (0–7)	Maples Pavilion (6,902); Stanford, California
01/24/2009; 3:00 pm, CSNNW		at California	L 69–76	6–14 (0–8)	Haas Pavilion (9,550); Berkeley, California
01/31/2009; 4:30 pm, FSNNW		at Oregon State; Civil War	L 54–57	6–15 (0–9)	Gill Coliseum (10,129); Corvallis, Oregon
02/05/2009; 7:30 pm, FSN		No. 23 Arizona State	L 57–66	6–16 (0–10)	McArthur Court (7,670); Eugene, Oregon
02/07/2009; 12:30 pm, ABC		Arizona	L 77–87	6–17 (0–11)	McArthur Court (13,144); Eugene, Oregon
02/12/2009; 7:00 pm		at Washington State	L 38–67	6–18 (0–12)	Beasley Coliseum (7,068); Pullman, Washington
02/14/2009; 8:00 pm, FSN		at No. 24 Washington	L 84–103	6–19 (0–13)	Bank of America Arena (10,000); Seattle, Washington
02/19/2009; 6:00 pm, CSNNW		California	L 60–78	6–20 (0–14)	McArthur Court (7,529); Eugene, Oregon
02/21/2009; 5:00 pm, CSNNW		Stanford	W 68–60	7–20 (1–14)	McArthur Court (7,932); Eugene, Oregon
03/01/2009; 7:00 pm, FSN		Oregon State; Civil War	W 79–69	8–20 (2–14)	McArthur Court (8,769); Eugene, Oregon
03/05/2009; 7:30 pm		at USC	L 66–80	8–21 (2–15)	Galen Center (5,853); Los Angeles, California
03/07/2009; 12:30 pm, ABC		at No. 17 UCLA	L 68–94	8–22 (2–16)	Pauley Pavilion (10,982); Los Angeles, California
Pac-10 tournament
03/11/2009; 8:30 pm, FSN	(10)	vs. (7) Washington State; First Round	L 40–62	8–23	Staples Center (10,964); Los Angeles, California
*Non-conference game. ^{#}Rankings from ESPN/USA Today Coaches Poll. (#) Tournament seedings in parentheses. All times are in Pacific Time.
