= 2008–09 Washington Huskies men's basketball team =

American college basketball season

2008–09 Washington Huskies men's basketball

Pacific-10 regular season champions

NCAA tournament, second round
- Conference: Pacific-10 Conference

Ranking
- Coaches: No. 16
- AP: No. 15
- Record: 26–9 (14–4 Pac-10)
- Head coach: Lorenzo Romar
- Assistant coaches: Raphael Chillious; Paul Fortier; Jim Shaw
- Home arena: Bank of America Arena

2008–09 Pacific-10 Conference men's basketball standings
	Conf.				Overall
Team	W		L	PCT	W		L	PCT
No. 15 Washington	14	–	4	.778	26	–	9	.743
No. 18 UCLA	13	–	5	.722	26	–	9	.743
No. 19 Arizona State	11	–	7	.611	25	–	10	.714
California	11	–	7	.611	22	–	11	.667
USC†	9	–	9	.500	22	–	13	.629
Arizona	9	–	9	.500	21	–	14	.600
Washington State	8	–	10	.444	17	–	16	.515
Oregon State	7	–	11	.389	18	–	18	.500
Stanford	6	–	12	.333	20	–	14	.588
Oregon	2	–	16	.111	8	–	23	.258
† Conference tournament winner Rankings from AP Poll

The 2008–09 Washington Huskies men's basketball team represented the University of Washington in the 2008–09 college basketball season. This was head coach Lorenzo Romar's 7th season at Washington. The Huskies played their home games at Bank of America Arena and were members of the Pacific-10 Conference. They finished the season 26–9, 14–4 in Pac-10 play. They captured the Pac–10 regular season title and an at-large bid to the 2009 NCAA Division I men's basketball tournament. They earned a 4 seed in the West Region, where they defeated Mississippi State in the first round before losing to Purdue in the second round.

== 2008–09 team ==
=== Roster ===
#	Name	Height	Weight (lbs.)	Position	Class	Hometown	Previous team(s)
1	Venoy Overton	5'11"	185	G	So.	Seattle, WA, U.S.	Franklin HS
2	Isaiah Thomas	5'8"	180	G	Fr.	Tacoma, WA, U.S.	South Kent School
5	Justin Dentmon	5'11"	185	G	Sr.	Carbondale, IL, U.S.	Winchendon School (Mass.)
11	Matthew Bryan-Amaning	6'9"	235	F	So.	London, England, U.K.	South Kent School
15	Scott Suggs	6'6"	190	G	So.	Washington, MO, U.S.	Washington HS
20	Quincy Pondexter	6'6"	215	F	Jr.	Fresno, CA, U.S.	San Joaquin Memorial HS
21	Artem Wallace	6'8"	250	F	Sr.	Toledo, WA, U.S.	Toledo HS
22	Justin Holiday	6'6"	180	F	So.	Chatsworth, CA, U.S.	Campbell Hall School
23	C. J. Wilcox	6'5"	180	G	Fr.	Pleasant Grove, UT, U.S.	Pleasant Grove HS
31	Elston Turner	6'4"	205	G	Fr.	Missouri City, TX, U.S.	Elkins HS
32	Joe Wolfinger	7'0"	255	C	Jr.	Portland, OR, U.S.	Northfield Mount Hermon School
33	Tyreese Breshers	6'7"	255	F	Fr.	Los Angeles, CA, U.S.	Price HS
40	Jon Brockman	6'7"	255	F	Sr.	Snohomish, WA, U.S.	Snohomish Sr. HS
44	Darnell Gant	6'8"	215	F	RS Fr.	Los Angeles, CA, U.S.	Crenshaw HS

=== Coaching staff ===
Name	Position	Year at Washington	Alma mater (year)
Lorenzo Romar	Head coach	7th	Washington (1980)
Raphael Chillious	Assistant coach	1st	Lafayette (1996)
Paul Fortier	Assistant coach	4th	Washington (2003)
Jim Shaw	Assistant coach	5th	Western Oregon State (1985)
Lance LaVetter	Director of basketball operations	7th	Northern Arizona (1992)

== 2008–09 schedule and results ==
Date time, TV	Rank^{#}	Opponent^{#}	Result	Record	Site (attendance) city, state
Exhibition
11/06/2008*; 7:00 pm		Western Washington	W 105–85		Bank of America Arena (7,836); Seattle, WA
Non-conference regular season
11/15/2008*; 8:00 pm, CSNNW		at Portland	L 74–80	0–1	Chiles Center (2,617); Portland, OR
11/18/2008*; 7:00 pm		Cleveland State; O'Reilly Auto Parts CBE Classic	W 78–63	1–1	Bank of America Arena (7,316); Seattle, WA
11/20/2008*; 7:00 pm		Florida International; O'Reilly Auto Parts CBE Classic	W 74–51	2–1	Bank of America Arena (7,532); Seattle, WA
11/24/2008*; 7:00 pm, ESPN2		vs. No. 22 Kansas; O'Reilly Auto Parts CBE Classic Semifinals	L 54–73	2–2	Sprint Center (14,720); Kansas City, MO
11/25/2008*; 7:00 pm, ESPNU		vs. Florida; O'Reilly Auto Parts CBE Classic 3rd place game	L 84–86	2–3	Sprint Center (NA); Kansas City, MO
11/29/2008*; 1:00 pm, FSNNW		Pacific	W 72–54	3–3	Bank of America Arena (7,527); Seattle, WA
12/04/2008*; 8:00 pm, FSN		Oklahoma State; Big 12/Pac-10 Hardwood Series	W 83–65	4–3	Bank of America Arena (7,789); Seattle, WA
12/06/2008*; 6:30 pm, FSNNW		Texas Southern	W 88–52	5–3	Bank of America Arena (7,241); Seattle, WA
12/14/2008*; 5:00 pm, FSNNW		Portland State	W 84–83	6–3	Bank of America Arena (7,280); Seattle, WA
12/20/2008*; 7:00 pm, FSNNW		Eastern Washington	W 83–50	7–3	Bank of America Arena (7,401); Seattle, WA
12/28/2008*; 12:00 pm, FSNNW		Montana	W 75–53	8–3	Bank of America Arena (8,260); Seattle, WA
12/30/2008*; 7:30 pm, FSNNW		Morgan State	W 81–67	9–3	Bank of America Arena (9,045); Seattle, WA
PAC-10 regular season
01/03/2009; 3:00 pm, FSNNW		at Washington State; Rivalry	W 68–48	10–3 (1–0)	Beasley Coliseum (8,107); Pullman, WA
01/08/2009; 7:30 pm, FSNNW		Stanford	W 84–83	11–3 (2–0)	Bank of America Arena (9,291); Seattle, WA
01/10/2009; 3:00 pm, FSNNW		California	L 85–88 ^{3OT}	11–4 (2–1)	Bank of America Arena (9,946); Seattle, WA
01/15/2009; 7:00 pm		at Oregon	W 84–67	12–4 (3–1)	McArthur Court (8,237); Eugene, OR
01/17/2009; 7:00 pm, FSNNW		at Oregon State	W 85–59	13–4 (4–1)	Gill Coliseum (6,648); Corvallis, OR
01/22/2009; 8:00 pm, FSN		USC	W 78–73	14–4 (5–1)	Bank of America Arena (10,000); Seattle, WA
01/24/2009; 1:00 pm, FSN		No. 13 UCLA	W 86–75	15–4 (6–1)	Bank of America Arena (10,000); Seattle, WA
01/29/2009; 5:30 pm, FSNNW	No. 23	at Arizona	L 97–106	15–5 (6–2)	McKale Center (14,434); Tucson, AZ
01/31/2009; 2:30 pm, FSNNW	No. 23	at No. 14 Arizona State	W 84–71	16–5 (7–2)	Wells Fargo Arena (9,367); Tucson, AZ
02/05/2009; 7:30 pm, FSNNW	No. 22	at California	L 71–86	16–6 (7–3)	Haas Pavilion (8,217); Berkeley, CA
02/07/2009; 2:30 pm, FSN	No. 22	at Stanford	W 75–68	17–6 (8–3)	Maples Pavilion (NA); Stanford, CA
02/12/2009; 8:00 pm, FSNNW		Oregon State	W 79–60	18–6 (9–3)	Bank of America Arena (10,000); Seattle, WA
02/14/2009; 8:00 pm, FSN		Oregon	W 103–84	19–6 (10–3)	Bank of America Arena (10,000); Seattle, WA
02/19/2009; 8:00 pm, FSN	No. 22	at No. 20 UCLA	L 76–85	19–7 (10–4)	Pauley Pavilion (11,145); Los Angeles, CA
02/21/2009; 4:00 pm, FSNNW	No. 22	at USC	W 60–51	20–7 (11–4)	Galen Center (7,325); Los Angeles, CA
02/26/2009; 8:00 pm, FSNNW	No. 21	No. 14 Arizona State	W 73–70 ^{OT}	21–7 (12–4)	Bank of America Arena (10,000); Seattle, WA
02/28/2009; 12:00 pm, FSN	No. 21	Arizona	W 83–78	22–7 (13–4)	Bank of America Arena (10,000); Seattle, WA
03/03/2009*; 8:00 pm, FSNNW	No. 16	Seattle; Rivalry	W 87–60	23–7	Bank of America Arena (10,000); Seattle, WA
03/07/2009; 2:30 pm, FSN	No. 16	Washington State; Rivalry	W 67–60	24–7 (14–4)	Bank of America Arena (10,000); Seattle, WA
PAC-10 Tournament
03/12/2009; 2:30 pm, FSN	No. 13	vs. Stanford; Quarterfinals	W 85–73	25–7	Staples Center (NA); Los Angeles, CA
03/13/2009; 6:00 pm, FSN	No. 13	vs. No. 23 Arizona State; Semifinals	L 65–75	25–8	Staples Center (NA); Los Angeles, CA
NCAA Tournament
03/19/2009*; 1:59 pm, CBS	No. 15	vs. Mississippi State; First Round	W 71–58	26–8	Rose Garden (NA); Portland, OR
03/21/2009*; 2:40 pm, CBS	No. 15	vs. No. 17 Purdue; Second Round	L 74–76	26–9	Rose Garden (NA); Portland, OR
*Non-conference game. ^{#}Rankings from AP Poll. (#) Tournament seedings in parentheses.

== Rankings ==
Ranking movements Legend: ██ Increase in ranking ██ Decrease in ranking — = Not ranked
	Week																			
Poll	Pre	1	2	3	4	5	6	7	8	9	10	11	12	13	14	15	16	17	18	Final
AP												23	22	—	22	21	16	13	15	Not released
Coaches													25	24	19	21	13	10	14	16
