= Jon Brockman =

American basketball player (born 1987)

Personal information
- Born: March 20, 1987 (age 39) Snohomish, Washington, U.S.
- Listed height: 6 ft 7 in (2.01 m)
- Listed weight: 245 lb (111 kg)

Career information
- High school: Snohomish (Snohomish, Washington)
- College: Washington (2005–2009)
- NBA draft: 2009: 2nd round, 38th overall pick
- Drafted by: Portland Trail Blazers
- Playing career: 2009–2016
- Position: Power forward

Career history
- 2009–2010: Sacramento Kings
- 2010–2012: Milwaukee Bucks
- 2012–2013: Limoges CSP
- 2013–2014: Élan Chalon
- 2014–2016: MHP Riesen Ludwigsburg

Career highlights
- Chip Hilton Player of the Year (2009); 2× First-team All-Pac-10 (2007, 2009); Second-team All-Pac-10 (2008); McDonald's All-American (2005); Second-team Parade All-American (2005); Washington Mr. Basketball (2005)
- Stats at NBA.com
- Stats at Basketball Reference

Jonathan Rodney Brockman (born March 20, 1987) is an American former professional basketball player. He was the starting power forward and team captain for the University of Washington men's basketball team. He is the University of Washington's all-time leading rebounder and second-all-time leading scorer in University of Washington history. He grabbed the 1,000th rebound of his career on December 30, 2008, in a win over Morgan State, and became Washington's all-time leading rebounder on January 15, 2009, in a win over Oregon, breaking Doug Smart's school record of 1,051.

== High school career ==
Brockman attended Snohomish High School and was a 4-year letterman. He played alongside his brother for two years. He averaged 22 points per game and 13 rebounds per game as a junior.

In his senior year, he led Snohomish to a 16–5 record, averaging 29.8 points per game and 12 rebounds per game. He was ranked as the 20th-best prospect in the country and 5th-best among power forwards by Scout.com. He was named to the McDonald's All-American Game and made the semifinals in the 2005 High School Slam Dunk Competition. He was the third-leading scorer in the state of Washington in the 2004–05 season, and was one of the best rebounders in the class of 2005.

Considered a four-star recruit by Rivals.com, Brockman was listed as the No. 13 power forward and the No. 47 player in the nation in 2005.

== College career ==
He played alongside future NBA players Brandon Roy and Bobby Jones and was named to the Pac-10 all-freshman team. He played in the 2006 NCAA tournament, in which Washington lost to UConn in the Sweet 16. Brockman led the Huskies in rebounds and was 7th in the Pac-10. He ended the season with four double-doubles. He has the second-highest total rebounds by a freshman in Husky history and was ranked 2nd in the Pac-10 with his 51.8 field goal percentage.

== Professional career ==
=== Sacramento Kings (2009–2010) ===
Brockman was selected 38th overall in the 2009 NBA draft by the Portland Trail Blazers, and his rights were later traded to the Sacramento Kings for the rights to Jeff Pendergraph. He averaged 5.4 points and 9.2 rebounds in the Las Vegas Summer League following the draft.

=== Milwaukee Bucks (2010–2012) ===
On July 21, 2010, Brockman was traded to the Milwaukee Bucks for Darnell Jackson and a 2011 second-round draft pick in a sign-and-trade, signing a 3-year, $3 million contract.

=== Limoges CSP (2012–2013) ===
On June 27, 2012, Brockman, Jon Leuer, Shaun Livingston, and a draft pick were traded to the Houston Rockets for Samuel Dalembert and draft picks. On October 29, Brockman was waived by Houston. On November 18, 2012, he signed with Limoges CSP of France for the rest of the 2012–13 season.

=== Élan Chalon (2013–2014) ===
In 2013, Brockman played for the New Orleans Pelicans in the Las Vegas Summer League. On June 6, 2013, he signed with Élan Chalon of France for the 2013–14 season.

=== Riesen Ludwigsburg (2014–2016) ===
On November 1, 2014, Brockman was signed by the German club MHP Riesen Ludwigsburg.

After playing overseas for four seasons, Brockman decided to retire prior to the beginning of the 2016–17 season.

== Coaching career ==
Brockman worked as a head coach for the Granite Falls Middle School 7th-grade boys' basketball team. He now works as an agricultural education teacher for his alma mater, Snohomish High School, while also helping to coach the boys' basketball team on which he once starred.

== Career statistics ==
Legend
GP	Games played	GS	Games started	MPG	Minutes per game
FG%	Field goal percentage	3P%	3-point field goal percentage	FT%	Free throw percentage
RPG	Rebounds per game	APG	Assists per game	SPG	Steals per game
BPG	Blocks per game	PPG	Points per game	**Bold**	Career high

=== NBA ===
==== Regular season ====
Year	Team	GP	GS	MPG	FG%	3P%	FT%	RPG	APG	SPG	BPG	PPG
2009–10	Sacramento	52	4	**12.6**	**.534**	–	.597	**4.1**	**.4**	**.3**	**.1**	**2.8**
2010–11	Milwaukee	**63**	**6**	10.7	.511	–	**.678**	2.9	.3	.2	.0	2.2
2011–12	Milwaukee	35	0	6.8	.333	.000	.467	2.1	.3	.1	.0	1.1
Career		150	10	10.5	.488	.000	.618	3.1	.3	.2	.1	2.1

=== College ===
Year	Team	GP	GS	MPG	FG%	3P%	FT%	RPG	APG	SPG	BPG	PPG
2005–06	Washington	33	32	24.1	.518	.000	**.667**	6.5	0.7	**1.1**	0.1	8.4
2006–07	Washington	32	32	28.8	**.550**	.000	.660	9.6	**1.1**	0.8	0.1	14.2
2007–08	Washington	32	31	**31.5**	.536	.000	.519	**11.6**	**1.1**	0.7	**0.3**	**17.8**
2008–09	Washington	**34**	**34**	30.5	.526	.000	.640	11.5	**1.1**	0.7	0.1	14.9
Career		131	129	28.7	.534	.000	.612	9.8	1.0	0.8	0.1	13.8
