= 2009 Pacific-10 Conference men's basketball tournament =

- Classification: Division I
- Season: 2008–09
- Teams: 10
- Site: Staples Center; Los Angeles, California
- Champions: USC (1st title)
- Winning coach: Tim Floyd (1st title)
- MVP: DeMar DeRozan, (USC)
- Attendance: 16,988
- Television: FSN; CBS (Championship game)

2008–09 Pacific-10 Conference men's basketball standings
	Conf.				Overall
Team	W		L	PCT	W		L	PCT
No. 15 Washington	14	–	4	.778	26	–	9	.743
No. 18 UCLA	13	–	5	.722	26	–	9	.743
No. 19 Arizona State	11	–	7	.611	25	–	10	.714
California	11	–	7	.611	22	–	11	.667
USC†	9	–	9	.500	22	–	13	.629
Arizona	9	–	9	.500	21	–	14	.600
Washington State	8	–	10	.444	17	–	16	.515
Oregon State	7	–	11	.389	18	–	18	.500
Stanford	6	–	12	.333	20	–	14	.588
Oregon	2	–	16	.111	8	–	23	.258
† Conference tournament winner Rankings from AP Poll

The 2009 Pacific Life Pacific-10 Conference men's basketball tournament began with the first round on March 11, 2009 at Staples Center in Los Angeles, California, with quarterfinals on March 12, semifinals on March 13, and the finals on March 14 (3:00 p.m. PT). In front of a crowd of 16,988, #6 seed USC defeated #4 seed Arizona State for the Pac-10 Tournament Championship, which was the first and only time for their program. This was also the first time a team seeded sixth in the tournament went on to win the championship, although it would happen again three years later. The Trojans received the conference's automatic bid to the NCAA National Tournament.

== Seeds ==
All Pacific-10 schools played in the tournament. Teams are seeded by conference record, with a tiebreaker system used to seed teams with identical conference records.

Seed	School	Conference (Overall)	Tiebreaker
1	Washington	14–4 (24–7)	1-1 vs. UCLA
2	UCLA	13–5 (24–7)	1-1 vs. UW
3	California	11–7 (22–9)	1-1 vs. ASU
4	Arizona State	11–7 (22–8)	1-1 vs. Cal
5	Arizona	9–9 (19–12)	1-1 vs USC
6	USC	9–9 (18–12)	1-1 vs. Arizona
7	Washington State	8–10 (16–14)	
8	Oregon State	7–11 (13–16)	
9	Stanford	6–12 (17–12)	
10	Oregon	2–16 (8–22)	

== 2009 Pac-10 tournament ==
Game time: First round – March 11, 6:00 p.m. & 8:30 p.m.; Quarterfinals – March 12, 12:00 p.m., 2:30 p.m., 6:00 p.m. & 8:30 p.m.; Semi-finals – March 13, 6:00 p.m. & 8:30 p.m.; Championship game – March 14, 3:00 p.m. (Pacific time)

First Round; March 11
8	Oregon State	54
9	Stanford	62
7	Washington State	62
10	Oregon	40

Quarterfinals; March 12
1	#13 Washington	85
9	Stanford	73
4	#23 Arizona State	68
5	Arizona	56
2	#15 UCLA	64
7	Washington State	53
3	California	75
6	USC	79

Semifinals; March 13
1	#13 Washington	65
4	#23 Arizona State	75
2	#15 UCLA	55
6	USC	65

Final; March 14
4	#23 Arizona State	63
6	USC	66

== Tournament notes ==
- Washington Huskies won the Pac-10 regular season title with a win over Arizona, 83–78, on Saturday, February 28, 2009, ending UCLA's three-year reign. They then went on to defeat Washington State, 67–60, for their first outright conference title since 1953.
- The Oregon State Beavers were coached by President Obama's brother-in-law, Craig Robinson, who, in his first season, improved them from 5–25 last season to 13 regular season wins this year.
- As a part of the tournament, a Pride of the Pac-10 luncheon was held on Friday, March 13, to honor the 2007-2008 Pac-10 Medal Winners, male and female athletes from each school for their excellence in athletics, academics and community service.
- Regular season honors: James Harden, Arizona State, player of the year; Isaiah Thomas, Washington, freshman of the year; Taj Gibson, USC, defensive player of the year; Justin Dentmon, Washington, most improved player of the year; Lorenzo Romar, Washington, coach of the year.
- Game officials for the championship game were Dick Cartmell, Dave Libbey and Michael Reed.
- This tournament had not one but two pairs of arch-rivals meet (a first). Arizona and ASU met (for the 2nd time in tournament history) in the second round and UCLA met USC (also for the 2nd time in tournament history) in the third round.
- Six teams were invited to play in the 2009 NCAA Men's Basketball Division I Championship: Washington, UCLA, California, Arizona State, USC, and Arizona.

== All-Tournament Team ==
- Daniel Hackett, USC
- Taj Gibson, USC
- Derek Glasser, Arizona State
- James Harden, Arizona State
- Jeff Pendergraph, Arizona State

== Most Outstanding Player ==
- DeMar DeRozan, USC

== 2009 Hall of Honor inductees ==
Pac-10 men’s basketball Hall of Honor banquet was held on Saturday, March 14, 2009 to honor the following individuals from each of the Pac-10 member schools.

- Lute Olson – Arizona
- Royce Youree – Arizona State
- Nibs Price – Cal
- Michael Warren – UCLA
- Greg Ballard – Oregon
- Paul Valenti – Oregon State
- Gus Williams – USC
- Jim Pollard – Stanford
- Detlef Schrempf – Washington
- Isaac Fontaine – Washington State

== See also ==
- 2009 NCAA Men's Division I Basketball Tournament
- Pacific-10 Conference men's basketball tournament
- 2008–09 Pacific-10 Conference men's basketball standings
