= 2008–09 California Golden Bears men's basketball team =

American college basketball season

2008–09 California Golden Bears men's basketball

NCAA tournament, first round
- Conference: Pacific-10 Conference
- Record: 22–11 (11–7 Pac-10)
- Head coach: Mike Montgomery
- Assistant coaches: Jay John; Travis DeCuire; Gregg Gottlieb
- Home arena: Haas Pavilion

2008–09 Pacific-10 Conference men's basketball standings
	Conf.				Overall
Team	W		L	PCT	W		L	PCT
No. 15 Washington	14	–	4	.778	26	–	9	.743
No. 18 UCLA	13	–	5	.722	26	–	9	.743
No. 19 Arizona State	11	–	7	.611	25	–	10	.714
California	11	–	7	.611	22	–	11	.667
USC†	9	–	9	.500	22	–	13	.629
Arizona	9	–	9	.500	21	–	14	.600
Washington State	8	–	10	.444	17	–	16	.515
Oregon State	7	–	11	.389	18	–	18	.500
Stanford	6	–	12	.333	20	–	14	.588
Oregon	2	–	16	.111	8	–	23	.258
† Conference tournament winner Rankings from AP Poll

The 2008–09 California Golden Bears men's basketball team represented the University of California, Berkeley in the 2008–09 NCAA Division I men's basketball season. This was head coach Mike Montgomery's first season at California. The Golden Bears played their home games at Haas Pavilion and participated in the Pacific-10 Conference. The Golden Bears finished the season 22–11, 11–7 in Pac-10 play to finish in third place. They lost to USC in the quarterfinals of the Pac-10 tournament. They received an at–large bid to the 2009 NCAA Division I men's basketball tournament, earning a 7 seed in the West Region. They were beaten by 10 seed Maryland in the first round.

== Roster ==
2008–09 California Golden Bears men's basketball team
Players
Coaches

Pos.	#	Name	Height	Weight	Year	Hometown
G	0	Nican Robinson (W)	5 ft 10 in (1.78 m)	185 lb (84 kg)	RS Jr	Oakland, California
G	1	D.J. Seeley	6 ft 4 in (1.93 m)	185 lb (84 kg)	Fr	Stockton, California
G	2	Jorge Gutiérrez	6 ft 3 in (1.91 m)	185 lb (84 kg)	Fr	Chihuahua, Mexico
G	3	Jerome Randle	5 ft 10 in (1.78 m)	160 lb (73 kg)	Jr	Chicago, Illinois
F	10	Jamal Boykin	6 ft 8 in (2.03 m)	230 lb (104 kg)	RS Jr	Los Angeles, California
G	12	Nigel Carter (W)	6 ft 4 in (1.93 m)	210 lb (95 kg)	Fr	Los Angeles, California
G	13	Nikola Knezevic	6 ft 3 in (1.91 m)	185 lb (84 kg)	RS Jr	Belgrade, Serbia
C	14	Max Zhang	7 ft 3 in (2.21 m)	225 lb (102 kg)	RS Fr	Yantai City, China
F	21	Omondi Amoke	6 ft 7 in (2.01 m)	215 lb (98 kg)	RS Fr	Oxnard, California
G	22	Eddie Miller (W)	6 ft 5 in (1.96 m)	190 lb (86 kg)	So	Antioch, California
G	23	Patrick Christopher	6 ft 5 in (1.96 m)	215 lb (98 kg)	Jr	Compton, California
F	24	Theo Robertson	6 ft 6 in (1.98 m)	225 lb (102 kg)	RS Jr	Pittsburgh, California
C	32	Taylor Harrison	6 ft 10 in (2.08 m)	220 lb (100 kg)	RS So	San Clemente, California
C	33	Jordan Wilkes	7 ft 0 in (2.13 m)	225 lb (102 kg)	RS Jr	Los Angeles, California
F	43	Harper Kamp	6 ft 8 in (2.03 m)	255 lb (116 kg)	So	Mesa, Arizona

Head coach

- Mike Montgomery

Assistant coach(es)

- Travis DeCuire
- Gregg Gottlieb
- Jay John

Legend

- (C) Team captain
- (S) Suspended
- (I) Ineligible
- (W) Walk-on
- Injured
- Current redshirt

Roster
Last update: 13 March 2025

== Schedule and results ==
Date time, TV	Rank^{#}	Opponent^{#}	Result	Record	Site (attendance) city, state
Non-conference regular season
Nov 15, 2008*		Pacific	W 68–56	1–0	Haas Pavilion; Berkeley, California
Nov 18, 2008*		San Francisco	W 87–74	2–0	Haas Pavilion; Berkeley, California
Nov 20, 2008*		Texas–Pan American	W 85–58	3–0	Haas Pavilion; Berkeley, California
Nov 24, 2008*		North Carolina A&T	W 82–47	4–0	Haas Pavilion; Berkeley, California
Nov 28, 2008*		at UNLV	W 73–55	5–0	Thomas & Mack Center; Paradise, Nevada
Nov 29, 2008*		vs. Florida State	L 77–80	5–1	Thomas & Mack Center; Paradise, Nevada
Dec 3, 2008*; CSN California		DePaul	W 77–67	6–1	Haas Pavilion; Berkeley, California
Dec 7, 2008*; ESPNU		at Missouri	L 66–93	6–2	Mizzou Arena; Columbia, Missouri
Dec 10, 2008*		at Utah	W 72–69	7–2	Jon M. Huntsman Center; Salt Lake City, Utah
Dec 20, 2008*; CSN Bay Area Plus		Nevada	W 75–66	8–2	Haas Pavilion; Berkeley, California
Dec 22, 2008*		Colgate	W 83–48	9–2	Haas Pavilion; Berkeley, California
Dec 27, 2008*		Dartmouth	W 98–62	10–2	Haas Pavilion; Berkeley, California
Dec 28, 2008*		Portland	W 81–61	11–2	Haas Pavilion; Berkeley, California
Pac-10 regular season
Jan 2, 2009; CSN California		Arizona	W 69–55	12–2 (1–0)	Haas Pavilion; Berkeley, California
Jan 4, 2009; CSN California		No. 17 Arizona State	W 81–71	13–2 (2–0)	Haas Pavilion; Berkeley, California
Jan 8, 2009		at Washington State	W 57–50	14–2 (3–0)	Friel Court; Pullman, Washington
Jan 10, 2009; CSN California		at Washington	W 88–85 ^{3OT}	15–2 (4–0)	Bank of America Arena; Seattle, Washington
Jan 17, 2009; CSN Bay Area	No. 22	at Stanford	L 69–75	15–3 (4–1)	Maples Pavilion; Stanford, California
Jan 22, 2009		Oregon State	L 65–69	15–4 (4–2)	Haas Pavilion; Berkeley, California
Jan 24, 2009; CSN California		Oregon	W 76–69	16–4 (5–2)	Haas Pavilion; Berkeley, California
Jan 29, 2009; FSN		at No. 17 UCLA	L 66–81	16–5 (5–3)	Pauley Pavilion; Los Angeles, California
Jan 31, 2009; FSN		at USC	L 62–73	16–6 (5–4)	Galen Center; Los Angeles, California
Feb 5, 2009		No. 22 Washington	W 86–71	17–6 (6–4)	Haas Pavilion; Berkeley, California
Feb 7, 2009; FSN		Washington State	W 71–63	18–6 (7–4)	Haas Pavilion; Berkeley, California
Feb 14, 2009; FSN		Stanford	W 82–75	19–6 (8–4)	Haas Pavilion; Berkeley, California
Feb 19, 2009; CSN California		at Oregon	W 78–60	20–6 (9–4)	McArthur Court; Eugene, Oregon
Feb 21, 2009		at Oregon State	L 54–65	20–7 (9–5)	Gill Coliseum; Corvallis, Oregon
Feb 26, 2009; CSN California		USC	W 81–78 ^{OT}	21–7 (10–5)	Haas Pavilion; Berkeley, California
Feb 28, 2009; ESPN		No. 22 UCLA	L 68–72	21–8 (10–6)	Haas Pavilion; Berkeley, California
Mar 5, 2009; FSN		at Arizona	W 83–77	22–8 (11–6)	McKale Center; Tucson, Arizona
Mar 7, 2009; CBS		at No. 21 Arizona State	L 66–83	22–9 (11–7)	Wells Fargo Arena; Tempe, Arizona
Pac-10 tournament
Mar 12, 2009*; FSN	(3)	vs. (6) USC; Quarterfinals	L 75–79	22–10	Staples Center; Los Angeles, California
NCAA tournament
Mar 19, 2009*; CBS	(7 W)	vs. (10 W) Maryland; First Round	L 71–84	22–11	Sprint Center; Kansas City, Missouri
*Non-conference game. ^{#}Rankings from AP poll. (#) Tournament seedings in parentheses. W=West. All times are in Pacific.

== Rankings ==
Ranking movements Legend: ██ Increase in ranking ██ Decrease in ranking — = Not ranked RV = Received votes
	Week																			
Poll	Pre	1	2	3	4	5	6	7	8	9	10	11	12	13	14	15	16	17	18	Final
AP	—	—	—	—	—	—	—	—	RV	22	RV	RV	—	RV	RV	RV	RV	RV	—	
Coaches	—	—	—	—	—	—	—	—	RV	22	RV	RV	—	RV	RV	RV	RV	RV	—	
