= 2009 College Basketball Invitational =

College basketball tournament

- Teams: 16
- Finals site: Gill Coliseum; Don Haskins Center; Corvallis, Oregon; El Paso, Texas
- Champions: Oregon State Beavers (1st title)
- Runner-up: UTEP Miners (1st title game)
- Semifinalists: Richmond Spiders (1st semifinal); Stanford Cardinal (1st semifinal)
- Winning coach: Craig Robinson (1st title)
- MVP: Roeland Schaftenaar (Oregon State)

The 2009 College Basketball Invitational (CBI) was a single-elimination tournament of 16 National Collegiate Athletic Association (NCAA) Division I teams that did not participate in the 2009 NCAA Men's Division I Basketball Tournament or the 2009 National Invitation Tournament. The opening round began Tuesday, March 17. A best-of-three championship series between Oregon State and UTEP resulted in an Oregon State victory on April 3. The 2009 CBI marked the first ever postseason tournament championship for Oregon State as well as a successful conclusion to head coach Craig Robinson's first year. The Beavers were honored with a visit to the White House with president Barack Obama; Robinson is the brother of First Lady Michelle Obama.

== Participants ==
=== Round 1 away teams ===
School	Conference	Overall record	Conference record
Boise State	Western Athletic	19–12	9–7
Buffalo	Mid-American	21–11	11–5
UTEP	Conference USA	19–12	10–6
Northeastern	Colonial Athletic	18–12	12–6
Houston	Conference USA	21–11	10–6
Vermont	America East	23–9	13–3
St. John's	Big East	16–17	6–12
Charleston	Southern	26–8	15–5

=== Round 1 home teams ===
School	Conference	Overall record	Conference record
Stanford	Pacific-10	18–13	6–12
Wichita State	Missouri Valley	16–16	8–10
Nevada	Western Athletic	21–12	11–5
Wyoming	Mountain West	19–13	7–9
Oregon State	Pacific-10	13–17	7–11
UW-Green Bay	Horizon	22–10	13–5
Richmond	Atlantic 10	18–15	9–7
Troy	Sun Belt	19–12	14–4

== Bracket ==
The bracket for the 2009 College Basketball Invitational was announced on March 15, 2009.

First round March 17–18
E1	Richmond	75
E4	Saint John's	69
E2	Troy	91
E3	Charleston	93
S1	Nevada	77
S4	UTEP	79
S2	Wyoming	62
S3	Northeastern	64
W1	Oregon State	49
W4	Houston	45
W2	UW-Green Bay	72
W3	Vermont	76
M1	Stanford	96
M4	Boise State	76
M2	Wichita State	84
M3	Buffalo	73

Quarterfinals; March 23
E1	Richmond	74
E3	Charleston	72
S4	UTEP	75
S3	Northeastern	66
W1	Oregon State	71*
W3	Vermont	70
M1	Stanford	70
M2	Wichita State	56

Semifinals (Reseeded); March 25
1	Richmond	69
4	UTEP	81
2	Oregon State	65*
3	Stanford	62

Finals (Best of three); March 30, April 1, 3
4	UTEP	69	70	73
2	Oregon State	75	63	81

* Denotes overtime period.
