= Big 12/Pac-10 Hardwood Series =

- Conference: Pac-10 Conference; Big 12 Conference
- League: NCAA Division I
- Founded: 2007
- Folded: 2010
- Sports fielded: College basketball
- Last champion: Big 12 Conference
- Most titles: Big 12 Conference (2)
- Broadcaster: ESPN, ESPN2, ESPNU

The Big 12/Pac-10 Hardwood Series was a four-year series of NCAA Division I men's college basketball games matching teams from the Big 12 Conference and the Pac-10 Conference. Started in 2007 and concluding in 2010, it was primarily a way to guarantee top flight competition for both conferences and garner more recognition for the level of play of both leagues in basketball. This series mirrored the ACC–Big Ten Challenge. There was a "designated" four-day window for the main part of the series matchups and a few other matchups in November and late December. Because there were more teams in the Big 12 at the time, two teams from the Pac-10 played twice against Big 12 teams. The Pac-10 had a slight advantage on the national stage. UCLA (University of California Los Angeles) has 11 national championships, University of Arizona in 1997 & University of Oregon in 1939. The series originally had a 4-year contract which was not renewed by the conferences in 2010, bringing an end to the series. The series was brought back in a limited fashion in 2021 as the Pac-12 Coast-to-Coast Challenge.

== Results ==
=== 2007 ===
The Pac-10 Conference won the initial installment in 2007 7–5.

Big 12 team	Pac-10 team	Date	Outcome	Location	B12	P10
Kansas	Arizona	November 25	KU 76–72 (OT)	Lawrence, KS	X	
Kansas State	Oregon	November 29	UO 80–77	Manhattan, KS		X
Oklahoma	Southern California	November 29	USC 66–55	Los Angeles		X
Baylor	Washington State	November 30	WSU 67–64	Waco, TX		X
Iowa State	Oregon State	November 30	ISU 71–64 (OT)	Corvallis, OR	X	
Oklahoma State	Washington	December 1	OSU 96–71	Stillwater, OK	X	
Missouri	California	December 1	UC 86–72	Berkeley, CA		X
Nebraska	Arizona State	December 2	NU 62–47	Lincoln, NE	X	
Colorado	Stanford	December 2	SU 67–43	Boulder, CO		X
Texas A&M	Arizona	December 2	UA 78–67	Tucson, AZ		X
Texas	UCLA	December 2	UT 63–61	Los Angeles	X	
Texas Tech	Stanford	December 22	SU 62–61	Dallas, TX		X
Result			Pac-10		5	7

Notes: Arizona and Stanford played twice in the series this year.

- On November 21, 2007, Texas A&M defeated Washington 77–63 in New York City as part of the NIT Season Tip Off.
- On December 2, 2007, Kansas defeated Southern California 59–55 in Los Angeles; the game was not organized as part of the Series.
- On December 9, 2007, Kansas State defeated California 82–75 in Manhattan; the game was not organized as part of the Series.
- On December 15, 2007, Nebraska defeated Oregon 88–79 in Omaha; the game was not organized as part of the Series.

=== 2008 ===
In 2008, before the series "officially" tipped off on December 4, the Big 12 was 4–1 versus the Pac-10 in neutral court matchups.

Big 12 team	Pac-10 team	Date	Outcome	Location	B12	P10
Colorado	Stanford	November 29	SU 76–62	Palo Alto, CA		X
Oklahoma	Southern California	December 4	OU 73–72	Norman, OK	X	
Texas	UCLA	December 4	UT 68–64	Austin, TX	X	
Oklahoma State	Washington	December 4	UW 83–65	Seattle, WA		X
Texas A&M	Arizona	December 5	A&M 67–66	College Station, TX	X	
Iowa State	Oregon State	December 6	ISU 63–50	Ames, IA	X	
Baylor	Washington State	December 6	BU 58–52	Pullman, WA	X	
Missouri	California	December 7	MU 93–66	Columbia, MO	X	
Nebraska	Arizona State	December 7	ASU 64–44	Tempe, AZ		X
Kansas State	Oregon	December 7	UO 75–70	Eugene, OR		X
Kansas	Arizona	December 23	UA 84–67	Tucson, AZ		X
Texas Tech	Stanford	December 28	SU 111–66	Palo Alto, CA		X
Result			Tie		6	6

Notes: Arizona and Stanford played twice in the series this year.

- On November 23, 2008, Missouri defeated Southern California 83–72 in San Juan, Puerto Rico as part of the O'Reilly Auto Parts Puerto Rico Tip Off.
- On November 24, 2008, Kansas defeated Washington 73–54 in Kansas City as part of the College Basketball Experience Classic.
- On November 26, 2008, Texas defeated Oregon 70–57 in Maui as part of the EA Sports Maui Invitational.
- On November 29, 2008, Baylor defeated Arizona State 87–78 in Anaheim as part of the 76 Classic.
- On December 13, 2008, Oregon State defeated Nebraska 64–63 in Corvallis; the game was not organized as part of the Series.

=== 2009 ===
Big 12 team	Pac-10 team	Date	Outcome	Location	B12	P10
Nebraska	Southern California	November 29	NU 51–48	Los Angeles	X	
Texas Tech	Washington	December 3	TTU 99–92	Lubbock, TX	X	
Texas	Southern California	December 3	UT 69–50	Austin, TX	X	
Baylor	Arizona State	December 3	BU 64–61	Tempe, AZ	X	
Colorado	Oregon State	December 4	OSU 74–69	Corvallis, OR		X
Missouri	Oregon	December 5	MU 106–69	Columbia, MO	X	
Iowa State	California	December 5	UC 82–63	Berkeley, CA		X
Kansas State	Washington State	December 5	KSU 86–69	Manhattan, KS	X	
Kansas	UCLA	December 6	KU 73–61	Los Angeles	X	
Oklahoma	Arizona	December 6	OU 79–62	Norman, OK	X	
Oklahoma State	Stanford	December 16	OSU 71–70	Palo Alto, CA	X	
Texas A&M	Washington	December 22	UW 73–64	Seattle, WA		X
Result			Big 12		9	3

Notes: Southern California and Washington played twice in the series this year.

- On November 15, 2009, Texas Tech defeated Oregon State 64–60 in Lubbock; the game was not organized as part of the Series.
- On November 24, 2009, Arizona defeated Colorado 91–87 in Maui as part of the EA Sports Maui Invitational.
- On December 12, 2009, Nebraska defeated Oregon State 50–44 in Lincoln; the game was not organized as part of the Series.
- On December 22, 2009, Kansas defeated California 84–69 in Lawrence; the game was not organized as part of the Series.

=== 2010 ===
Big 12 team	Pac-10 team	Date	Outcome	Location	B12	P10
Nebraska	Southern California	November 27	NU 60–58	Lincoln, NE	X	
Missouri	Oregon	December 2	MU 83–80	Eugene, OR	X	
Kansas	UCLA	December 2	KU 77–76	Lawrence, KS	X	
Baylor	Arizona State	December 2	BU 68–54	Waco, TX	X	
Kansas State	Washington State	December 3	KSU 63–58	Pullman, WA	X	
Colorado	Oregon State	December 4	CU 83–57	Boulder, CO	X	
Iowa State	California	December 4	UC 76–73	Ames, IA		X
Texas Tech	Washington	December 4	UW 108–79	Seattle, WA		X
Texas	Southern California	December 5	USC 73–56	Los Angeles		X
Oklahoma	Arizona	December 5	AZ 83–60	Tucson, AZ		X
Texas A&M	Washington	December 11	TAM 63–62	College Station, TX	X	
Oklahoma State	Stanford	December 21	OSU 79–68	Stillwater, OK	X	
Result			Big 12		8	4

Notes: Southern California and Washington played twice in the Series this year.

- On November 27, 2010, Kansas defeated Arizona 87–79 in Las Vegas as part of the Las Vegas Invitational.
- On December 18, 2010, Kansas defeated Southern California 70–68 in Lawrence; the game was not organized as part of the Series.
- On December 22, 2010, Kansas defeated California 78–63 in Berkeley; this game is not organized as part of the Series.

== Team records ==
=== Big 12 Conference (2–1–1) ===
Institution	Wins	Loss
Baylor Bears	3	1
Colorado Buffaloes	1	3
Iowa State Cyclones	2	2
Kansas Jayhawks	3	1
Kansas State Wildcats	2	2
Missouri Tigers	3	1
Nebraska Cornhuskers	3	1
Oklahoma Sooners	2	2
Oklahoma State Cowboys	3	1
Texas Longhorns	3	1
Texas A&M Aggies	2	2
Texas Tech Red Raiders	1	3
Overall	28	20

=== Pac-10 Conference (1–2–1) ===
Institution	Wins	Loss
Arizona Wildcats	3	3
Arizona State Sun Devils	1	3
California Golden Bears	3	1
Oregon Ducks	2	2
Oregon State Beavers	1	3
Stanford Cardinal	4	2
UCLA Bruins	0	4
USC Trojans	2	4
Washington Huskies	3	3
Washington State Cougars	1	3
Overall	20	28
