= Zoom Diallo =

American basketball player (born 2005)

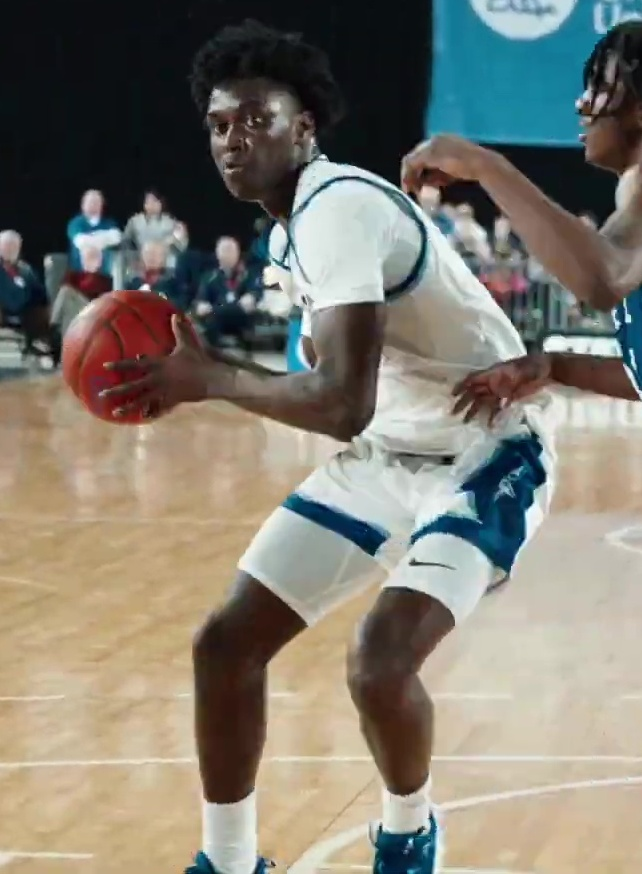
- Diallo with Curtis Senior High

No. 5 – Kentucky Wildcats
- Position: Point guard / shooting guard
- Conference: Southeastern Conference

Personal information
- Born: November 2, 2005 (age 21)
- Listed height: 6 ft 6 in (1.98 m)
- Listed weight: 195 lb (88 kg)

Career information
- High school: Curtis Senior (University Place, Washington); Prolific Prep (Napa, California)
- College: Washington (2024–2026); Kentucky (2026–present)

Career highlights
- McDonald's All-American (2024); Nike Hoop Summit (2024)

Vazoumana "Zoom" Diallo (born November 2, 2005) is an Ivorian-American college basketball player for the Kentucky Wildcats of the Southeastern Conference (SEC). He previously played for the Washington Huskies.

== Early life and high school career ==
Diallo grew up in Tacoma, Washington, and initially attended Curtis Senior High School. He was named the Washington Gatorade Player of the Year as a junior after averaging 20.2 points, 5.5 assists, 4.4 rebounds, and 1.3 steals per game. Diallo transferred to Prolific Prep in Napa, California prior to the start of his senior year. Diallo was selected to play in the 2024 McDonald's All-American Boys Game during his senior year. He participated in the 2024 Nike Hoop Summit.

=== Recruiting ===
Diallo is considered a top-30 prospect in the 2024 class. He committed to play college basketball at Washington after considering offers from Arizona, Gonzaga and USC.

== College career ==
Diallo averaged 11.1 points, 3.7 rebounds, and 2.1 assists per game as a freshman at Washington. He averaged 15.7 points, 3.9 rebounds and 4.5 assists per game as a sophomore. Following the season, he transferred to Kentucky.

== Personal life ==
Diallo was born in the United States to Ivorian parents, and holds dual American and Ivorian citizenship.
