= List of killings by law enforcement officers in the United States, September 2011 =

This is a list of people reported killed by non-military law enforcement officers in the United States in September 2011, whether in the line of duty or not, and regardless of reason or method. The listing documents the occurrence of a death, making no implications regarding wrongdoing or justification on the part of the person killed or officer involved. Killings are arranged by date of the incident that caused death. Different death dates, if known, are noted in the description. The table below lists 31 people.

== September 2011 ==
Date	Name (Age) of Deceased	State (city)	Description
2011-09-29	Javier, Starling (21)	Florida (Fort Myers)	
2011-09-29	Blackmon, Jerome	Colorado (Aurora)	Shot after pointing a handgun at police. Police were responding to a report of a man and woman arguing in the street. Blackmon fled from police and Taser was ineffective.
2011-09-26	Speakman, Jared (18)	Florida (St. Petersburg)	
2011-09-26	James Rogers (45)	Washington (Spokane)	Shot after two-hour standoff with police and pointing shotgun at police. Police were responding to report of suicidal man.
2011-09-24	Fritze, Paul	Maine (Farmingdale)	Shot after incident that lasted several hours that began when Fritze reported began shooting at occupants of house.
2011-09-24	Ficker, Ronald	Washington (Issaquah)	Shot after shooting near school and shooting at police.
2011-09-22	Deloatch, Barry	New Jersey (New Brunswick)	Deloatch was shot by an officer while struggling on the ground with a second officer. The officer who fired the fatal shot was found to be in violation of the departments equipment policy by not having Oleoresin Capiscum (O.C.) spray on him. The officer resigned from the department following the internal investigation.
2011-09-20	Edwards, Alnur	Georgia (Norcross)	Shot during shootout with police following bank robbery, car jacking and chase.
2011-09-18	Martin, Kenneth Dwayne	Georgia (Jefferson)	Shot after ignoring deputy commands and setting room on fire. Police were responding to report that Martin threatened to set his wife on fire. Martin had doused her and their home with gasoline.
2011-09-17	Moore, Jason (31)	Missouri (Ferguson)	Shot three times with a Taser and died. Family told media he had a mental illness. Civil suit was filed by his family in Federal court in 2014.
2011-09-15	Neel, Dale	Washington (Fircrest)	Died after being struck by police cruiser. The 62-year-old man was in the center turn lane on a moped. A deputy was responding to a call for backup from another deputy who was searching for people who had fled a traffic stop. The responding deputy was traveling in the center turn lane.
2011-09-14	Larry Adams (41)	South Carolina (York)	
2011-09-13	Vargas, Christen	Colorado (Colorado Springs)	Shot after driving over a deputies foot and fleeing in vehicle. Deputies had approached vehicle in parking lot while looking for a different person with an outstanding warrant. A deputy shot at the vehicle as it sped away.
2011-09-11	Wolford, William	Colorado (Pueblo)	Died from injuries sustained when struck by police cruiser. Officer was stopped at red light and struck Wolford as he crossed intersection at crosswalk. Officer was initially cited for careless driving causing bodily injury.
2011-9-11	Roger DeGhetto (38)	Pennsylvania (Catawissa)	
2011-09-10	Rodriguez-Gallo, Jose (54)	Florida (Winter Park)	
2011-09-09	Hull, Marc (25)	Nevada (Las Vegas)	Hull was shot to death after shooting and injuring a police officer inside a Walmart store where he was trying to purchase $5000 worth of electronics with a credit card that was being declined.
2011-09-08	Victor Medina (48)	Iowa (Davenport)	
2011-09-07	Unnamed woman (23)	Alabama (Irondale)	
2011-09-07	Unnamed man	Massachusetts (Rockland)	
2011-09-07	Bruce, Jasmen	Georgia (Atlanta)	Shot while burglarizing the home of an Atlanta police officer.
2011-09-06	Jimenez, Heriberto (42)	Florida (Melbourne)	
2011-09-06	Collado, John (43)	New York (New York)	Collado, who was unarmed, was shot when he intervened in a fight between 2 men on the street. Unknown to Collado, the fight was actually an attempted marijuana arrest by NYPD plainclothes detective James Connolly, a cop for 5 years, who had abandoned his NYPD narcotics team to attempt this arrest alone. Collado died hours later. At civil trial in 2018, a jury unanimously found that Connolly used excessive force when he shot Collado and delivered a verdict against him including substantial punitive damages. Collado is the second person killed by Connolly while on duty. Connolly killed another man while he was alone and in plainclothes in 2009 with 3 years on the job.
2011-09-06	Tolbert, Alranhiem; Carr, Tony	Georgia (Columbus)	Shot as vehicle backed up towards officer. The officer had observed a masked man run out of a credit union. Tolbert ran to a truck in which Carr was sitting in the passenger side.
2011-09-05	Peterson, Walter	Georgia (Moultrie)	Shot after attempting to stab a police officer. Police had gone to Peterson's home to investigate a report of a broken window at a local store. Police unsuccessfully used a Taser before firing the fatal shot.
2011-09-04	Connor, Tammy (51)	Arizona (Yavapai County)	
2011-09-04	Bonnee, William (30)	Arizona (Mohave County)	
2011-09-02	Short, William (38)	Arizona (Maricopa County)	
2011-09-01	Bishop, Tiffany	Georgia (Jackson)	Shot accidentally by instructor during firearms training class. Bishop was attending the class as a probation officer for the Georgia Diagnostic Prison in Jackson.
2011-09-01	Unnamed man	Florida (North Miami Beach)	
2011-09-01	Jason Pannell (28)	Tennessee (Knoxville)	

== See also ==
- Death in custody § United States
- Henry A. Wallace Police Crime Public Database
- List of cases of police brutality
- List of countries with annual rates and counts for killings by law enforcement officers
- List of law enforcement officers killed in the line of duty in the United States
- List of law enforcement officers convicted for an on-duty killing in the United States
- List of shootings by US immigration agents
- List of police reforms related to the George Floyd protests
- List of unarmed African Americans killed by law enforcement officers in the United States
- Lists of killings by law enforcement officers
- Police brutality in the United States
- Police misconduct § United States
- Police riot § United States
- Police use of deadly force in the United States
