= Singor Mobley =

American gridiron football player (born 1972)

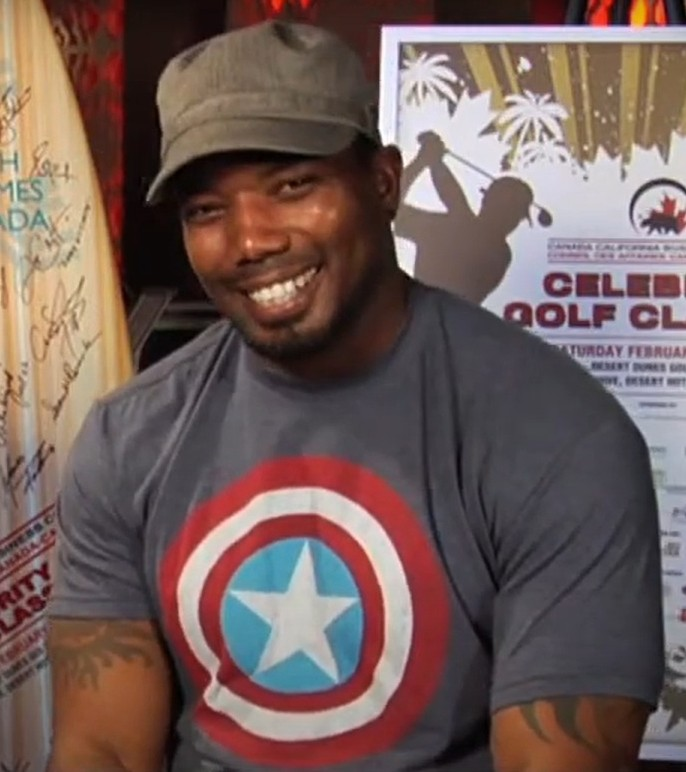
- Mobley in 2012

No. 27
- Positions: Safety, Linebacker

Personal information
- Born: October 12, 1972 (age 54); Tacoma, Washington, U.S.
- Listed height: 5 ft 11 in (1.80 m)
- Listed weight: 195 lb (88 kg)

Career information
- High school: Curtis Senior (University Place, Washington)
- College: Washington State
- NFL draft: 1995: undrafted

Career history
- 1995–1996: Edmonton Eskimos
- 1997–1999: Dallas Cowboys
- 2000–2006: Edmonton Eskimos

Awards and highlights
- 2× Grey Cup champion (2003, 2005); Second-team All-Pac-10 (1994)
- Stats at Pro Football Reference
- Stats at CFL.ca (archive)

Singor A. Mobley (born October 12, 1972) is an American former professional football player who was a safety and linebacker in the National Football League (NFL) and Canadian Football League (CFL), for the Dallas Cowboys and Edmonton Eskimos. He played college football for the Washington State Cougars

== Early life ==
Born and raised in Tacoma, Washington, Mobley attended Curtis Senior High School in University Place, where he was a two-way player as a running back and defensive back. As a junior, he rushed for 1,147 yards and 13 touchdowns.

As a senior in the fall of 1990, he finished with 1,579 yards and 16 touchdowns, South Puget Sound League MVP-defensive back, co-MVP-running back and Class AAA All-state honors at both positions. He contributed to his team winning two consecutive state titles, and competed in track.

== College career ==
Mobley accepted a football scholarship to Washington State University in Pullman, Washington, where he was a four-year starter at strong safety under Cougars head coach Mike Price. He also was used as a kickoff returner in some situations.

As a freshman in 1991, he collected 33 tackles, one interception and one forced fumble. As a sophomore in 1992, he had 75 tackles (fourth on the team), 3 tackles for loss, 4 passes defensed, one interception, one forced fumble and one fumble recovery. The Cougars won the Apple Cup in the snow in Pullman and the Copper Bowl in Tucson, Arizona.

In 1993, he registered 63 tackles (tied for third on the team), 4 tackles for loss, 2 interceptions, 3 passes defensed, 2 sacks and 2 forced fumbles. As a senior in 1994, he recorded 55 tackles (sixth on the team), 1.5 tackles for loss, 5 passes defensed, one fumble recovery and one forced fumble.

== Professional career ==
=== Edmonton Eskimos (first stint) ===
Unselected in the 1995 NFL draft, Mobley signed with the Edmonton Eskimos of the CFL. He had 58 tackles (3 for loss), 3 fumble recoveries and one sack. In 1996, he posted 72 tackles (3 for loss), 5 sacks, one interception and one fumble recovery.

=== Dallas Cowboys ===
On February 12, 1997, he was signed as an undrafted free agent by the Dallas Cowboys, reuniting with former Cougars defensive coordinator Mike Zimmer, who was the team's defensive backs coach. He was one of thirteen rookies to make the team. He was declared inactive in four of the first 5 games. He finished seventh on the team with 11 special teams tackles. In 1998, he was sixth on the team with 10 special teams tackles.

He spent three seasons with the Cowboys as a backup safety and special teams player. He wasn't re-signed at the end of the 1999 season.

=== Edmonton Eskimos (second stint) ===
On May 23, 2000, Mobley was signed by the Edmonton Eskimos and was switched to linebacker. He led the team in tackles in 2004 (75) and 2005 (74).

In 2006, he was second on the team with 59 tackles. He was released after the season and announced his retirement on May 24, 2007.

In all, Mobley played 158 games over nine seasons with the Eskimos, was a part of two Grey Cup championship teams, registered 602 tackles (21 for loss), 21 sacks, 24 passes defensed, 15 interceptions and 78 special teams tackles. In 1995, he set a team record with 129 yards in fumble recoveries. He is considered to be one of the greatest defensive players in franchise history.

=== Alaska Airlines ===
Mobley lists Lead Customer Service Agent in his LinkedIn profile.

== Personal life ==
Mobley is the secondary coach at Curtis High School, south of Tacoma.
