= Cindy Brunson =

Sports anchor and reporter

Cindy Brunson is a sports anchor and reporter. She is currently working as part of the Pac-12 Networks broadcast team as a football and men's basketball sideline reporter and women's basketball play-by-play announcer.

== Biography ==
Brunson graduated from Curtis Senior High School in University Place, Washington. She is a 1996 alumna of Washington State University, with a Bachelor of Arts degree in broadcast communications.

=== Broadcasting career ===
Brunson joined ESPN as an ESPNEWS anchor in September 1999. She served as co-host alongside David Lloyd on the network's weekend morning SportsCenter programs. Prior to ESPN, Brunson served as a weekend sports and news anchor/reporter at KATU in Portland, Oregon, from July 1998 to August 1999. While in Portland, she covered the Portland Trail Blazers, the University of Oregon and Oregon State University football, and men's and women's basketball programs.

Prior to KATU, Brunson worked at KHQ-TV in Spokane, Washington.

Brunson was anchoring when ESPNEWS covered Florida Marlins rookie Aníbal Sánchez's no-hitter, thrown September 6, 2006. She was also anchoring SportsCenter when San Francisco Giants slugger Barry Bonds hit his 755th and 756th career home runs, tying and surpassing Hank Aaron for most all-time.

Brunson officially left ESPN on December 29, 2012, after co-anchoring her final SportsCenter broadcast alongside Bram Weinstein. She co-anchored her first SportsCenter broadcast in February 2001 alongside her future husband, Steve Berthiaume.

Brunson joined the Arizona Diamondbacks broadcast team in March 2013. She co-hosted pre-game and post-game shows with Jody Jackson on Sunday games. By 2024, she was the play-by-play voice of the Phoenix Mercury and a studio host at ESPN and the Pac-12 Network. In 2025, she was released from the Mercury.
