= Brian J. Sullivan =

Brian J. Sullivan may refer to:

- Brian Sullivan (district attorney) (1966–2014), politician from Tacoma, Washington
- Brian Sullivan (Washington politician, born 1958), politician from Snohomish County, Washington
