= Isaiah Thomas (basketball) =

American basketball player (born 1989)

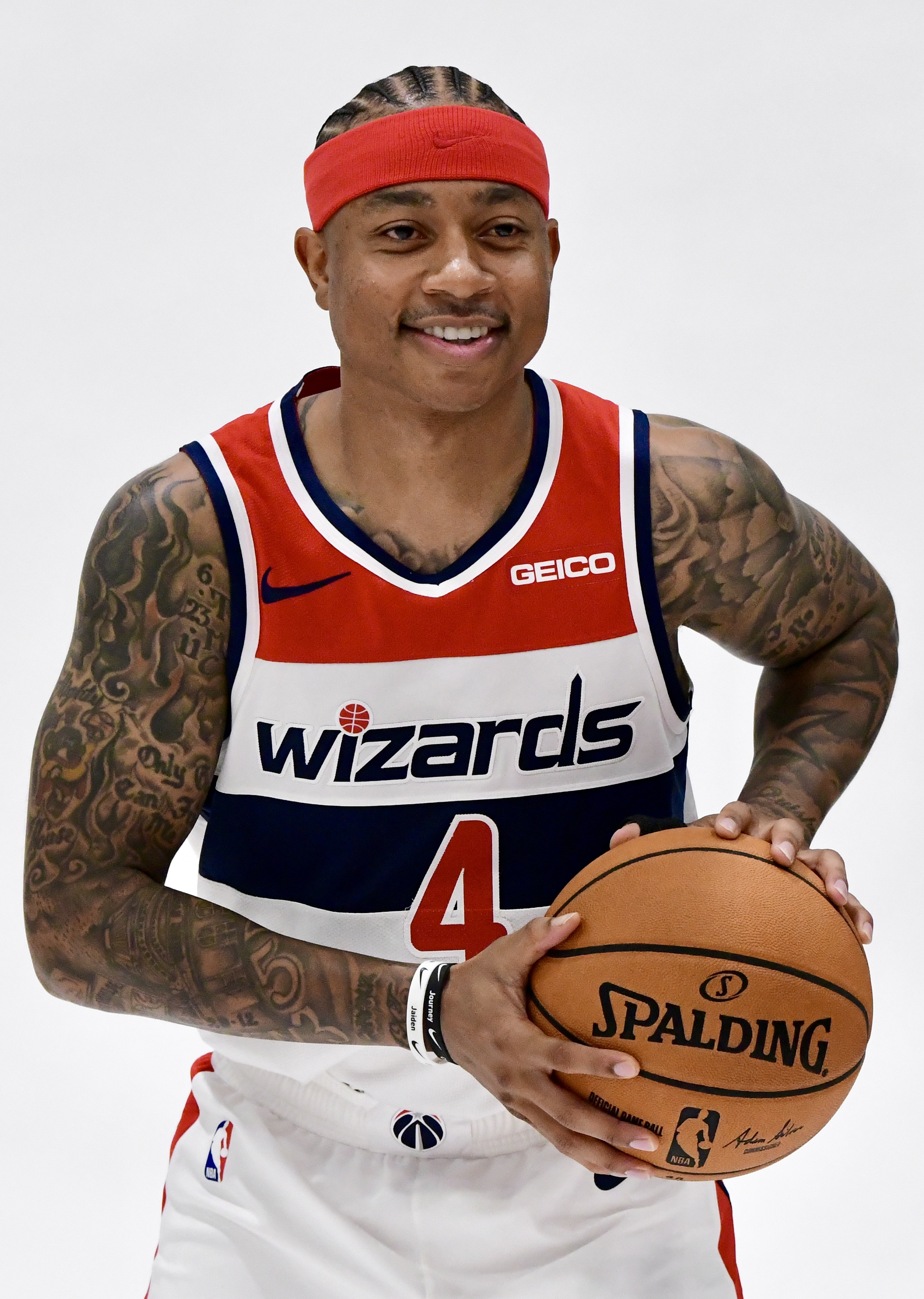
- Thomas with the Washington Wizards in 2019

Boston Celtics
- Title: Scout
- League: NBA

Personal information
- Born: February 7, 1989 (age 37) Tacoma, Washington, U.S.
- Listed height: 5 ft 9 in (1.75 m)
- Listed weight: 185 lb (84 kg)

Career information
- High school: Curtis (University Place, Washington); South Kent School (South Kent, Connecticut)
- College: Washington (2008–2011)
- NBA draft: 2011: 2nd round, 60th overall pick
- Drafted by: Sacramento Kings
- Playing career: 2011–2025
- Position: Point guard
- Number: 22, 3, 4, 7, 0, 24, 31, 2

Career history
- 2011–2014: Sacramento Kings
- 2014–2015: Phoenix Suns
- 2015–2017: Boston Celtics
- 2017–2018: Cleveland Cavaliers
- 2018: Los Angeles Lakers
- 2018–2019: Denver Nuggets
- 2019–2020: Washington Wizards
- 2021: New Orleans Pelicans
- 2021: Grand Rapids Gold
- 2021: Los Angeles Lakers
- 2021–2022: Dallas Mavericks
- 2022: Grand Rapids Gold
- 2022: Charlotte Hornets
- 2024: Salt Lake City Stars
- 2024: Phoenix Suns
- 2025: Salt Lake City Stars

Career highlights
- 2× NBA All-Star (2016, 2017); All-NBA Second Team (2017); NBA All-Rookie Second Team (2012); AP honorable mention All-American (2011); 2× First-team All-Pac-10 (2010, 2011); Second-team All-Pac-10 (2009); 2× Pac-10 tournament MVP (2010, 2011); Pac-10 Freshman of the Year (2009); No. 2 retired by Washington Huskies; Washington Huskies Athletics Hall of Fame (2023)
- Stats at NBA.com
- Stats at Basketball Reference

Isaiah Jamar Thomas (born February 7, 1989) is an American former professional basketball player who is working as a scout for the Boston Celtics of the National Basketball Association (NBA). He is best known for playing with the Celtics from 2015 through 2017, where he was a two-time NBA All-Star and named second-team All-NBA. The 5-foot-9-inch (1.75 m) point guard played three years of college basketball for the Washington Huskies and was a three-time all-conference selection in the Pac-10. After electing to forgo his senior year of college, Thomas was selected by the Sacramento Kings with the final pick in the 2011 NBA draft.

He spent three seasons with the Kings before joining the Phoenix Suns in 2014. Thomas was traded to Boston in February 2015. In the 2016–17 season, he led the Celtics to the first seed of the Eastern Conference, had the third-highest points-per-game average in the league, and finished fifth in MVP voting. After injuring his right hip during the 2016–17 season, Thomas was traded to the Cleveland Cavaliers in August 2017. Over the next several seasons, his hip injury significantly hampered his play. Thomas went on to play for the Los Angeles Lakers, Denver Nuggets, Washington Wizards, New Orleans Pelicans, Dallas Mavericks, Charlotte Hornets, and Suns again, along with several stints in the NBA G League.

== Early life ==
Isaiah Thomas was born on February 7, 1989 to James Thomas and Tina Baldtrip. A lifelong Los Angeles Lakers fan, James Thomas made a bet with a friend that if his beloved team did not defeat the Detroit Pistons in the 1989 NBA Finals, he would name his son after Pistons star and decorated Lakers nemesis Isiah Thomas. Thomas was born months before the finals took place but his father had warmed to the name and his mother consented on the condition that the Biblical spelling of Isaiah was utilized. Thomas was born and raised in Tacoma, Washington. As a child, he had the nicknames "Bighead" (or Head) from his father and "Zeke" (which was Isiah Thomas's nickname) from his mother.

== High school career ==
Thomas attended Curtis Senior High School in University Place, Washington, through 11th grade. As his grades had to improve to earn a scholarship, Thomas repeated his senior year across the country at South Kent School in South Kent, Connecticut. Thomas graduated from the Connecticut prep school in 2008. At Curtis High, playing for the varsity basketball team, Thomas had averaged 31.2 points per game as a junior. On April 20, 2006, he called a news briefing to announce his intention to sign with the University of Washington.

College recruiting
Name	Hometown	School	Height	Weight	Commit date
Isaiah Thomas; PG	South Kent, Connecticut	South Kent School	5 ft 8 in (1.73 m)	170 lb (77 kg)	Apr 19, 2006
Isaiah Thomas; PG	Recruit ratings: Scout: Rivals: 247Sports: (76)				
Overall recruit ranking: Scout: 2 (PG); 22 (school) Rivals: 14 (PG); 92 (national)
Note: In many cases, Scout, Rivals, 247Sports, On3, and ESPN may conflict in their listings of height and weight.; In these cases, the average was taken. ESPN grades are on a 100-point scale.; Sources: "2008 Washington Basketball Commitment List". Rivals.; "2008 Washington College Basketball Team Recruiting Prospects". Scout.; "Washington Huskies 2008 Player Commits". ESPN.; "Scout.com Team Recruiting Rankings". Scout.; "2008 Team Ranking". Rivals.

== College career ==
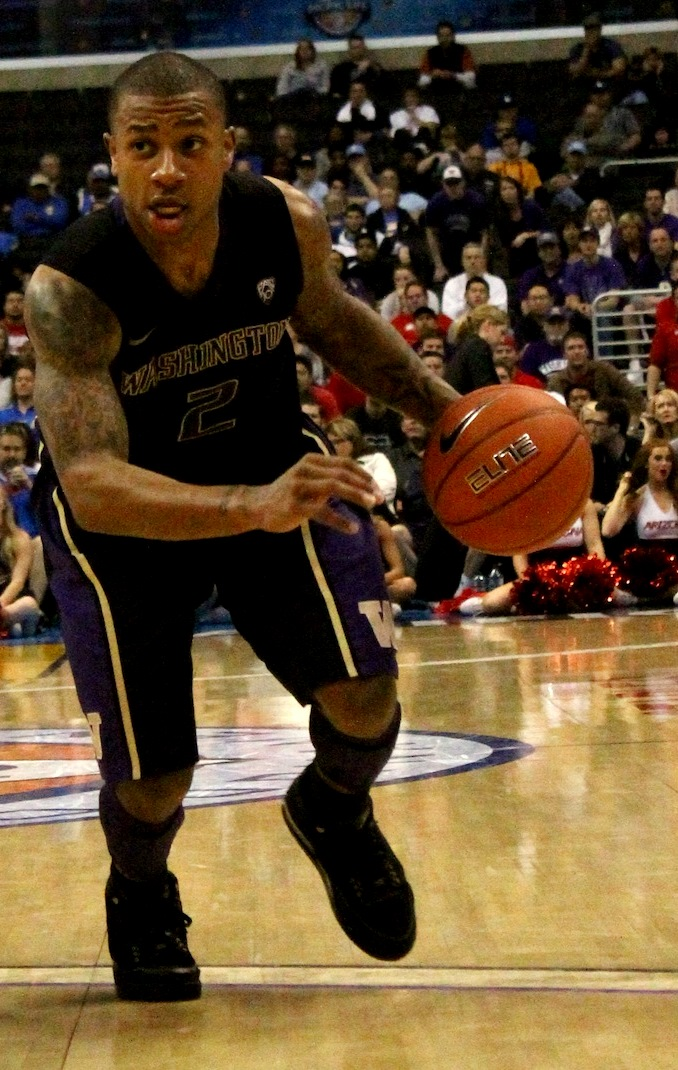
Thomas in 2011

Thomas received the blessing of Nate Robinson, the former Washington Huskies star, to wear his No. 2 jersey. Thomas scored a season-high 27 points in an 81–67 home victory over Morgan State on December 30, 2008.

Thomas averaged 15.5 points, 2.6 assists, and 3.0 rebounds per game as a true freshman. He was named Pac-10 Freshman of the Year and second-team All-Pac-10.

As a sophomore, Thomas' averages rose to 16.9 points, 3.2 assists, and 3.9 rebounds per game. He was named first-team All-Pac-10.

Thomas was again named first-team All-Pac-10 in his junior year. On March 12, 2011, Thomas scored 28 points and hit a game-winning buzzer beater in overtime to lead the Huskies to victory over Arizona in the championship game of the Pac-10 tournament. He was among the final ten candidates for the Bob Cousy Award in his junior season. A few weeks later on March 31, Thomas declared for the NBA draft, forgoing his final year of college eligibility.

== Professional career ==
=== Sacramento Kings (2011–2014) ===
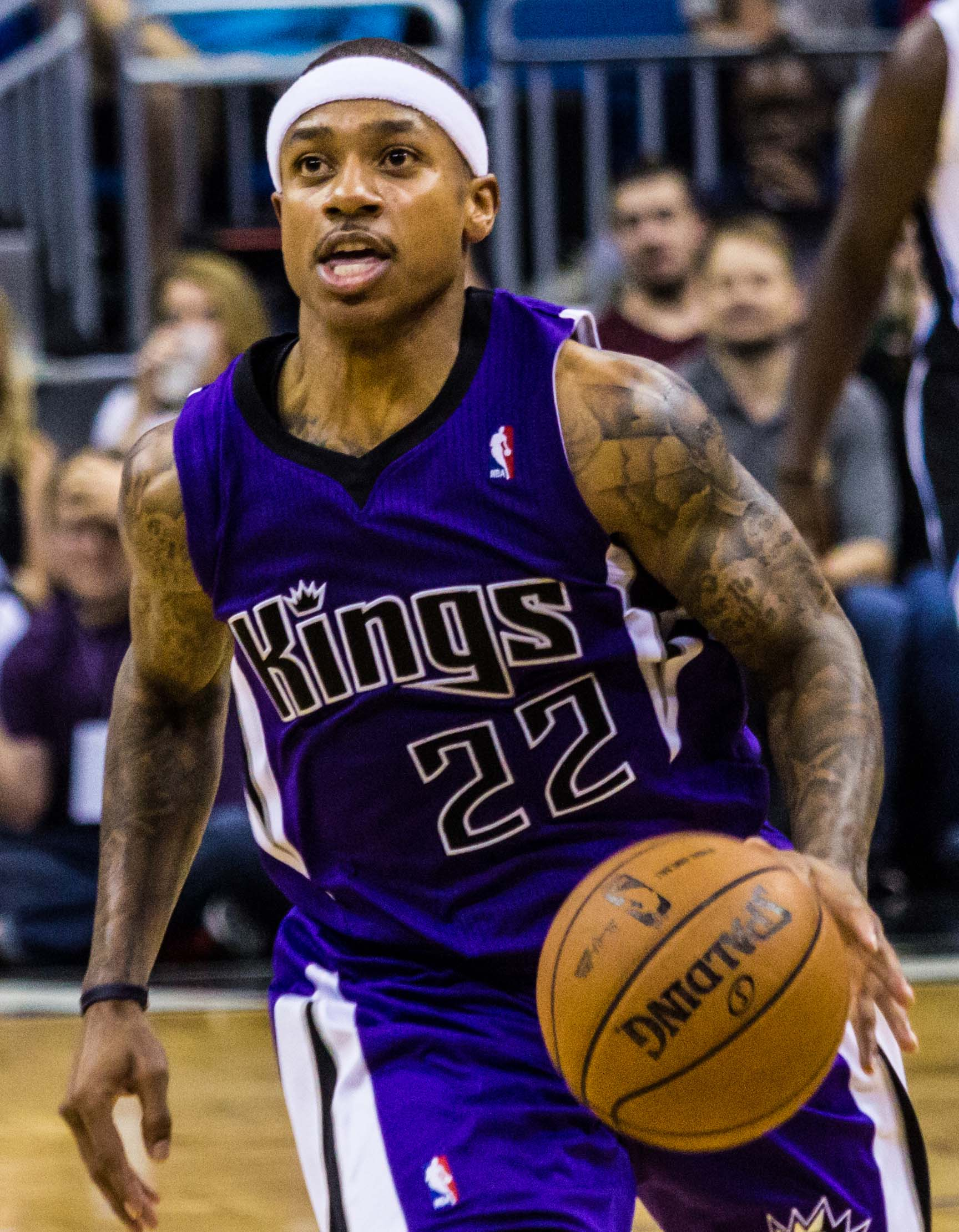
Thomas in 2013

Before the 2011 NBA draft, Thomas participated in his own pre-draft documentary entitled "Road to the NBA–The Isaiah Thomas Story". Thomas was selected in the second round of the 2011 NBA draft with the 60th and final pick by the Sacramento Kings. On February 19, 2012, he recorded his first double-double with 23 points and 11 assists against the Cleveland Cavaliers.

On March 1, 2012, Thomas was named the Western Conference NBA Rookie of the Month after averaging 12.2 points and 4.4 assists per contest in February. No player before had gone on to win Rookie of the Month honors after being picked last in the NBA draft. On April 2, 2012, Thomas was once again named Western Conference NBA Rookie of the Month after posting averages of 13.6 points and 4.9 assists per contest in March. Thomas was also named to the NBA All-Rookie Second Team and finished seventh in NBA Rookie of the Year voting.

On January 19, 2014, Thomas scored a then-career-high of 38 points during a loss to the Oklahoma City Thunder. Five days later, he tied this same total in points against the Indiana Pacers. On March 18, 2014, Thomas recorded his first career triple-double with 24 points, 11 assists, and 10 rebounds in a 117–111 overtime victory over the Washington Wizards; in doing so, Thomas became the shortest player to ever record a triple-double in the NBA. During the 2013–14 season, Thomas joined Calvin Murphy (twice), Dana Barros, Damon Stoudamire, and Michael Adams as the only players under 6 ft (1.8 m) tall to average over 20 points and six assists per game in a season.

Thomas was immensely popular in his three seasons in Sacramento; his show of solidarity and frequent appearances at City Council meetings during the Kings' relocation saga, in particular, endeared him to many fans.

=== Phoenix Suns (2014–2015) ===
On July 12, 2014, Thomas signed with the Phoenix Suns on a four-year, $27 million contract in a sign-and-trade deal that also sent the rights of Alex Oriakhi to the Kings. On August 14, Thomas underwent a successful arthroscopy of his left wrist, for an injury sustained the previous season. Thomas made his debut for the Suns in their victorious 119–99 season opener over the Los Angeles Lakers, in which he recorded 23 points.

After missing eight games with an ankle injury, Thomas returned to action on December 12, 2014, scoring 10 points in the Suns' 105–103 loss to the Detroit Pistons. On January 21, 2015, he recorded a season-high 27 points off the bench in a 118–113 victory over the Portland Trail Blazers. On February 5, Thomas was announced as a contestant for the NBA Skills Challenge, making him the shortest contestant to ever participate in the event.

=== Boston Celtics (2015–2017) ===
On February 19, 2015, Thomas was traded to the Boston Celtics in exchange for Marcus Thornton and a 2016 first-round pick. During his Celtics tenure, Thomas emerged as a star, a fan favorite, and an "elite crunch-time scorer".

Thomas made his debut for the Celtics on February 18, 2015, in a 118–111 overtime loss to the Los Angeles Lakers, scoring 21 points off the bench. On March 2, 2015, he was named Eastern Conference Player of the Week for games played Monday, February 23, through Sunday, March 1. Thomas later missed eight games in March with a bruised lower back. On April 8, he scored a season-high 34 points in a 113–103 victory over the Detroit Pistons. Thomas subsequently earned Eastern Conference Player of the Week honors for games played Monday, April 6, through Sunday, April 12. In his first career playoff game on April 19, Thomas recorded 22 points and 10 assists in a first-round Game 1 loss to the Cleveland Cavaliers. The Celtics went on to lose to the Cavaliers in a four-game sweep, with Thomas averaging 17.5 points and 7.0 assists during the series. As a result of his sixth-man role with both Phoenix and Boston in 2014–15, Thomas finished second in the NBA Sixth Man of the Year Award voting.

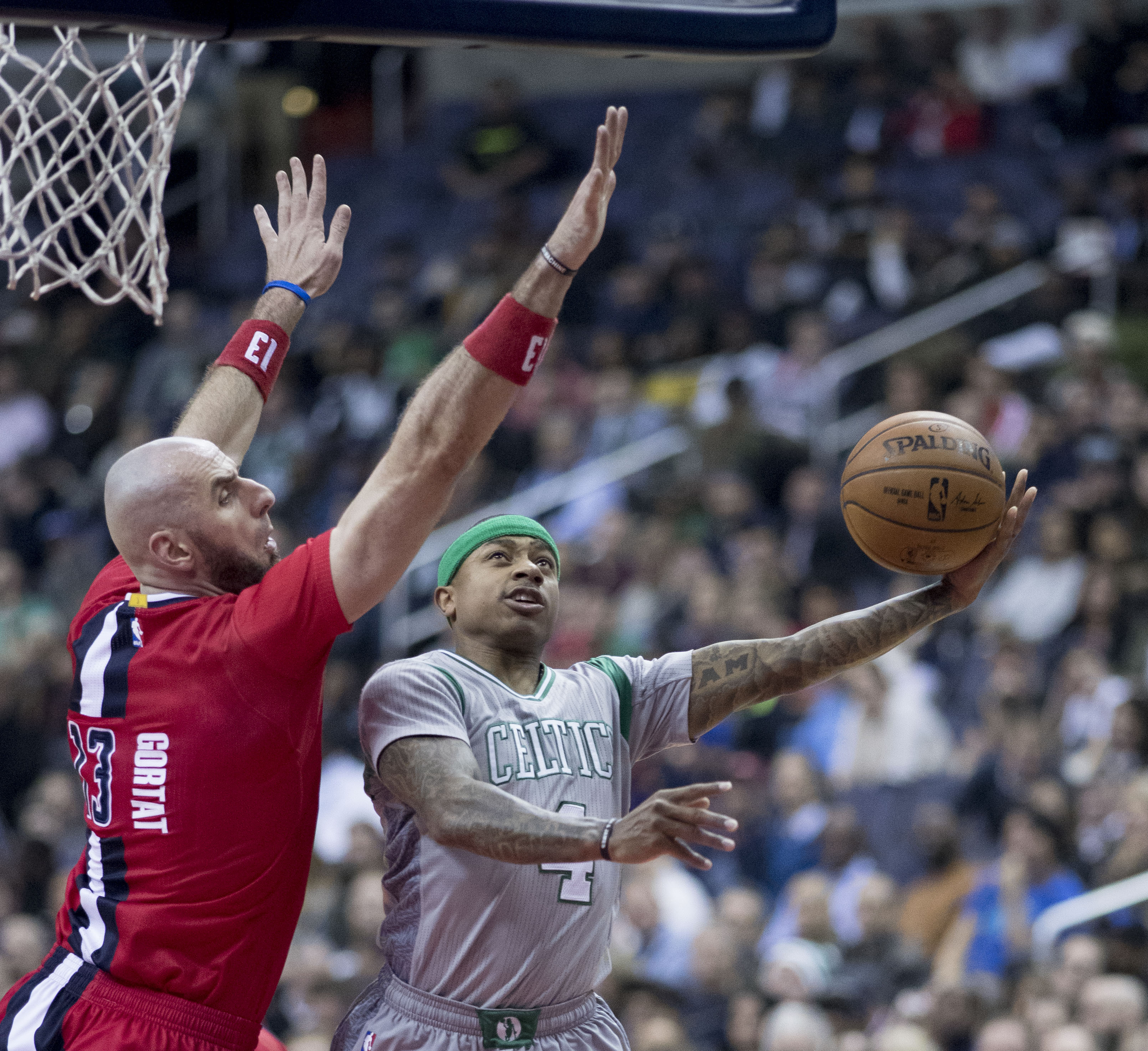
Thomas attacking the basket in January 2017

Thomas continued to play for the Celtics during the 2015–16 season. On December 16, 2015, Thomas tied his then-career high of 38 points in a 119–116 loss to the Detroit Pistons. On January 28, 2016, Thomas was named an Eastern Conference All-Star reserve for the 2016 NBA All-Star Game. He became the lowest draft pick to be named an All-Star since the NBA draft was reduced to two rounds in 1989. Thomas also became only the ninth player under 6 feet (1.8 m) to be named an All-Star, while also tying Calvin Murphy as the shortest player to be selected for the All-Star Game. On February 8, 2016, Thomas was named Eastern Conference Player of the Week for games played Monday, February 1, through Sunday, February 7.

With the Celtics down 2–0 to the Atlanta Hawks in the first round of the 2016 playoffs, Thomas scored a then-career-high 42 points in Game 3 in Boston to lift the Celtics to a 111–103 victory. He became only the ninth Celtic to score 40 points in a playoff game. With 28 points in Game 4, Thomas helped the Celtics even the series at 2–2 with a 104–95 overtime victory. However, the Celtics went on to lose the series in six games.

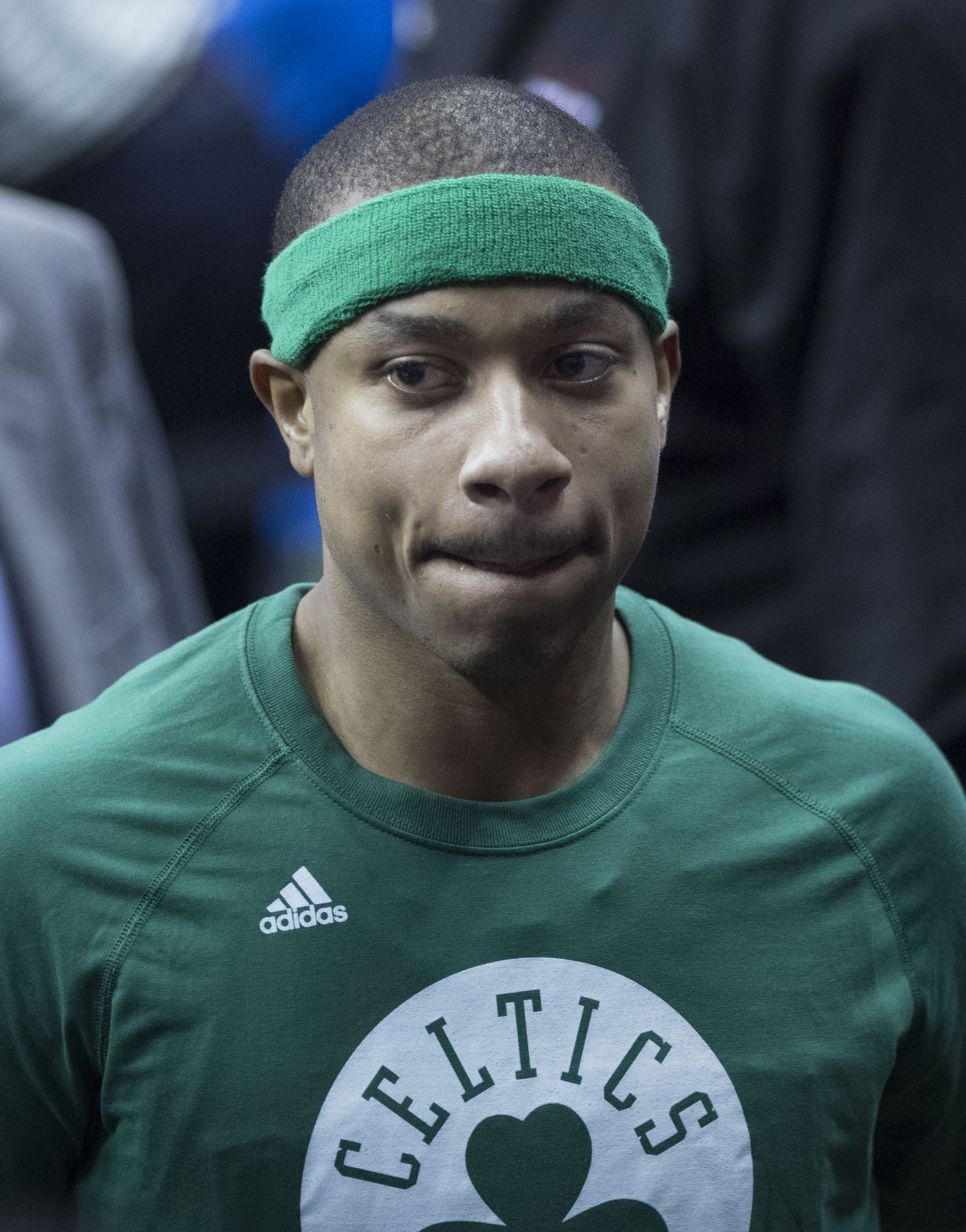
Thomas in 2017

Thomas scored 20 or more points in 20 of the first 21 games of the 2016–2017 season. He was injured in a December 5, 2016, game against the Houston Rockets and received a platelet-rich plasma injection. After returning from a four-game absence for what the Celtics described as a groin strain, Thomas continued to put up big numbers. On December 20, he scored a then-career-high 44 points in a 112–109 overtime victory over the Memphis Grizzlies. He also matched his career best for three-pointers, going 7-of-10 from outside the arc. Thomas earned Eastern Conference Player of the Week honors for the week spanning December 19 through December 25. On December 30 against the Miami Heat, he scored 29 of his career-high 52 points in the fourth quarter, setting a franchise record for points in a period and leading Boston to a 117–114 victory. Thomas' 52 points was the fourth-highest scoring total in Celtics history—Larry Bird holds the record, having scored 60 points in March 1985 game. On January 3, 2017, Thomas recorded 29 points and a career-high 15 assists in a 115–104 victory over the Utah Jazz.

On January 26, 2017, Thomas was named an Eastern Conference All-Star reserve for the 2017 NBA All-Star Game. He averaged 32.9 points in January, marking the third-highest monthly average in team history. On February 2, Thomas was named Eastern Conference Player of the Month for January. He led the NBA in scoring (32.9 ppg) and tied for fifth in the East in assists (6.9 apg) for the month as the Celtics went 10–4 to take over first place in the Atlantic Division. On February 15, Thomas scored 33 points in a 116–108 win over the Philadelphia 76ers. It was his 40th straight 20-point game, tying a team record set by John Havlicek during the 1971–72 season. The following day, Thomas broke Havlicek's team record with a 41st straight 20-point game; he scored 29 points in a 104–103 loss to the Chicago Bulls. With 19 points against the Atlanta Hawks on February 27, Thomas' franchise-record streak of consecutive 20-point games ended at 43. It was only the second time during the season that he did not score at least 20 points in a game.

Thomas suffered an injury in a March 15, 2017, game against the Minnesota Timberwolves and missed the following two games. With 32 points against the Milwaukee Bucks on March 29, he became only the sixth Celtic ever to score 2,000 points in a single season. Thomas also extended his streak with at least one three-pointer to a franchise-best 50 straight games. Behind his leadership, the Celtics finished the 2016–2017 season as the top seed in the Eastern Conference; the team's record was 53–29. Thomas finished the regular season as the third-leading scorer in the NBA, averaging 28.9 points per game.

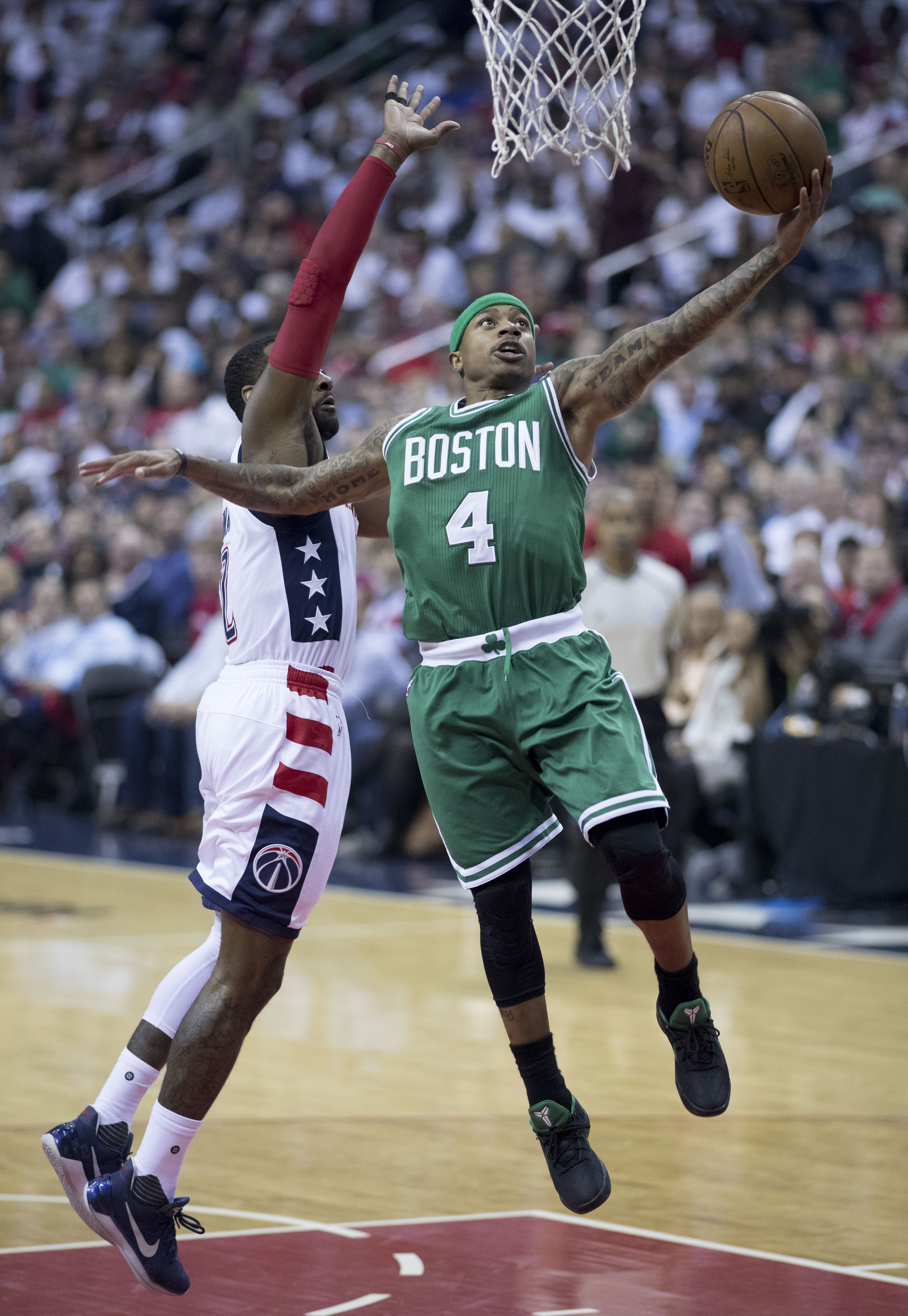
Thomas drives to the basket in the 2017 playoffs

In the 2017 playoffs, Thomas led the Celtics to a first-round series victory over the Chicago Bulls after learning the day before the series began that his younger sister, Chyna, had died in a car accident. This was the Celtics first playoff series win in five years. After the Celtics defeated the Bulls in six games, Thomas flew cross-country to attend his sister's funeral. Thomas returned to Boston for Game 1 of the Eastern Conference Semifinals and helped the Celtics defeat the Washington Wizards 123–111. According to ESPN, during Game 1, "Thomas lost a front tooth following an inadvertent elbow from Otto Porter, requiring surgery to replace it and fix two other shifted teeth. He played through the dental wreck and scored 33 points and notched nine assists in the win. He didn't miss a game". Two days later in Game 2, Thomas scored 53 points—the second-highest total in Celtics playoff history—to help Boston win 129–119 in overtime and take a 2–0 lead in the series. He became only the fifth Celtic to score 50 or more points in a postseason game, missing John Havlicek's team record by one point. In Game 7, Thomas scored 29 points and had 12 assists to help the Celtics advance to the Eastern Conference Finals for the first time since 2012 with a 115–105 victory.

After the Celtics lost the first two games of the 2017 Eastern Conference Finals to the Cleveland Cavaliers, Thomas was ruled out for the rest of the postseason with a hip injury. In a statement, the Celtics said:

Isaiah Thomas will miss the remainder of this year's postseason following re-aggravation of a right femoral-acetabular impingement with labral tear during Game 2 of the Eastern Conference Finals against Cleveland. Thomas initially injured the hip during the third quarter of the Celtics' March 15 game against Minnesota... the injury was further aggravated during Game 6 of the Eastern Conference Semifinals at Washington on May 12.

The Celtics were defeated by the Cavaliers in five games in the Eastern Conference Finals.

Thomas finished fifth in the NBA's most valuable player (MVP) voting for the 2016–17 season.

=== Cleveland Cavaliers (2017–2018) ===
On August 22, 2017, Thomas was traded, along with Jae Crowder, Ante Žižić, and the Brooklyn Nets' unprotected 2018 first-round draft pick, to the Cleveland Cavaliers in exchange for Kyrie Irving. However, during the post-trade physical examination by Cleveland staff, concerns were raised about the health of Thomas' previously injured right hip. As a result, eight days after the deal was announced, the Celtics agreed to send the Cavaliers a 2020 second-round draft pick via the Miami Heat to complete the trade. In September 2017, TheAthletic.com reported that Thomas had been playing with a number of secondary issues in his right hip, such as a loss of cartilage and some arthritis, for several seasons. Thomas opted to pursue rehabilitation rather than surgery for the hip because he believed that the lengthy post-surgery recovery period would cause teams to be less willing to offer him large contracts during his upcoming free agency.

Thomas' right hip injury proved to be debilitating, and it damaged his NBA career. The injury prevented Thomas from playing for the Cavaliers until January 2018. Upon his return to the court, Thomas was unable to play as effectively as he had played in earlier seasons.

On January 2, 2018, Thomas made his long-awaited debut for the Cavaliers, scoring 17 points in 19 minutes off the bench in a 127–110 victory over the Portland Trail Blazers. A day later, Thomas returned to TD Garden. Although he did not play in the Cavaliers' 102–88 loss to the Celtics, Thomas received a standing ovation from the Celtics fans. On January 6, he had 19 points and four assists in his second appearance and first start of the season in a 131–127 victory over the Orlando Magic. On January 20, Thomas scored a season-high 24 points in a 148–124 loss to the Oklahoma City Thunder. He averaged 14.7 points per game for the Cavaliers on 36.1% shooting.

=== Los Angeles Lakers (2018) ===
On February 8, 2018, the Cavaliers traded Thomas, Channing Frye, and a 2018 first-round draft pick to the Los Angeles Lakers in exchange for Jordan Clarkson and Larry Nance Jr. In his Lakers debut two days later, Thomas scored 22 points off the bench in a 130–123 loss to the Dallas Mavericks. On March 1, he scored a season-high 29 points in a 131–113 victory over the Miami Heat. On March 29, Thomas was ruled out for the rest of the season after undergoing arthroscopic surgery on his right hip. In 17 games for the Lakers, he averaged 15.6 points per game on 38.3% shooting.

=== Denver Nuggets (2018–2019) ===
On July 16, 2018, Thomas signed a one-year deal with the Denver Nuggets for a veteran's minimum contract of $2 million. After his recovery from hip surgery, Thomas made his debut for the Nuggets on February 13, 2019, scoring all eight of his points in the third quarter of Denver's 120–118 victory over the Sacramento Kings. It was his first game since March 22, 2018. In the 12 games Thomas played for Denver, he averaged 8.1 points per game on 34.3% shooting.

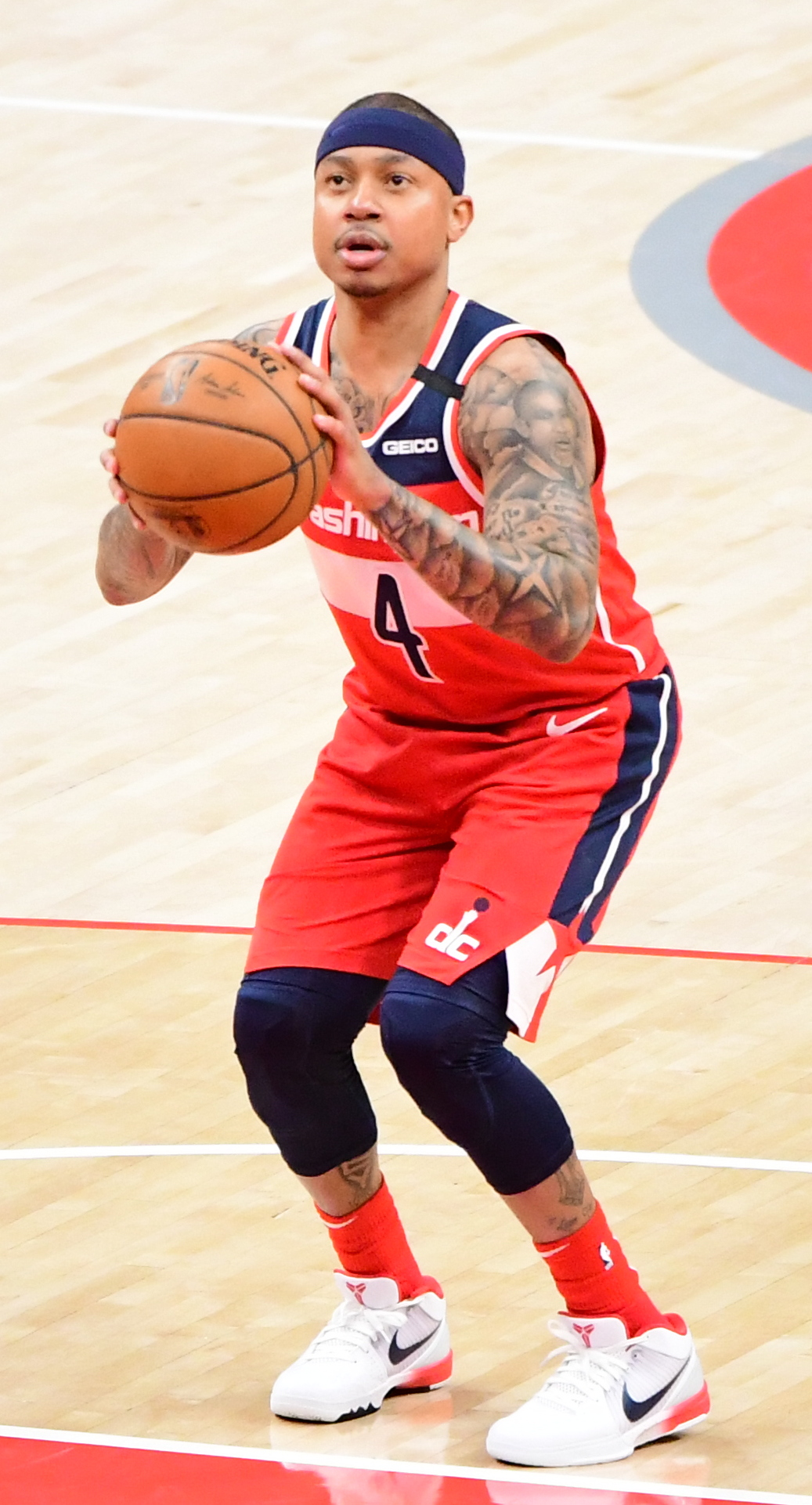
Thomas shoots a free throw in 2020

=== Washington Wizards (2019–2020) ===
On July 10, 2019, Thomas signed with the Washington Wizards. He injured his left thumb on September 16 and underwent surgery on two days later. On December 22, Thomas was suspended for two games without pay for entering the stands during a game. In 40 games with the Wizards, he averaged 12.2 points per game on 40.8% shooting and 41.3% shooting from beyond the three-point arc.

On February 6, 2020, Thomas was traded to the Los Angeles Clippers as a trade deadline acquisition. However, he was waived the next day.

On May 6, 2020, during the COVID-19 pandemic, Thomas underwent right hip resurfacing surgery. ESPN reported that before the resurfacing surgery, "Thomas' hip was bone-on-bone, the pain [was] relentless and the constant favoring of his right side constantly compromised his balance." In October 2020, Thomas said: "'It's like night and day for me. There's no more pain. I've got my full range of motion. For three years, I was trying to play the best players in the world on one leg. I needed help from my kids to put my socks on in the morning.'"

=== New Orleans Pelicans (2021) ===
On April 3, 2021, Thomas signed a 10-day contract with the New Orleans Pelicans. In three games with the Pelicans, he averaged 7.7 points per game.

=== Grand Rapids Gold (2021) ===
On December 13, 2021, Thomas signed with the Grand Rapids Gold of the NBA G League. He made his debut for the team on December 15, scoring 42 points, eight assists, and six rebounds in 42 minutes during a 131–127 loss to the Fort Wayne Mad Ants.

=== Return to the Lakers (2021) ===
On December 17, 2021, Thomas signed a 10-day contract with the Los Angeles Lakers to return to the franchise for a second time after the team was granted a hardship exception. In his season debut, Thomas scored 19 points in 22 minutes in a loss against the Minnesota Timberwolves. He played four games for the Lakers.

=== Dallas Mavericks (2021–2022) ===
On December 29, 2021, Thomas signed a 10-day contract with the Dallas Mavericks. He only played in one game for the Mavericks.

=== Return to the Gold (2022) ===
On February 14, 2022, Thomas was re-acquired by the Grand Rapids Gold. Across three games, Thomas averaged 41.3 points per game.

=== Charlotte Hornets (2022) ===
On March 2, 2022, Thomas signed a 10-day contract with the Charlotte Hornets and ten days later, he signed a second 10-day contract. On March 22, Thomas was signed for the rest of the season. In 17 games with the Hornets, he averaged 8.3 points per game on 43.3% shooting and 39.7% shooting from beyond the three-point line.

Thomas did not play in the NBA during the 2022–23 season. In May 2023, he stated that he hoped to play in the NBA in the 2023–24 season.

=== Salt Lake City Stars (2024) ===
On March 6, 2024, Thomas joined the Salt Lake City Stars. In his debut for the Stars, Thomas recorded 32 points and four assists on 7–for–23 shooting from the field. He averaged 32.5 points and 5.3 assists per game across 4 games.

=== Return to the Suns (2024) ===
On March 20, 2024, Thomas signed a 10-day contract with the Phoenix Suns. Later that day, he played in his first NBA game in nearly two years against the Philadelphia 76ers, logging one assist in two minutes played. On March 30, Thomas signed a second 10-day contract with the Suns. He signed with the Suns for the remainder of the season on April 9.

=== Return to Salt Lake City (2025) ===
On January 28, 2025, Thomas rejoined the Salt Lake City Stars, scoring 40 points in his first appearance back with the team.

On November 18, 2025 Thomas received the Basketball Legacy Award from The Sports Museum at TD Garden, for his time with the Boston Celtics.

== National team career ==
In April 2018, Thomas was selected to the 35-player 2018–20 USA men's national team roster and attended the team's Las Vegas minicamp in July 2018. In February 2021, he was selected to the 14-player roster for the final round of the 2022 FIBA AmeriCup qualifiers. On February 19, in his first competitive game in over a year, Thomas scored 19 points in a 93–77 victory over Bahamas. He followed it up the day after by scoring nine points, all in the first quarter, in a 96–75 victory against Mexico.

In November 2021, Thomas, along with Justin Anderson, joined the USA men's basketball roster for the 2023 FIBA Basketball World Cup qualifiers. Both of the players were injury replacements for Frank Mason III and DaQuan Jeffries.

== Post-playing career ==
On May 14, 2026, Thomas was hired by the Boston Celtics as a scout.

== Career statistics ==
Legend
GP	Games played	GS	Games started	MPG	Minutes per game
FG%	Field goal percentage	3P%	3-point field goal percentage	FT%	Free throw percentage
RPG	Rebounds per game	APG	Assists per game	SPG	Steals per game
BPG	Blocks per game	PPG	Points per game	**Bold**	Career high
*	Led the league

=== NBA ===
==== Regular season ====
Year	Team	GP	GS	MPG	FG%	3P%	FT%	RPG	APG	SPG	BPG	PPG
2011–12	Sacramento	65	37	25.5	.448	.379	.832	2.6	4.1	.8	.1	11.5
2012–13	Sacramento	79	62	26.9	.440	.358	.882	2.0	4.0	.8	.0	13.9
2013–14	Sacramento	72	54	**34.7**	.453	.349	.850	2.9	**6.3**	**1.3**	.1	20.3
2014–15	Phoenix	46	1	25.7	.426	.391	.872	2.4	3.7	1.0	.1	15.2
2014–15	Boston	21	0	25.9	.411	.345	.861	2.1	5.4	.6	.0	19.0
2015–16	Boston	**82***	**79**	32.2	.428	.359	.871	**3.0**	6.2	1.1	.1	22.2
2016–17	Boston	76	76	33.8	**.463**	.379	.909	2.7	5.9	.9	.2	**28.9**
2017–18	Cleveland	15	14	27.1	.361	.253	.868	2.1	4.5	.6	.1	14.7
2017–18	L.A. Lakers	17	1	26.8	.383	.327	.921	2.1	5.0	.4	.1	15.6
2018–19	Denver	12	0	15.1	.343	.279	.630	1.1	1.9	.4	.1	8.1
2019–20	Washington	40	37	23.1	.403	.413	.816	1.7	3.7	.3	.2	12.2
2020–21	New Orleans	3	0	16.1	.333	.250	**1.000**	1.3	1.7	.3	.0	7.7
2021–22	L.A. Lakers	4	1	25.2	.308	.227	.727	2.0	1.5	.0	**.5**	9.3
2021–22	Dallas	1	0	13.3	.375	.000	—	.0	4.0	.0	.0	6.0
2021–22	Charlotte	17	0	12.9	.433	.397	.933	1.2	1.4	.4	.2	8.3
2023–24	Phoenix	6	0	3.2	.300	**.500**	—	.0	.5	.0	.0	1.3
Career		556	362	28.0	.434	.363	.872	2.4	4.8	.8	.1	17.5
All-Star		2	0	18.9	.423	.333	1.000	2.0	2.0	.5	0	14.5

==== Playoffs ====
Year	Team	GP	GS	MPG	FG%	3P%	FT%	RPG	APG	SPG	BPG	PPG
2015	Boston	4	0	29.8	.333	.167	**.969**	3.0	**7.0**	.8	.0	17.5
2016	Boston	6	6	**36.6**	.395	.283	.809	3.0	5.0	.7	**.8**	**24.2**
2017	Boston	**15**	**15**	34.7	**.425**	**.333**	.820	**3.1**	6.7	**.9**	.1	23.3
2024	Phoenix	1	0	3.6	.000	.000	—	.0	.0	.0	.0	.0
Career		26	21	33.2	.404	.301	.842	3.0	6.1	.8	.3	21.7

=== NBA G League ===
==== Regular season ====
Year	Team	GP	GS	MPG	FG%	3P%	FT%	RPG	APG	SPG	BPG	PPG
2021–22	Grand Rapids	3	3	**37.7**	**.521**	**.425**	.783	**3.7**	**6.3**	.0	.0	**41.3**
2023–24	Salt Lake City	4	4	36.9	.407	.446	.909	3.0	5.3	**1.3**	.0	32.5
2024–25	Salt Lake City	**14**	**14**	30.8	.446	.410	**.962**	1.7	5.6	1.2	.4	29.1
Career		21	21	32.9	.451	.422	.908	2.2	5.7	1.0	.3	31.5

=== College ===
Year	Team	GP	GS	MPG	FG%	3P%	FT%	RPG	APG	SPG	BPG	PPG
2008–09	Washington	35	34	28.4	.418	.291	.686	3.0	2.6	1.1	.1	15.5
2009–10	Washington	35	35	31.1	.415	.327	.732	3.9	3.2	1.1	.1	16.9
2010–11	Washington	35	35	31.9	.445	.349	.719	3.5	6.1	1.3	.1	16.8
Career		105	104	30.5	.426	.322	.736	3.5	4.0	1.2	.1	16.4

== Personal life ==
Thomas's sister, Chyna, died in a one-car accident on Interstate 5 in Federal Way, Washington, on April 15, 2017.

Thomas and his wife, Kayla, have three children together.

== See also ==
- List of shortest players in NBA history
- List of NBA career free throw percentage leaders
- List of NBA single-game playoff scoring leaders
