= Curtis Senior High School =

Coordinates: 47°13′18″N 122°33′02″W

George R. Curtis Senior High School

Location
- 8425 40th W University Place, Washington, 98466; United States

Information
- Type: Public secondary
- Established: 1957
- School district: University Place School District
- Principal: Tom Adams
- Teaching staff: 53.70 (FTE)
- Grades: 10–12
- Enrollment: 1,303 (2023-2024)
- Student to teacher ratio: 24.26
- Campus: Suburban
- Colors: Blue and White
- Mascot: Vikings
- Website: Curtis Senior High School

Curtis Senior High School is a public high school located in University Place, Washington. Curtis Senior High School is a part of the University Place School District and the only high school in the district.

The University Place school district includes most of University Place and portions of Fircrest and Tacoma.

== History ==
The school's namesake comes from the former UPSD Superintendent George R. Curtis. The school opened in 1957 as a joint junior-senior high school at the corner of 40th and Grandview. In 1962, a high school facility was built about 500 yards east of the junior high that then extended up 40th Street. This separated the schools from 8th-9th grade for the junior high and 10th-12th grade for the senior high school. And after this, the original site became just a junior high school. In 2009, the original junior high was torn down and a new facility was built about 400 yards northeast of that site.

== Academics ==
Curtis Senior High School has both Advanced Placement classes and core classes for students. The school also offers Running Start, collaborating with Tacoma Community College, a program for Juniors and Seniors by taking classes to gain college credit while in high school.

== Notable alumni ==
- Beau Baldwin - former offensive coordinator, Arizona State; former football head coach, Cal Poly
- Scott Cairns - poet and Guggenheim Fellow
- Andrea Geubelle - 2016 Summer Olympics track and field, triple jump
- Gary Larson - creator and writer of The Far Side
- Mike Levenseller - professional football wide receiver, played 3 seasons in NFL
- Adrienne Martelli - 2012 Summer Olympics bronze medalist in rowing, women's quadruple sculls
- Singor Mobley - former NFL and Canadian Football League defensive back
- Isaiah Thomas - NBA point guard, two-time NBA All-Star in 2016 & 2017
- Chuck Arnold - President of the Seattle Seahawks
- Jennifer Cohen - University of Southern California Athletic Director
- Morgan Weaver - professional soccer forward for the Portland Thorns FC
- Cindy Brunson - Sports anchor and reporter, most known for ESPN's SportsCenter
- Zoom Diallo - college basketball player for the Kentucky Wildcats (transferred after his junior year of high school)
