= University Place School District =

School district in Washington, United States

Address
- 3717 Grandview Drive West University Place, Washington, 98466; United States

District information
- Type: Public
- Grades: PreK–12
- NCES District ID: 5309180

Students and staff
- Students: 5,661
- Teachers: 310.91 (FTE)
- Staff: 160.17 (FTE)
- Student–teacher ratio: 18.21

Other information
- Website: www.upsd83.org

The University Place School District #83, located in University Place, Washington, between Tacoma and Puget Sound, was officially established on November 2, 1895.

The district includes most of University Place and portions of Fircrest and Tacoma.

Student enrollment in October 2009 was 5,616.

== Schools ==
- Chambers Primary
- Sunset Primary
- University Place Primary
- Evergreen Primary
- Narrows View Intermediate
- Drum Intermediate
- Curtis Junior High School
- Curtis Senior High School
