= Fircrest, Washington =

- City
- Location of Fircrest, Washington
- Coordinates: 47°13′51″N 122°30′57″W
- Country: United States
- State: Washington
- County: Pierce

Government
  - Type: Council–manager
  - Mayor: Nikki Bufford
  - City manager: Dawn Masko

Area
  - Total: 1.58 sq mi (4.10 km^{2})
  - Land: 1.58 sq mi (4.10 km^{2})
  - Water: 0 sq mi (0.00 km^{2})
- Elevation: 259 ft (79 m)

Population (2020)
  - Total: 7,156
  - Density: 4,316.6/sq mi (1,666.63/km^{2})
- Time zone: UTC-8 (Pacific (PST))
  - Summer (DST): UTC-7 (PDT)
- ZIP code: 98466
- Area code: 253
- FIPS code: 53-23970
- GNIS feature ID: 2410506
- Website: cityoffircrest.net

Fircrest is a city in Pierce County, Washington, United States. The population was 7,156 at the 2020 census.

== History ==
Fircrest was officially incorporated on September 19, 1925. Like its neighbor University Place, it is a middle-class suburb of Tacoma. The community was developed by Edward Bowes, who later gained fame as the host of the Major Bowes Amateur Hour radio talent show. The town attempted to associate itself with academia by naming a number of its streets after universities (e.g. Princeton, Dartmouth, Yale, Vassar, Stanford) and was originally known as Regents Park in a reference to the regents of a university. Some other streets (e.g. Bowes Drive, Spring Street, and Ramsdell Street) were named after those involved in the initial development.

The Bowes development, through the Narrows Land Company, offered lots with a full street, sidewalk, and sewer network beginning in 1907. The least expensive of these lots were sold for $600 (equivalent to $21,500 in 2025). After development slowed, Bowes left the company in 1911 and prices decreased substantially. New homes were constructed during and after World War I; they were followed by a campaign to incorporate Fircrest as a city to maintain infrastructure left by the development companies. The city later took ownership of the utility network. Fircrest continued to grow after incorporation, annexing surrounding land and attracting more families to live within its borders. The city took control of its parks in 1959, opened its swimming pool in 1962, and created a number of parks around the city for the benefit of residents.

Fircrest was the last "dry" municipality in Washington state, prohibiting the sale of alcohol by the glass. Voters chose to allow the sale of alcohol in Fircrest in the November 2015 election.

In April 2019, citizens of Fircrest overwhelmingly passed a ballot measure that would fund a new pool and community center. The new pool opened in May 2021 and the new community center opened in April of 2022.

== Geography ==
Fircrest borders Tacoma to the north and east and University Place to the west and south; the city of Tacoma has an enclave within Fircrest. This enclave includes a wetland that is the source of Leach Creek.

Formerly, an artificial lake known as Spring Lake was present in the city prior to it being filled in to create Fircrest Park.

According to the United States Census Bureau, the city has a total area of 1.58 square miles (4.09 km^{2}), all of it land.

== Government ==
Since 1988, Fircrest has used a council–manager government, with a city council composed of seven councilmembers. The city mayor is chosen biennially by councilmembers and presides over council meetings. Nikki Bufford was appointed mayor in 2026. Additionally, the city council appoints a city manager to carry out day-to-day operations of the city and policies of the council. Dawn Masko has been the City Manager of Fircrest since June 2023.

== Demographics ==
Historical population
Census	Pop.	Note	%±
1930	441		—
1940	486		10.2%
1950	1,459		200.2%
1960	3,565		144.3%
1970	5,651		58.5%
1980	5,477		−3.1%
1990	5,258		−4.0%
2000	5,868		11.6%
2010	6,497		10.7%
2020	7,156		10.1%
U.S. Decennial Census; 2020 Census

=== 2020 census ===
As of the 2020 census, Fircrest had a population of 7,156. The median age was 41.8 years. 21.9% of residents were under the age of 18 and 18.4% of residents were 65 years of age or older. For every 100 females there were 91.2 males, and for every 100 females age 18 and over there were 87.8 males age 18 and over.

100.0% of residents lived in urban areas, while 0.0% lived in rural areas.

There were 2,832 households in Fircrest, of which 32.4% had children under the age of 18 living in them. Of all households, 51.1% were married-couple households, 13.7% were households with a male householder and no spouse or partner present, and 28.8% were households with a female householder and no spouse or partner present. About 24.6% of all households were made up of individuals and 12.7% had someone living alone who was 65 years of age or older.

There were 2,926 housing units, of which 3.2% were vacant. The homeowner vacancy rate was 1.0% and the rental vacancy rate was 2.9%.

Racial composition as of the 2020 census
Race	Number	Percent
White	5,011	70.0%
Black or African American	555	7.8%
American Indian and Alaska Native	49	0.7%
Asian	398	5.6%
Native Hawaiian and Other Pacific Islander	30	0.4%
Some other race	119	1.7%
Two or more races	994	13.9%
Hispanic or Latino (of any race)	527	7.4%

=== 2010 census ===
As of the 2010 census, there were 6,497 people, 2,705 households, and 1,773 families living in the city. The population density was 4,112.0 inhabitants per square mile (1,587.7/km^{2}). There were 2,847 housing units at an average density of 1,801.9 per square mile (695.7/km^{2}). The racial makeup of the city was 78.9% White, 7.0% African American, 0.7% Native American, 5.1% Asian, 0.5% Pacific Islander, 0.8% from other races, and 7.0% from two or more races. Hispanic or Latino of any race were 4.6% of the population.

There were 2,705 households, of which 31.2% had children under the age of 18 living with them, 48.2% were married couples living together, 13.3% had a female householder with no husband present, 4.0% had a male householder with no wife present, and 34.5% were non-families. 28.7% of all households were made up of individuals, and 13.6% had someone living alone who was 65 years of age or older. The average household size was 2.39 and the average family size was 2.93.

The median age in the city was 41.2 years. 23.3% of residents were under the age of 18; 7% were between the ages of 18 and 24; 24.8% were from 25 to 44; 27.5% were from 45 to 64; and 17.3% were 65 years of age or older. The gender makeup of the city was 46.1% male and 53.9% female.

=== 2000 census ===
As of the 2000 census, there were 5,868 people, 2,505 households, and 1,673 families living in the city. The population density was 3,759.4 people per square mile (1,452.3/km^{2}). There were 2,573 housing units at an average density of 1,648.4 per square mile (636.8/km^{2}). The racial makeup of the city was 87.46% White, 5.20% African American, 0.56% Native American, 2.69% Asian, 0.51% Pacific Islander, 0.46% from other races, and 3.12% from two or more races. Hispanic or Latino of any race were 2.69% of the population.

There were 2,505 households, out of which 28.3% had children under the age of 18 living with them, 53.4% were married couples living together, 10.7% had a female householder with no husband present, and 33.2% were non-families. 28.5% of all households were made up of individuals, and 13.3% had someone living alone who was 65 years of age or older. The average household size was 2.34 and the average family size was 2.85.

In the city, the population was spread out, with 23.1% under the age of 18, 5.5% from 18 to 24, 26.3% from 25 to 44, 24.7% from 45 to 64, and 20.4% who were 65 years of age or older. The median age was 42 years. For every 100 females, there were 88.3 males. For every 100 females age 18 and over, there were 83.8 males.

The median income for a household in the city was $54,912, and the median income for a family was $61,611. Males had a median income of $46,611 versus $32,232 for females. The per capita income for the city was $27,244. 5.9% of the population and 4.6% of families were below the poverty line. Out of the total population, 10.2% of those under the age of 18 and 2.7% of those 65 and older were living below the poverty line.

== Education ==
Most of Fircrest is in the Tacoma Public Schools district, while a part is in the University Place School District. Fircrest Students living within the boundaries of Tacoma Public Schools typically attend Whittier Elementary, then Wainwright Intermediate School, then Foss High School. Otherwise, if inside of University Place School District, students attend Evergreen Primary, then Narrows View Intermediate, then Curtis Junior High, and finally Curtis Senior High.
