= Brian Sullivan (district attorney) =

American politician

Member of the Washington House of Representatives from the 29th district
- In office January 13, 1997 – January 8, 2001
- Preceded by: Carl Scheuerman
- Succeeded by: Steve Kirby

Personal details
- Born: Brian Joseph Sullivan; December 6, 1966 University Place, Washington, U.S.
- Died: December 8, 2014 (aged 48) Utqiaġvik, Alaska, U.S.
- Party: Democratic
- Education: University of Washington, Mississippi College

Brian Joseph Sullivan (December 6, 1966 – December 8, 2014) was an American politician and attorney. He served in the Washington House of Representatives from 1997 to 2001, representing the 29th legislative district.

== Early life and education ==
Sullivan was born in University Place, Washington, and raised in Tacoma, Washington. He received his bachelor's degree from University of Washington and a Juris Doctor from Mississippi College School of Law.

== Career ==
After law school, Sullivan served in the United States Army as a judge advocate general and military police officer. He later practiced law in Tacoma. He served in the Washington House of Representatives as a Democrat from January 1997 to January 2001.

Sullivan relocated to Alaska in 2001 while on duty with the United States Army. In 2007, Sullivan served on the Matanuska-Susitna Borough, Alaska School Board, and in 2010, he unsuccessfully ran for borough mayor. He then moved to Utqiaġvik, Alaska in 2012 and served as an assistant district attorney. Sullivan became involved with the Alaska Republican Party as a district party chair.

== Personal life ==
=== Death ===
On December 8, 2014, Sullivan was shot and killed in a private residence in Utqiaġvik, Alaska (formerly Barrow), which local police investigated as a homicide. Sullivan was 48 years old. On December 26, 2014, Ronald Fischer was indicted by an Nome, Alaska grand jury with the first degree murder of Sullivan, who was seeing a woman that Fischer had previously been romantically involved with. On October 26, 2017, Fischer was found guilty after trial of all counts including first degree murder. On April 6, 2018, Alaska Superior Court Judge Gregory Miller sentenced Fischer to one hundred and five years in prison for the murder of Sullivan.
