= NBA scout =

Person who evaluates player talent or opposing teams' strategies

Scouts are professionals hired by NBA franchises to evaluate player talent or opposing teams' preparation or strategies. A prospect scout typically looks for younger players with potential or existing players whose rights may be available through free agency or trade. An advance scout, however, helps prepare the team by studying the strategies or tendencies of opposing teams. Scouts travel extensively, attending basketball games to do these evaluations.

== Scouting attire and equipment ==
Scouts sometimes dress very casually to blend in with the public and fans at the game. This is done so that other teams do not know the players to which their respective organizations may be actively interested.

In the late 1990s, NBA scouts began using computers to organize information or compile data to evaluate and grade each player or team being scouted.

== Scouting criteria ==
There are many factors which contribute to a scout's analysis of a player and scouts place differing importance on each of these factors. This is commonly called projection. Projection influences some of the best and worst decisions scouts and general managers make. The most basic projections which a scout must make include the player's physical status such as height, weight, age, position, and conditioning. The scout will also study the player's skillset including: shooting and scoring capabilities, ball handling, defensive capabilities, and passing abilities. The scout will also attempt to note the presence or absence of intangibles such as coachability, character, desire, and instincts.
