= University Place, Washington =

- City
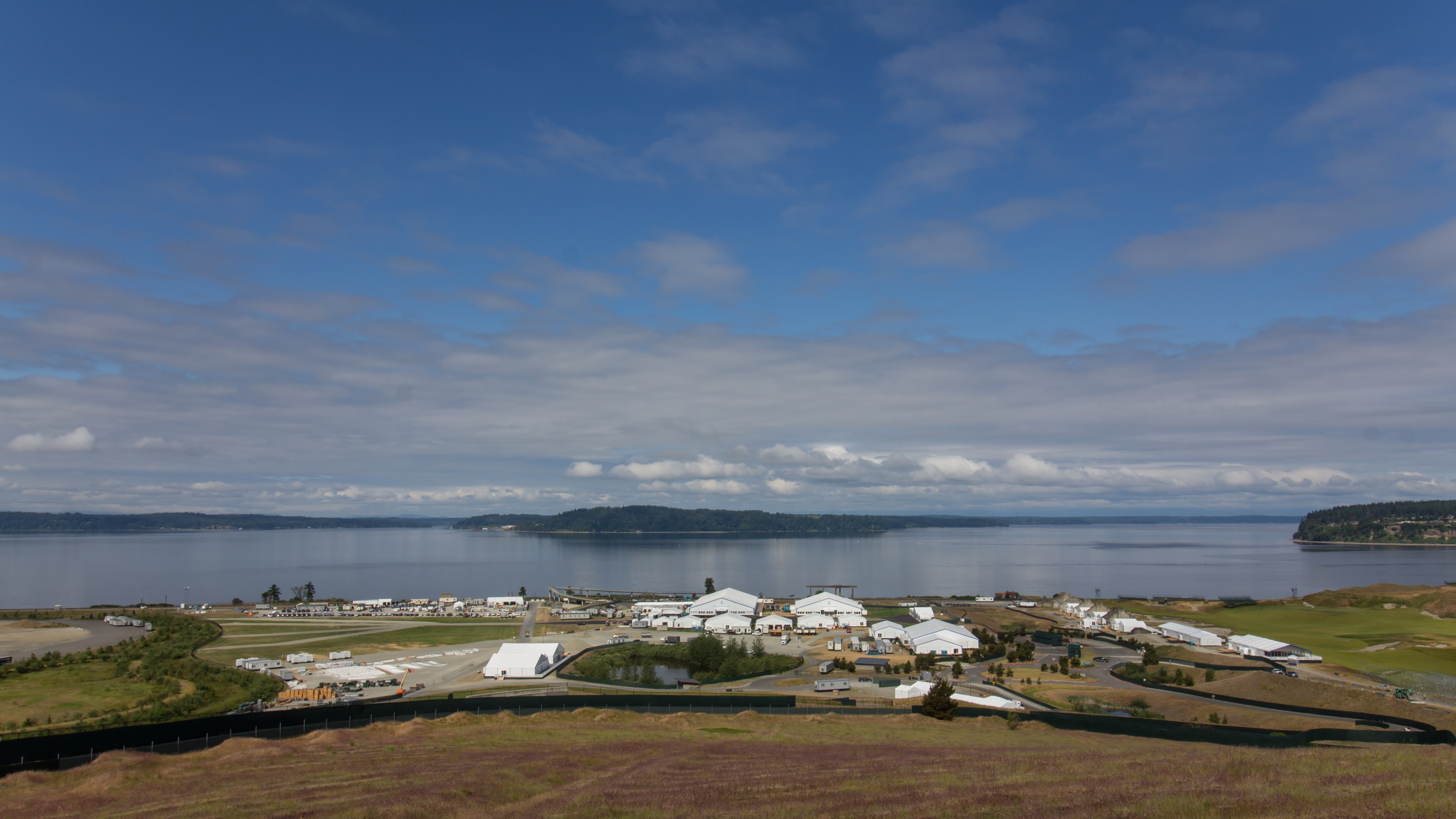
- Chambers Bay Golf Course

- Location of University Place, Washington
- Coordinates: 47°12′54″N 122°32′45″W
- Country: United States
- State: Washington
- County: Pierce
- Incorporated: August 31, 1995

Government
  - Type: Council–manager
  - Mayor: Stan Flemming

Area
  - Total: 8.51 sq mi (22.03 km^{2})
  - Land: 8.34 sq mi (21.60 km^{2})
  - Water: 0.17 sq mi (0.44 km^{2})
- Elevation: 417 ft (127 m)

Population (2020)
  - Total: 34,866
  - Estimate (2024): 35,160
  - Density: 4,150/sq mi (1,603/km^{2})
- Time zone: UTC–8 (Pacific (PST))
  - Summer (DST): UTC–7 (PDT)
- ZIP Codes: 98464, 98466, 98467
- Area code: 253
- FIPS code: 53-73465
- GNIS feature ID: 2412136
- Website: cityofup.com

University Place is a city in Pierce County, Washington, United States. Its population was 34,866 at the 2020 census. University Place received its name in the 1800s when the University of Puget Sound, a private liberal-arts college in North Tacoma, purchased land along the primary north–south route of Grandview Drive.

== History ==
University Place received its name in the 1800s when the University of Puget Sound, a private liberal-arts college in North Tacoma, purchased land along the primary north–south route of Grandview Drive. The school sought to build a new campus there, but ended up selling the land back to the city for about $11,000. University Place remained an unincorporated part of Pierce County until the City of University Place was formed on August 31, 1995.

Today, University Place is largely suburban in character and functions as a mixed business and residential area with waterfront on the Puget Sound. The town is home to Curtis Senior High School and Charles Wright Academy.

Chambers Bay golf course opened in 2007 to favorable reviews. A Scottish links-style course, Chambers Bay hosted the 2010 U.S. Amateur and the 2015 U.S. Open. A 28-acre (11 ha) mixed-use development, University Place Town Center, was constructed in the late 2000s and early 2010s to serve as a commercial and civic center for the city. The town center comprises several residential buildings and retailers in addition to a public plaza, the city hall, a Pierce County Library System branch, and the police department offices. The University Place city government financed the development and took on debt to cover its portion; in 2012, it was refinanced to avoid a balloon payment.

== Geography ==
The city is bordered to the west by Puget Sound, to the south by Lakewood, and to the north and east by Tacoma. Fircrest also forms part of the eastern border. According to the United States Census Bureau, University Place has a total area of 8.51 square miles (22.04 km^{2}), of which, 8.34 square miles (21.60 km^{2}) is land and 0.17 square miles (0.44 km^{2}) is water.

== Demographics ==
Historical population
Census	Pop.	Note	%±
1970	13,230		—
1980	20,381		54.1%
1990	27,701		35.9%
2000	29,933		8.1%
2010	31,144		4.0%
2020	34,866		12.0%
2024 (est.)	35,160		0.8%
U.S. Decennial Census; 2020 Census

=== 2020 census ===
As of the 2020 census, University Place had a population of 34,866, 13,944 households, and 9,208 families residing in the city. The median age was 39.5 years; 22.8% of residents were under the age of 18 and 18.0% of residents were 65 years of age or older, and for every 100 females there were 89.6 males while for every 100 females age 18 and over there were 85.5 males age 18 and over.

There were 13,944 households in University Place, of which 31.6% had children under the age of 18 living in them. Of all households, 48.0% were married-couple households, 15.4% were households with a male householder and no spouse or partner present, and 29.5% were households with a female householder and no spouse or partner present. About 26.9% of all households were made up of individuals and 11.3% had someone living alone who was 65 years of age or older.

There were 14,427 housing units, of which 3.3% were vacant. The homeowner vacancy rate was 0.8% and the rental vacancy rate was 2.9%.

100.0% of residents lived in urban areas, while 0.0% lived in rural areas.

Racial composition as of the 2020 census
Race	Number	Percent
White	21,583	61.9%
Black or African American	3,169	9.1%
American Indian and Alaska Native	252	0.7%
Asian	3,796	10.9%
Native Hawaiian and Other Pacific Islander	418	1.2%
Some other race	1,087	3.1%
Two or more races	4,561	13.1%
Hispanic or Latino (of any race)	3,312	9.5%

=== 2010 census ===
As of the 2010 census, there were 31,144 people, 12,819 households, and 8,476 families living in the city. The population density was 3,698.8 inhabitants per square mile (1,428.1/km^{2}). There were 13,573 housing units at an average density of 1,612.0 per square mile (622.4/km^{2}). The racial makeup of the city was 71.0% White, 8.5% African American, 0.8% Native American, 9.0% Asian, 0.8% Pacific Islander, 1.7% from other races, and 8.2% from two or more races. Hispanic or Latino of any race were 6.7% of the population.

There were 12,819 households, of which 32.7% had children under the age of 18 living with them, 47.9% were married couples living together, 14.0% had a female householder with no husband present, 4.2% had a male householder with no wife present, and 33.9% were non-families. 27.7% of all households were made up of individuals, and 9.5% had someone living alone who was 65 years of age or older. The average household size was 2.41 and the average family size was 2.94.

The median age in the city was 39.4 years. 23.6% of residents were under the age of 18; 9.3% were between the ages of 18 and 24; 24.3% were from 25 to 44; 28.9% were from 45 to 64; and 14.1% were 65 years of age or older. The gender makeup of the city was 47.0% male and 53.0% female.

== Media ==
University Place's news is primarily covered by The News Tribune (Tacoma) and is part of the Seattle media market. It is also covered by University Place Patch, a hyper-local news website that launched in October 2010. Earlier newspapers for the community were the weekly Suburban Times (1970s), published by Dave Sclair (who, starting in 1970, also published Western Flyer); and, in the 1980s, the Lakewood Press, published by Grace T. Eubanks and later Dane S. Claussen, which launched the University Place Press as a monthly and then biweekly before it folded in early 1989.

== Education ==
The University Place School District serves most of the city, which manages eight public schools. Primary schools teach kindergarten through fourth grade. Intermediate schools teach grades five through seven. Junior high is grades eight and nine. High school students are in grades ten through twelve.

- Curtis Senior High
- Curtis Junior High
- Drum Intermediate
- Narrows View Intermediate
- Chambers Primary
- Evergreen Primary
- Sunset Primary
- University Place Primary

Portions of the city are in Tacoma Public Schools and in the Steilacoom Historical School District.

== Notable people ==
- Gary Larson, cartoonist and creator of The Far Side
- John J. Nance, pilot and author
- Dorothy Olsen, aircraft pilot and member of the Women Airforce Service Pilots
- Bob Robertson, sportscaster
- Brian Sullivan, politician and lawyer
- Isaiah Thomas, professional basketball player
- Pat Tillman, professional football player and U.S. Army soldier
- Morgan Weaver, professional soccer player
