= Jim L. Wells =

Jim L. Wells is currently the Operations Manager for KCBC in Northern California. He previously worked as a radio producer for KATM, 103.3 FM KAT Country 103.3fm in Modesto, California.

Wells started his radio career in 1999 on AM 970 KESP in Modesto, CA. "The Sports Animal". His radio career began as a producer for The Ivie League Show The popular sports-talk radio program was created and hosted by Matthew Ivie. In March 2000, he then joined the D.J. Walker and the Kat Family Morning on KATM. While working on KATM, Wells continued to produce and guest-host 'The Ivie League Show' on KESP

In 2002, after the death of Matthew Ivie (Cancer), Wells became the Program Director of KESP. Wells hosted a daily three-hour morning show The Central Valley Sports Page, until 2004.

2004 - Wells moved-on to KBKY 94.1FM (Fox Sports Radio)Merced, California. At KBKY, Wells teamed up with Matthew Stone on The Afternoon Sports Battle weekday afternoons.

In 2006, Wells returned to KESP as a producer for (PD) Geoff Sheen and JJ Stokes. where he hosted a daily mid-day sports talk show The Jim. In addition, Wells also hosted the popular high school football show The Friday Night Pigskin Party

In addition to his radio duties, Wells was the sports anchor for Modesto based news program The Central Valley Report.

In 2008, Wells left KESP to join Kat Country 103 KATM. He worked as the morning show producer for D.J. Walker in the Morning. "Jungle Jim" to radio listeners, Wells is best known for playing the country trumpet and silly radio stunts.

After leaving KATM in November 2017, Wells landed at KCBC AM770 in Oakdale, CA. Jim also serves as a daily radio host for KBRT in Los Angeles.
