= KLOC =

Radio station in Turlock, California

- Turlock, California; United States
- Broadcast area: Modesto metropolitan area
- Frequency: 1390 kHz
- Branding: Radio Catolica

Programming
- Language: Spanish
- Format: Catholic radio

Ownership
- Owner: La Favorita Radio Network, Inc.

History
- First air date: 1949
- Former call signs: KTUR (1949–1962); KCEY (1962–1986); KYES (1986–1987); KMIX (1987–1994); KCDR (1994–1987); KVIN (1997–2003)

Technical information
- Licensing authority: FCC
- Facility ID: 60426
- Class: B
- Power: 5,000 watts
- Transmitter coordinates: 37°31′48″N 120°41′37″W
- Translator: 105.9 K290CN (Hughson)

Links
- Public license information: Public file; LMS
- Website: unidosporcristoymaria.org/Radio/radio.html

KLOC (1390 AM) is a radio station licensed to Turlock, California, United States, and serving the Modesto metropolitan area. It airs a Spanish-language Catholic format and is owned by La Favorita Radio Network, Inc.

KLOC's transmitter is sited on North Montpelier Road in Montpelier, California. Programming is also heard on low-power FM translator K290CN at 105.9 MHz in Hughson, California.

== History ==
The station signed on as KTUR in 1949. In 1962, the station changed its call letters to KCEY. In 1977, when an FM station was added, a new building went up. KCEY played modern country music and had local news and ABC Radio News.

The station was assigned the KYES call letters on March 1, 1986. On March 23, 1987, the station changed its call sign to KMIX and on November 10, 1997, to KVIN. On April 17, 2003, the station became the current KLOC.
