= Christian Life College =

Private college in Stockton, California

- Former name: Western Apostolic Bible College (1949-1980)
- Motto: Called to Serve, Empowered to Lead
- Type: Private university, Christian college
- Established: 1949; 77 years ago
- Accreditation: WASC
- Religious affiliation: United Pentecostal Church International
- Chairman: Nathaniel K. Haney
- President: Eli M. Lopez
- Dean: Richard Bishop
- Academic staff: 35
- Students: 166
- Location: 9023 West Lane, Stockton, California, US
- Campus: 20 acres (8.1 ha); Urban
- Colors: Gold and blue
- Website: clc.edu

Christian Life College (CLC) is a private four-year nontrinitarian Christian college in Stockton, California, United States. The college was formerly known as Western Apostolic Bible College until 1980.

As of the 2018–2019 school year, the college had 166 students with 52% female and 48% male. The college is the first college endorsed by the UPCI to achieve regional accreditation; it is accredited by the Western Association of Schools and Colleges (WASC).

== History ==
Christian Life College was first established as Western Apostolic Bible College (WABC) by Clyde J. Haney after seeing the need for ministerial training in the Oneness Pentecostal Movement. The beginnings of the college began with a series of short-term institutes in 1949. Clyde J. Haney went on to officially incorporate WABC in 1956. After Clyde Haney was killed in an automobile accident. his son, Kenneth F. Haney became the Senior pastor of Stockton's First United Pentecostal Church (later to be known as Christian Life Center in 1978), and President of WABC. In 1980, Haney changed the name of Western Apostolic Bible College to Christian Life College. In 1994, CLC was granted approval by the State of California's Bureau for Private Postsecondary Education as a degree-granting institution. In 2001 he was elected as the General Superintendent of the United Pentecostal Church International. Kenneth Haney subsequently moved to the UPCI headquarters in St. Louis, Mo.

Upon Kenneth Haney's departure, his son, Nathaniel Haney was elected as the Senior Pastor of Christian Life Center and chairman of the Board of Directors of Christian Life College, while Daniel Segraves served as president of the college. Segraves served as president for five years before moving to St. Louis, Mo. Nathaniel Haney filled the role of both chairman of the board and President until Rev. Eli M. Lopez was elected as president in 2015. Lopez has served in that capacity until present. CLC/WABC has over 6,000 alumni. In July 2019, CLC received regional accreditation from the Western Association of Schools and Colleges, making it the first UPCI endorsed accredited college.

== Academics ==
Christian Life College follows a semester academic term with Fall semester typically starting in mid-August and Spring semester ending in mid-May. The awarding of a bachelor's degree at Christian Life College requires at least 120 semester credits consisting of 60 credits in the degree and concentration, 50 credits in General Education and College Core, and 10 in open electives. Including the various concentrations offered, CLC currently offers a total of six undergraduate degree programs. Requirements for the Bachelor of Arts degree include fulfilling the lower division requirements found in the Associate of Arts degree in the same discipline.

Students are granted access to over 18,000 volumes in the Hogue Library, including a collection of classic academic works, a collection of reference books for theological research and exegesis, and an extensive holding of Oneness Pentecostal theological, ministerial and biographical works, along with materials on a variety of other subjects pertinent to the college's programs.

=== Programs ===
==== Bible and Theology ====
CLC's Bible and Theology program provides students with an exposure to Oneness Pentecostal Theology, instruction to develop skills for preaching and teaching, and a pathway to contribute to scholarly research through theological writing. Topics covered within the program include Christian Apologetics, outreach, Oneness Pentecostal theology, biblical Hebrew and Greek languages for exegesis, ministerial leadership, history of the church, and eschatology.

==== General Ministry ====
The General Ministry program is designed to give students a broad understanding of the bible and an understanding of contemporary ministry expression. The program offers students various concentration tracks that can be coupled with the General Ministry degree including Christian Music, Missiology, Media and Communications, Leadership, and Deaf Ministry.

==== Business Administration ====
The Business Administration program is designed to train individuals who wish to develop a professional discipline with a Christian worldview. Topics covered within the program include leadership, marketing promotions, non-profit management, financial accounting for management, human resources, business ethics, project management, and business and non-profit law.

=== Learning Resource Center ===
The Learning Resource Center (LRC) is designed as an extension of Christian Life College education. The center was established to meet the academic needs of the student body. The LRC comprises the Reading and Writing Center, tutoring services, and the Hogue Library. The Reading and Writing Center offers students guidance in academic writing and reading comprehension, while the tutoring services provide academic support for other areas concerning course materials.

== Student life ==
=== Student Senate ===
The Student Senate is composed of elected leaders within the class cohorts and elected student association team leaders. Class cohorts and student association teams elect a president, vice president, and secretary on a yearly basis. The Student Senate in turn is led by a president, vice president, and secretary also elected on a yearly basis.

== Campus and facilities ==
=== Overview ===
Christian Life College is located on a gated campus of almost 20 acres in Stockton, CA. Of the seven buildings on the campus, five are used almost exclusively by the college. The buildings used predominantly by the college are the Darryl L. Siebold Communications Center, Hogue Library, Student Center, Christian Life Center, and the student dormitories. The campus also includes a large outside pavilion and fireplace and a baseball diamond for student recreation.

==== Darryl L. Siebold Communications Center ====
The 10,000 square foot Darryl L. Siebold Communications Center houses the college's main business office, college bookstore, and KYCC radio network which broadcasts 24 hours a day throughout the Northern and Central San Joaquin Valley and online. As part of the dream of Christian Life College's second president, Kenneth Haney, the radio station's first call letters were “KCJH” in honor of his late father, Clyde J. Haney. In 1997, KCJH added a second station to its network that eventually led to a change in the radio stations call letters to “YCC” meaning “Your Christian Companion”. Though KYCC is a hallmark of the 20-acre campus, it operates independently of Christian Life College.

==== Bookstore ====
The Christian Life College Bookstore is a public Christian bookstore offering a variety of theological works by Oneness Pentecostal authors along with other theological works required for the academic programs.

==== Hogue Library ====
The 12,000 square foot Hogue Library features the college library and the Learning Resource Center. The Hogue Library contains over 18,000 volumes, a computer laboratory, faculty and staff offices, a keyboard lab for music students, and classrooms.

==== Student Center ====
The 10,000-square-foot (930 m^{2}) Student Center houses a dining room capable of seating 300 people along with a furnished student lounge. The Student Center also includes an executive dining room capable of seating 35 people, a modern commercial kitchen, and two 1,200-square-foot (110 m^{2}) apartments occupied by college staff families.

==== Christian Life Center ====
The 25,000-square-foot (2,300 m^{2}) auditorium includes seating for 2,100 people. Although the facility is shared with the Christian Life Center church, the facility is used by the college for chapel worship services, classrooms, and offices throughout the week.

==== Dormitories ====
Dormitories consist of two identical facilities of 32 rooms each. Each room includes a private full bath and twin size bed. Each facility also includes washing machines and dryers for student use.

== See also ==
- United Pentecostal Church International
- Western Association of Schools and Colleges
