= Stockton Early College Academy =

Location
- 349 East Vine Street; Stockton, California 95202; United States; 37.9667°N 121.2894°W

Information
- School type: Public secondary school, Charter school
- Established: 2009
- School district: Stockton Unified School District
- Principal: Kyle Dei Rossi
- Grades: 9–12
- Enrollment: 443 (500 max. capacity)
- Colors: Black & Red
- Mascot: Timber Wolf
- Website: seca.stocktonusd.net

Stockton Early College Academy (SECA), also known as Stockton Unified Early College Academy, is a public four-year charter high school in Stockton, California. It is part of the Stockton Unified School District. The school currently has 443 students enrolled. SECA is currently rated by U.S. News & World Report as California’s 16th top-rated high school and 147th in the nation.

== History ==
SECA was founded in 2009 by then-principal Michael Hall in downtown Stockton, offering a four-year high school curriculum in conjunction with two years’ worth of University of California and California State University-transferable community college credits. During the 2011–2012 academic school year, the school’s administration sought autonomy from Stockton Unified. The school's charter revisions were denied by the district, leading to the departure and replacement of several founding staff members.

Former principal Josh Thom and counselor Andres Uyeda were hired by the district to spearhead administrative operations for the following school year, coinciding with a $6 million USD renovation to upgrade and repurpose a derelict district campus to accommodate more students to the school. SECA's first graduating class of 77 students departed in 2013.

== Academics ==
In 2010, the school’s students achieved an Academic Performance Index score of 884, a record-breaking district high. SECA became the first school in Stockton Unified to break an Academic Performance Index of 900 in 2013; this was also hailed as a county-first. The school has since been nationally rated by U.S. News’ best high schools ranking indices for the years 2015, 2016, 2017, 2018, 2019, and 2020.

100% of students undergo College Board Advanced Placement testing with relevant curricula.

SECA is partnered with San Joaquin Delta College; all enrolled students may obtain up to two years’ worth of CSU and UC-transferable college credits during their four years of attendance.

== Demographics ==
As of the 2020–2021 academic year, SECA’s student body is represented by <1% Native American, 44% Asian, 3% African American, <1% Hawaiian / Pacific Islander, 45% Hispanic, 4% white, and <2% multiracial students, over half of whom are female. 70% of students are eligible for free or reduced lunch.
