= KHOP =

Radio station in Oakdale,(with current studio in Stockton) California

Coordinates: 37.793°N 120.520°W

- Oakdale, California; United States
- Broadcast area: Modesto-Stockton, California
- Frequency: 95.1 MHz
- Branding: KHOP @ 95-1

Programming
- Format: Contemporary Top 40
- Affiliations: Westwood One

Ownership
- Owner: Cumulus Media; (Radio License Holding CBC, LLC)
- Sister stations: KATM, KDJK/KHKK, KESP, KJOY, KWIN/KWNN

History
- First air date: 1979 (as KWLF at 95.3)
- Former call signs: KWLF (1979–1981); KOKQ (1981–1985); KDJK (1985–1996)
- Former frequencies: 95.3 MHz (1979-1980)
- Call sign meaning: K-HOP

Technical information
- Licensing authority: FCC
- Facility ID: 52528
- Class: B
- ERP: 29,500 watts
- HAAT: 193 meters

Links
- Public license information: Public file; LMS
- Webcast: Listen live
- Website: khop.com

KHOP (95.1 FM) is a radio station serving the Modesto and Stockton areas. It is under the ownership of Cumulus Media. KHOP refers to itself as KHOP @ 95-1 or All The Hits. Its studios are in Stockton and its transmitter is located northeast of Oakdale, California.

KHOP plays mostly pop music. It was once referred to as "The Pop Music Channel", but has dropped that slogan in favor of "All the Hits." Prior to the switch to a pop music format, it went through multiple formats including all 80s: Planet 95, and Rock 95 a rock format focusing mostly on hard rock. Before that the station on 95.1 was an alternative music channel and originally it started as a rock station called KDJK out of Oakdale, Calif.
