= KWIN =

Radio station in Stockton, California

KWIN and KWNN
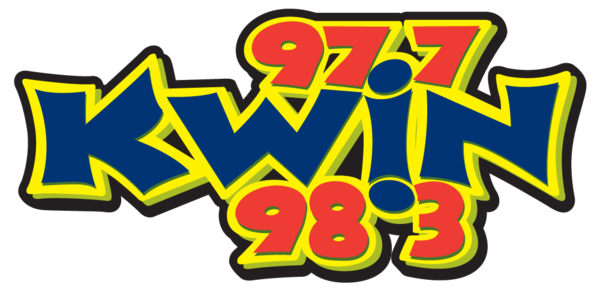

KWIN: Lodi, California; KWNN: Turlock, California; United States
- Broadcast area: Stockton/Modesto/Central Valley
- Frequencies: KWIN: 97.7 MHz; KWNN: 98.3 MHz
- Branding: 97-7 & 98-3 K-WIN

Programming
- Format: Urban contemporary
- Affiliations: Compass Media Networks

Ownership
- Owner: Cumulus Media; (Radio License Holding CBC, LLC)
- Sister stations: KATM, KDJK/KHKK, KESP, KHOP, KJOY, KWNN

History
- First air date: KWIN: 1959; KWNN: 1980
- Former call signs: KWNN: KMIX (1980–1995)
- Call sign meaning: Pronounced "K-Win"

Technical information
- Licensing authority: FCC
- Facility ID: KWIN: 60425; KWNN: 60427
- Class: KWIN: A; KWNN: A
- ERP: KWIN: 6,000 watts; KWNN: 2,000 watts
- HAAT: KWIN: 100 meters (330 ft); KWNN: 119 meters (390 ft)
- Transmitter coordinates: KWIN: 38°4′17″N 121°15′25″W; KWNN: 37°34′46″N 120°50′48″W

Links
- Public license information: KWIN: Public file; LMS; KWNN: Public file; LMS
- Webcast: Listen live
- Website: kwin.com

KWIN (97.7 FM) and KWNN (98.3 FM) is a pair of commercial radio stations serving the Stockton and Modesto sections of California's Central Valley. They simulcast an urban contemporary radio format and are owned by Cumulus Media. KWIN is licensed to Lodi and KWNN is licensed to Turlock. The studios and offices are in Stockton. The transmitter for KWIN is off California State Route 99 at Cora Post Road in Lodi. The transmitter for KWNN is off Geer Road in Hughson.

On air DJs include The Morning Block Party with Lucas, Middays with Lani Q, Afternoons with Jiggy, Nights with Tino Cochino, Danny B. & The Bomb Squad, Late Nights with Q and Overnights with Late Night Slow Jams R Dub and Jeff Bayani.

== History ==
KTUR (later KCEY), signed on in 1949. In 1977, when an FM station was added, a new building went up. K-MIX 98 was automated adult contemporary with DJs recording their shows to give the impression of live broadcasts. In 1995, KMIX-FM became KWNN, simulcasting Rhythmic CHR KWIN.
