= KHKK =

Radio station in Modesto, California

KHKK and KDJK
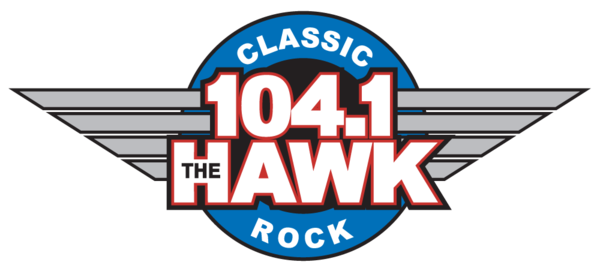

KHKK: Modesto, California; KDJK: Mariposa, California; United States
- Broadcast area: Stockton-Modesto-Central Valley
- Frequencies: KHKK: 104.1 MHz; KDJK: 103.9 MHz
- Branding: 104.1 The Hawk

Programming
- Format: Classic rock
- Affiliations: Las Vegas Raiders Radio Network; Westwood One

Ownership
- Owner: Cumulus Media; (Radio License Holding CBC, LLC)
- Sister stations: KATM, KESP, KHOP, KJOY, KWIN/KWNN

History
- First air date: KHKK: 1949; KDJK: 1992
- Former call signs: KHKK: KTRB-FM (1949–1974); KHOP (1974–1996); KROW (1996); KDJK: KHRA (1989–1992, CP); KHOV (1992–1994); KROW (1994-1996); KHOP (1996)
- Call sign meaning: KHKK: Hawk; KDJK: Derived from KKDJ

Technical information
- Facility ID: KHKK: 11240; KDJK: 11241
- Class: KHKK: B; KDJK: A
- ERP: KHKK: 50,000 watts; KDJK: 71 watts
- HAAT: KHKK: 152 meters (499 ft); KDJK: 624 meters (2,047 ft)
- Transmitter coordinates: KHKK: 37°39′10″N 121°28′38″W; KDJK: 37°32′0″N 120°1′29″W

Links
- Webcast: Listen live
- Website: 104thehawk.com

KHKK (104.1 FM) and KDJK (103.9 FM), known as The Hawk, are a pair of commercial radio stations in the Central Valley of California. They are owned by Cumulus Media and they simulcast a classic rock format. KHKK is licensed to Modesto, California, and KDJK is licensed to Mariposa, California.

The Hawk's studios are on Transworld Drive in Stockton; KHKK's transmitter is off Corral Hollow Road in Tracy, California, while KDJK's transmitter is on Morrisey Lane in Mariposa.

== History ==
The KHKK license has its roots in KTRB-FM, the sister station to KTRB radio. The station went on the air in 1948, and simulcasted its sister AM station. By late 1970, KTRB-FM was programming a combination of AM simulcast, and night time Progressive Rock programming. In May 1973, the station was sold to Pappas Broadcasting, along with its AM sister station. At that time KTRB-FM, relaunched as KHOP. KHOP programmed a combination of simulcast of sister station KTRB (overnight hours and early mornings), brokered religious block programming (early mornings through late afternoons), ethnic block programming (late afternoons through 10:00PM) and late night Jazz (10:00PM-Midnight) from May 1973 through March 1978. In March 1978, KHOP re-launched as an automated, tightly-formatted Album Rock format and identified as "Rock 104." In November 1979, KHOP gradually moved to a live Top 40 format and evolved to full-on CHR as "Stereo 104." The format remained in effect until November 2, 1992. It switched to Album Oriented Rock on November 2, 1992 and was known as Rock 104.

On April 23, 1996, Rock 104 moved to its new frequency at 95.1 FM, and after a few days of an all-Elvis stunt, it switched formats on April 29, 1996 to classic hits and changed its call sign to KROW, Arrow 104.1 "All Rock & Roll Oldies".

On August 5, 1996, KROW became KHKK "The Hawk", retaining the classic hits format. On December 1, 2000, The Hawk moved to a harder-edged classic rock format, while The Bob & Tom Show moved over from its sister station at 95.1 FM. Richard Perry was the Hawk's Program Director, and disc jockey from 9 a.m. to 2 p.m for most of its history until he retired in 2025. He was formerly employed at the legendary, original KDJK (at 95.1 FM) as production director as well as co-host with Beaver Brown on the morning show. Another former KDJk on air personality Randy Maranz has been on The Hawk for decades as well. Jeff Adams is another long time DJ for the station. Former Hawk-ers include Hunter, Kennedy, and John Yazel.

KDJK simulcasts this station on FM frequency 103.9 MHz, serving Mariposa, California.

- The Bob & Tom Show - Weekday Mornings
- Classic Rock Request Lunch - an hour of requests at noon on weekdays
- Get The Led Out - a long set of Led Zeppelin at 7pm every weeknight
- Classic Rock Block Party Weekend - All weekend long, beginning from 6PM on Fridays until 12AM on Mondays. Three songs in a row by a famous classic rock act at the top of each hour.
- Twofer Tuesday - back-to-back songs from each artist on Tuesdays
- Steve Gorman Rock - the Ex- Black Crowes Drummer hosts a show weekday nights
- Sammy Hagar's Top Rock Countdown - Saturday Nights at 10pm
- Las Vegas Raiders Football - During the NFL regular season, the Hawk is one of the 20 stations that broadcast Las Vegas Raiders games.
