= KESP =

- Modesto, California; United States
- Broadcast area: Modesto, California
- Frequency: 970 kHz
- Branding: Sportsradio 970

Programming
- Format: Sports
- Affiliations: Westwood One Sports; Modesto Nuts Minor League Baseball; Pacific Tigers College Basketball

Ownership
- Owner: Cumulus Media; (Radio License Holding CBC, LLC)
- Sister stations: KATM, KDJK/KHKK, KHOP, KJOY, KWIN/KWNN

History
- First air date: November 1, 1951 (as KBOX)
- Former call signs: KBOX (1951–1956); KBEE (1956–1983); KHYV (1983–1988); KOOK (1988–1992); KBEE (1992–1996); KBUL (1996–1998); KANM (1998–2000)
- Call sign meaning: ESPN (former affiliation)

Technical information
- Licensing authority: FCC
- Facility ID: 11233
- Class: B
- Power: 1,000 watts
- Transmitter coordinates: 37°41′22.7″N 120°57′15.8″W

Links
- Public license information: Public file; LMS
- Website: www.sportsradio970.com

KESP (970 AM) is a sports radio station in Modesto, California, United States. The station serves Modesto, Stockton, Lodi, and surrounding communities of the northern San Joaquin Valley. It is owned by Cumulus Media. Its studios are in Stockton, and its transmitter is located in Modesto.

KESP is a member of the San Francisco Giants, San Francisco 49ers, San Jose Sharks, and Golden State Warriors, radio networks. Most of its daily programming, as the call letters implies, came from ESPN Radio, until January 2, 2013, when KESP switched to CBS Sports Radio. It now currently airs the Westwood One Sports Network.

KESP gained its current call sign, and format, in the early 2000s. Other call signs used since it came on the air in 1951 were: KBOX (1951–1956), KBEE (1956–1983), KHYV (1983–1988), KOOK (1988–1992(?)/1996(?)), KBUL (1996–1998), and KANM (1998–2000).

The station was owned by the McClatchy family, which also owned McClatchy Newspapers, publisher of the Modesto Bee. The McClatchy Company later sold the station to Citadel Broadcasting, which merged with Cumulus Media on September 16, 2011.

In a sports-related note, Kevin McClatchy, a member of the publishing family, owned the Pittsburgh Pirates until the team was sold to Bob Nutting in 2007.

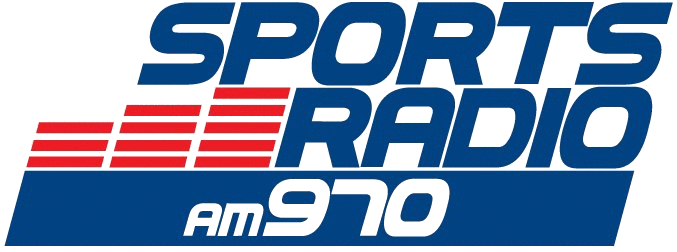
Previous logo

KESP carried Oakland Athletics baseball as an affiliate of the Oakland Athletics Radio Network through the 2024 season. Following the temporary move of the Athletics (A's) to West Sacramento as part of their relocation to Las Vegas, and the move of the team's Sacramento radio broadcasts from KHTK to KSTE, the A's released an affiliate list that did not include KESP. On March 4, 2025, the station announced that it had joined the San Francisco Giants Radio Network.

== Previous logos ==
Logo of ESPN Radio 970 used until 2008

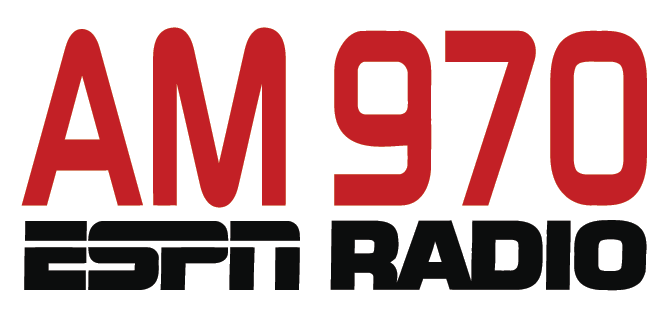
KESP's logo from 2002 to 2012
