= KJOY =

Adult contemporary radio station in Stockton, California

Coordinates: 37.992°N 121.289°W

Stockton, California; United States
- Broadcast area: Central California
- Frequency: 99.3 MHz
- Branding: 99.3 KJOY

Programming
- Format: Adult contemporary
- Affiliations: Westwood One

Ownership
- Owner: Cumulus Media; (Radio License Holding CBC, LLC)
- Sister stations: KATM, KDJK, KESP, KHOP, KHKK, KWIN, KWNN

History
- First air date: June 15, 1968
- Former call signs: KJAX (1968–1989)

Technical information
- Licensing authority: FCC
- Facility ID: 32215
- Class: A
- ERP: 4,000 watts
- HAAT: 98 meters (322 ft)

Links
- Public license information: Public file; LMS
- Webcast: Listen live
- Website: 993kjoy.com

KJOY (99.3 FM) is a commercial radio station licensed to Stockton, California. The station is owned by Cumulus Media and broadcasts an adult contemporary format. Studios and transmitters are located in Stockton.

== History ==
On June 15, 1968, the station first signed on. Its original call sign was KJAX. Owned by Joseph Gamble Stations Inc., it was the FM sister station to KJOY (1280 AM, now KWSX). On November 15, 1989, KJAX changed its callsign to KJOY-FM.

On June 26, 1998, Joseph Gamble Stations sold KJOY to Silverado Broadcasting, headed by Ron Miller, for $3.6 million. In February 2003, Silverado sold four stations, including KJOY, to Citadel Broadcasting for $25.5 million. On March 10, 2011, Cumulus Media purchased Citadel for $2.4 billion. The deal closed on September 16, 2011 following a review of the deal by the Federal Communications Commission and divestitures required to comply with ownership limits.
