= KMIX =

Radio station in Tracy, California

- Tracy, California; United States
- Broadcast area: Stockton, California
- Frequency: 100.9 MHz
- Branding: LA Tricolor 100.9

Programming
- Format: Regional Mexican

Ownership
- Owner: Entravision Communications; (Entravision Holdings, LLC)

History
- First air date: December 14, 1966
- Former call signs: KSRT (1967–1981); KWGF (1981–1983); KYBB (1983–1990); KSGO (1990–1992); KEXX (1992–1995)

Technical information
- Licensing authority: FCC
- Facility ID: 60420
- Class: A
- ERP: 6,000 watts
- HAAT: 100 meters (330 ft)
- Transmitter coordinates: 37°37′29″N 121°23′57″W

Links
- Public license information: Public file; LMS
- Webcast: Listen live
- Website: radiolatricolor.com/stockton-modesto

KMIX (100.9 FM, "La Tricolor 100.9") is a radio station broadcasting a regional Mexican format. Licensed to Tracy, California, United States, it serves the Stockton area. The station is currently owned by Entravision Communications.

== History ==
The station began broadcasting December 14, 1966. For many years, the station was a sister station to KWG. The station's original call sign was KSRT (for Stereo Radio Tracy). From the late 1960s to the early 1970s, the station aired a Spanish language format. In the early to mid 1970s (1973) through the very early 1980s (1981) KSRT aired an album-oriented rock format. On May 6, 1981, the station's call sign was changed to KWGF. In 1983, the station's call sign was changed to KYBB (B-101). From the mid to late 1980s, the station aired an adult contemporary format. By 1989, the station was airing an Oldies format, and on June 26, 1990, the station's call sign was changed to KSGO (Stockton's Golden Oldies). On December 1, 1992, the station's call sign was changed to KEXX (Xtra 101). By 1995, the station's oldies format had evolved to a playlist centered on hits of the 1970s.

KEXX dropped 1970s oldies for country music in 1995, changing its letters to KMIX. By 1997, KMIX was airing a Spanish language format.
