= KATM =

Coordinates: 37.575°N 121.355°W

- Modesto, California; United States
- Broadcast area: Modesto-Stockton, California
- Frequency: 103.3 MHz (HD Radio)
- Branding: Kat Country 103

Programming
- Format: Country
- Affiliations: Westwood One

Ownership
- Owner: Cumulus Media; (Radio License Holding CBC, LLC)
- Sister stations: KDJK/KHKK, KESP, KHOP, KJOY, KWIN/KWNN

History
- First air date: April 3, 1948 (as KBEE-FM)
- Former call signs: KBEE-FM (1948–1992)
- Call sign meaning: KAT (branding) Modesto

Technical information
- Licensing authority: FCC
- Facility ID: 11239
- Class: B
- ERP: 50,000 watts
- HAAT: 152 meters (499 ft)

Links
- Public license information: Public file; LMS
- Webcast: Listen live
- Website: katm.com

KATM (103.3 FM, Kat Country 103) is a commercial radio station in Modesto, California and also heard in the nearby cities of Stockton and Merced. The station is owned by Cumulus Media and airs a country music format. Its studios are in Stockton, and its transmitter is located off South Bird Road in Vernalis, California.

KATM often works with local charities and community organizations providing air time and fundraising opportunities, most notably the Make-A-Wish Foundation, St. Jude Children's Research Hospital, Toys for Tots, the Second Harvest Food Bank, the American Cancer Society and others.

The station hosts a yearly Listener Appreciation Concert. As the concert crowds have grown, the venues have been changed to accommodate the growing number of attendees. The June 2nd show at the Stanislaus County Fairgrounds hosted around 20,000 fans in Turlock, California. In 2011, the Listener Appreciation Concert was held at Weber Point Event Center on the waterfront in Stockton, California.

== History ==
On April 3, 1948, the station first signed on as KBEE-FM. It was one of the first FM stations in Central California, and was owned by The McClatchy Company, which publishes the Modesto Bee newspaper, giving the station its call sign, KBEE. A few years later, in 1951, McClatchy added an AM station, KBEE (970 AM). At first, both stations were simulcast, but through the late 1960s, 70s and 80s, while the AM station carried a full service middle of the road music format, KBEE-FM had a largely automated beautiful music format.

In 1992, the station was purchased by Citadel Broadcasting and moved from easy listening to a hit country format, switching call letters to KATM (soon after the calls were made available after being used by a station in Colorado for about seven years) under the helm of then Brand Manager, Scott Mahalick. Citadel merged with Cumulus Media in 2011. Through the years, KATM has continued as a country music station, and is among the top rated stations in both Modesto and Stockton, with significant listenership in the Merced radio market.

== Past Listener Appreciation Concert (LAC) performers ==
- Blake Shelton
- Taylor Swift
- Craig Morgan
- Eric Church
- The Band Perry
- Lee Brice
- Joe Nichols
- Tracy Lawrence
- Clay Walker
- Jerrod Niemann
- Eli Young Band
- Lauren Alaina
- Mark Chesnutt
- Lee Ann Womack
- Steve Holy
- Montgomery Gentry
- Toby Keith
- Gretchen Wilson
- Rascal Flatts
- Thompson Square
- Parmalee
- Gloriana
- Keith Anderson
- Travis Tritt
- Josh Turner
- Carly Pearce
- Chris Janson
- Locash
- Jordan Davis
- Jimmie Allen
- Mitchell Tenpenny
- Cassadee Pope
- Everette
- Dillon Carmichael

== Program directors ==
- Scott Mahalick was the GM and spearheaded the branding of the "KAT". Mahalick went on to program in San Francisco, Seattle and now is at Portland, Oregon country station KUPL.
- Ed Hill left the station to serve as OM at KUBL in Salt Lake City, Utah, in 1998. Hill left Citadel in 2011 to take on the job as program director of KMPS in Seattle, Washington.
- Randy "Bubba" Black, a native of Manteca, California was a KATM employee, from 1994 to 2011. Black was elevated to mgmt in 1997 and was sent to Reno, NV and then returned to the station after the departure of his mentor Ed Hill. Black had programmed the Bull in Reno and served as program director for the KAT from 1998 until 2011. Black continued the KATM tradition of market dominance during his tenure. Bubba's work was entered and won the Radio Station Of the Year by the CMA, a nationally recognized award, Bubba Black and KATM were also the winners of the prestigious award the ST. Jude Children's Research Hospital Promotion

Of The Year for the promotion The Quest For One Million Pennies netting the charity 36 Million Pennies.

- Nikki Thomas, formerly of WKSF in Asheville, North Carolina and Infinity Broadcasting stations KWYE and KDJK in Fresno, California, came to work for the station as Music Director in 2006 and served as program director after Black left in February 2011 until moving to WIVK Knoxville. Thomas programmed both KATM and WIVK from August 2016 until December 2016 when Andy Winford was brought in as the new program director. KATM was noted in the Congressional Record by Rep. Dennis Cardoza for Community Service, May 15, 2012
- Andy Winford arrived in December 2016 and is the current program director. Winford was formerly the program director of KATS-FM and KIT-AM in Yakima, Washington, the operations manager of KCTR, KMHK, KKBR and KBUL-AM in Billings, Montana, the program director of CHBN/Edmonton, Canada, program director of KKBZ-FM and KHIT-FM in Fresno, California, and the operations manager of KURQ, KSLY & KSTT in San Luis Obispo, California.

== Air staff ==
- Morning Show (5am-10am): DJ Walker in the Morning with Tori D
- Mid-Days (10am-2pm): Andy West
- Afternoon Drive (2pm-7pm): Tony Randall
- Evenings (7pm-12mid):Country Nights with Bev Rainey
- Overnight (12mid-5am):"The Overnight Ride w/Justin Franiak"
- Weekend's/Fill-ins:Tim Cruz
- Weekend's/Fill-ins:Melissa McConnell
- Program Director:Andy Winford

== Awards ==
- KATM won the Country Music Association Medium Market Station of the Year award in 2011. The station received the news via a phone call from CMA Entertainer of the Year Nominee Taylor Swift, October 17, 2011.
- KATM won the Academy of Country Music Medium Market Station of the Year award in 2012.
- KATM received their second Country Music Association "Medium Market Station of the Year" nomination September 3, 2014.
- KATM Morning Show Personalities DJ Walker In The Morning were nominees for Medium Market Broadcast Personalities of the Year September 9, 2015.
- KATM received their third Country Music Association "Medium Market Station of the Year" nomination August 31, 2016
- KATM was nominated in 2018 for the ACM Medium Market Station of the Year Award.
- In 2020 KATM was nominated for both the ACM and CMA Medium Market Radio Station of the Year Awards.
