= KWSX =

Radio station in Stockton, California

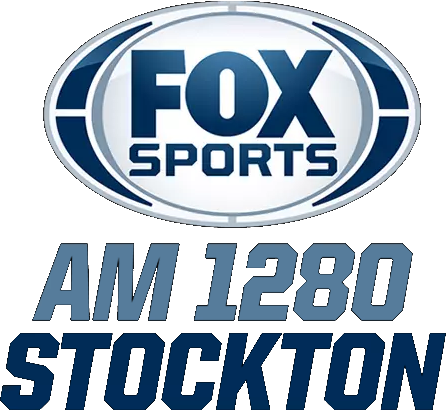
- Stockton, California; United States
- Frequency: 1280 kHz
- Branding: Fox Sports AM 1280

Programming
- Format: Sports
- Network: Fox Sports Radio
- Affiliations: Fresno State Bulldogs; Las Vegas Raiders; Pacific Tigers; Stockton Ports; Westwood One Sports

Ownership
- Owner: iHeartMedia, Inc.; (iHM Licenses, LLC)
- Sister stations: KFIV, KJSN, KMRQ, KOSO, KQOD

History
- First air date: 1947
- Former call signs: KXOB (1947–1956); KJOY (1956–1989); KJAX (1989–1999); KUYL (1999–2005)
- Call sign meaning: Backronym for former "K-6" branding

Technical information
- Licensing authority: FCC
- Facility ID: 32214
- Class: B
- Power: 1,000 watts
- Transmitter coordinates: 37°58′58″N 121°13′46″W

Links
- Public license information: Public file; LMS
- Webcast: Listen live (via iHeartRadio)
- Website: foxsportsam1280.iheart.com

KWSX (1280 AM) is a commercial radio station licensed to Stockton, California, United States, and serving much of San Joaquin County. The station has a sports format and has been owned by iHeartMedia, Inc. and its predecessors since 1996. KWSX broadcasts the national Fox Sports Radio network for most of the week in addition to play-by-play coverage of local college and professional sports teams, including University of the Pacific men's basketball and Stockton Ports.

Founded in 1947 as KXOB, the station had music formats for much of its early history. It was owned by Joseph Gamble Stations for much of the 1950s through 1990s, during which the station changed its call sign to KJOY in 1956 and KJAX in 1989. In 1992, KJAX dropped music to be a full-time news/talk station. The Gamble company sold KJAX in 1996, when the station began the first of several stints simulcasting the talk format of Modesto co-owned station KFIV.

In 1999, the station became KUYL, with a change to a Christian religious format following in 2002. Then in 2005, the station picked up its current KWSX call sign, and in early 2006, KWSX changed its religious format to a conservative talk format simulcast with KFIV. In 2018, KWSX adopted its current sports format.

== History ==
=== KXOB (1946–1956) ===
On December 17, 1946, founding company Valley Broadcasting Company (VBC) was granted a construction permit to put a new AM station on the air in Stockton at 1280 with 1,000 watts, directional to the west at night. This new AM station would sign on in the spring of 1947 with the call sign KXOB. The station originally was part of the Mutual Broadcasting System. VBC also owned KXOA in Sacramento and later KXOC in Chico. Other early programming on KXOB included a weekly public affairs program produced with the local Chamber of Commerce, Make Stockton a Better Place to Live, and nationally syndicated college football broadcasts sponsored by the Tide Water Associated Oil Company.

Valley Broadcasting sold KXOB in 1952 to a group led by Clem John Randau, a newspaper and radio executive who was owned a minority stake in WNEW in New York City and recently resigned from the Federal Civil Defense Administration, for $200,000. Randau operated KXOB out of the Hotel Stockton. KXOB began broadcasting College of the Pacific football in 1952.

Then in 1953, Randau sold KXOB for $207,000 to Joseph E. Gamble, founder of the company Joseph Gamble Stations.

=== KJOY (1956–1989) ===
On April 1, 1956, KXOB changed its call sign to KJOY. KJOY celebrated its new identity with a live broadcast from the Hotel Stockton lobby, featuring guest DJ Don Sherwood from San Francisco. Branded "K-Joy", the new station had the slogan, "The smile on your dial." After Gamble died of a heart attack, general manager Ort J. Lofthus became president of Gamble Broadcasting in December 1963.

Branded "The Great 128", KJOY had a Top 40 format for much of the 1960s and 1970s. In the spring of 1971, the new syndicated show American Top 40 reportedly increased KJOY's ratings by nearly 125 percent.

Don Imus, who would go on to host the national Imus in the Morning show, hosted the KJOY morning show briefly in 1969. By the mid-1970s, KJOY joined the ABC Entertainment Network. The Broadcasting Cable Yearbook 1981 indicated that KJOY had a "[contemporary] with oldies" music format.

=== KJAX (1989–1999) ===
After over 30 years as KJOY, the station became KJAX on November 15, 1989. The call sign was originally held by an AM station (1150 kHz) in Santa Rosa, CA, in the 1960s (White's Radio Log). As late as 1991, KJAX had a full service format featuring adult contemporary music. But in 1992, KJAX dropped music to be a full news/talk station. Nearly four decades of ownership by the Joseph Gamble company ended in 1996 when Community Pacific Broadcasting bought KJAX and changed it to a simulcast of Modesto news/talk station KFIV. Also around 1996, KJAX began broadcasting University of the Pacific men's basketball.

In 1997, Pacific Star Communications bought KJAX from Community Pacific Broadcasting. Pacific Star Communications was renamed Capstar Broadcasting in 1998 and would eventually be acquired by Clear Channel Communications, which was renamed iHeartMedia in 2014.

=== KUYL (1999–2005) ===
On December 9, 1999, KJAX became KUYL. KUYL changed from news/talk to a Christian format branded "The Lighthouse 1280" in 2002.

From 2000 to 2004, KUYL was the radio home of minor league baseball team Stockton Ports, after which the game broadcasts moved to KSTN.

=== KWSX (2005–present) ===
KUYL changed its call sign to KWSX on December 1, 2005. On January 2, 2006, KWSX changed its format from religious to a talk format branded "K-6" simulcast with KFIV "K-5" in Modesto, featuring a local morning show hosted by program director Bill Mick, formerly of WMMB in Melbourne, Florida. The K-5/K-6 simulcast also included nationally syndicated conservative talk shows including The Rush Limbaugh Show, The Sean Hannity Show, and The Savage Nation. From 2007 to 2015, Dave Bowman (formerly Dave Diamond) was the local afternoon drive host for KFIV/KWSX.

In 2008, KWSX began broadcasting San Jose State University football. In 2009, KWSX began broadcasting the Armstrong & Getty show from Sacramento sister station KSTE in mornings. KWSX added two more local sports teams to its programming in 2010, the Stockton Ports for the second time and Stockton Thunder minor league hockey team.

KWSX began another simulcast with KFIV on September 23, 2013, branded "Power Talk" featuring many of the same conservative talk shows as before including Beck, Limbaugh, and Hannity. Trevor Carey replaced Bowman as afternoon drive host in February 2015. Dan Conry became afternoon drive host in July 2016.

In June 2018, KWSX dropped sister station's KFIV simulcast and became an affiliate of Fox Sports Radio branded as "Fox Sports AM 1280".

KWSX's final broadcast of San Jose State football was on November 30, 2019. After the season, KWSX was not included in the San Jose State radio network. KWSX then signed a contract extension for University of the Pacific basketball broadcasts on December 2, 2020.

On July 8, 2021, KWSX signed a contract to be the Stockton affiliate of the Fresno State Bulldogs football radio network.

== Programming ==
KWSX broadcasts the Fox Sports Radio national network most hours and simulcasts CK on Sports from KCBL in Fresno on weekday afternoons. In addition, KWSX broadcasts live play-by-play of local college and professional sports teams, including University of the Pacific men's basketball and Fresno State football. Since 2018, KWSX has been part of the Oakland (later Las Vegas) Raiders radio network. KWSX also broadcasts local minor league sports teams, the Stockton Ports in baseball and Stockton Heat in hockey.

On the national level, KWSX also broadcasts Westwood One Sports' syndicated broadcasts such as NFL on Westwood One Sports.

== Technical information ==
Although licensed to Stockton, KWSX has its studios in Modesto. KWSX broadcasts at 1,000 watts day and night from a transmitter located in northeast Stockton.
