= Fred C. Beyer High School =

Location
- 1717 Sylvan Avenue; Modesto, California; United States; 37°41′25″N 120°57′59″W

Information
- School type: Public, High school
- Established: 1972; 54 years ago
- School district: Modesto City Schools
- Principal: Sarah Cox
- Teaching staff: 74.61 (FTE)
- Grades: 9–12
- Enrollment: 1,590 (2023-2024)
- Student to teacher ratio: 21.31
- Campus: Suburban
- Colors: Red; White; Blue
- Mascot: Patriot
- Yearbook: The Patriot
- Website: beyer.mcs4kids.com

Fred C. Beyer High School is a high school in Modesto, California, located in the Stanislaus County.

== Facilities ==
Although when it was opened in 1972 to an enrollment of 975, Beyer was originally designed to serve approximately 2000 students. By the time the first class of freshman had advanced to seniority, enrollment was about 1800. With the addition of numerous portable buildings, the number of enrolled students was as high as 3150, but since Enochs High School opened, enrollment has returned to 1800.

When built, Beyer was on the outskirts of the city, in northeast Modesto. In anticipation of the 1976 United States Bicentennial, the Patriots were chosen as the school's mascot, and the school colors chosen as red, white, and blue.

Beyer High was intended to incorporate the latest advances in the science of education, the most prominent of which was Daily Demand Scheduling (DDS). The DDS or Modular Scheduling as it was called was controversial and ultimately was a dismal failure. It gave students the ability to arrange their class schedule each day. Oversight of the student scheduling and meeting class requirements was not tracked closely by the Beyer Staff and consequently many students failed to meet graduation requirements. Simply put, if a student liked a particular class, then they could schedule the entire day in that class. Sadly, there was never even one apology from the Modesto City School Board to all the students that failed to graduate high school due to their short-sighted desire to be different, regardless of the impact it had on many students that were used as guinea pigs. DDS was terminated in 1981-82 school year by a decision of the Modesto City School Board of Trustees, due to the outcry from parents and past students.

== Debate and Competitive Speech Teams ==
Under the tutelage of Ron Underwood, Beyer's competitive speech and debate teams and individual competitors won numerous state and national awards in the National Forensics League.

== Athletics ==
Beyer High School is part of the Modesto Metropolitan Conference. The school has teams for several sports, including football, baseball, basketball, cross-country running, and golf.

=== Wrestling ===
Coached by Doug Severe, Beyer High has had several wrestlers place at the California Interscholastic Federation (CIF) State Wrestling Championships.

== FIRST Robotics Team ==
Since 2012, Beyer has offered an extracurricular robotics club which has participated in the FIRST Robotics Competition (FRC) going by the name of the Iron Patriots. Their FRC team number is 4135, and the Iron Patriots have participated in the FIRST World Championship five times. The team has won many awards at regional competitions, such as the FIRST Impact Award, the most prestigious award at FIRST. This award was acquired for their efforts at the Sacramento Regional in 2025 which hosted the FRC game Reefscape. Receiving the Impact Award automatically qualified the Iron Patriots for the FIRST Championship in Houston, Texas, that year.

== Notable alumni ==
- Eric Bell, MLB player (1985–1993)
- Daniel Da Prato, college football coach
- Ginger Gonzaga - actress, comedian - Class of 2001
- Timothy Olyphant – class of 1986, Primetime Emmy-nominated actor
- Jeremy Renner – class of 1989, Oscar-nominated actor
- David Ho - class of 1990, Climate Scientist and Professor
- Joel N. Ward – foreign currency trader
- Michelle Mello – lawyer and professor

== Notable faculty ==
1975 Beyer football team, coach Dean Laun, (nicknamed, the Laun Mower)
