= Robert McHenry (rancher) =

American politician (1827–1890)

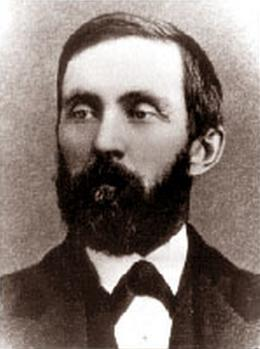
- Born: Robert Henry Brewster; July 23, 1827; Cambridge, Vermont, U.S.
- Died: June 24, 1890 (aged 62); Modesto, California, U.S.
- Occupations: Rancher, banker, businessman
- Spouse: Matilda Hewitt (m. 1859–1890)
- Children: Oramil McHenry

Robert McHenry (born Robert Henry Brewster; July 23, 1827 – June 24, 1890) was an American rancher, politician, and banker noted for his residence, the McHenry Mansion.

== Early life ==
Born in Cambridge, Lamoille County, Vermont, McHenry was a direct descendant of William Brewster, a Mayflower passenger who later became a leader and preacher in Plymouth Colony. McHenry's father was Leonard Brewster, and his younger brother was Leonard Oramil Brewster. His family moved from Vermont to Ohio in 1833, where he enlisted in the Army in 1846 but later deserted during the Mexican–American War. In 1859, he married Matilda Margaret Hewitt (1838-1896) of Farmington, California, the daughter of Irishman Samuel Hewitt. Their first and only son, Oramil McHenry, was born in 1861 on the family's Bald Eagle Ranch.

== Later life and death ==
When Modesto, California, was established, McHenry bought property at 15th and I streets there for the purpose of building his new residence, which would be closer to his work as cashier of the Modesto Bank. The house, called the "McHenry Mansion," was described by local newspapers as one of the finest residences ever built in Modesto at the time.

Robert and Matilda McHenry became prime benefactors of Modesto as they contributed to the construction of the First Presbyterian Church of Modesto and the McHenry Library.

Robert McHenry died of a stroke in 1890 in Modesto and is buried in Acacia Memorial Park in Modesto.

Robert McHenry's son, Oramil, moved into the McHenry Mansion after the death of his mother Matilda. Oramil lived there with his wife Louise and their three children, Robert, Albert and Ora Louise. Oramil also built the Bald Eagle Ranch House at the Bald Eagle Ranch outside of town. Oramil and Louise McHenry divorced in 1901. In 1902 Oramil married Myrtie Conneau and they had one child, Merle, in 1903. Merle and his wife, Marcella Bricca, had two sons: Martin (1932-2013) and Malcolm. Martin C. McHenry was survived by his wife, Patricia; children Michael, Christopher, Timothy, Jeffrey, Paul, Kevin, William, Monica, Martin C. Jr., and the late Mary Ann; fifteen grandchildren; and two great-grandchildren.
