= KFIV =

Radio station in Modesto, California

- Modesto, California; United States
- Frequency: 1360 kHz
- Branding: Power Talk 1360

Programming
- Format: Talk radio
- Affiliations: Fox News Radio; Premiere Networks; Westwood One; Stanford Cardinal

Ownership
- Owner: iHeartMedia, Inc.; (iHM Licenses, LLC)
- Sister stations: KJSN, KMRQ, KOSO, KQOD, KWSX

History
- First air date: March 20, 1950
- Former call signs: KMOD (1950–1957); KFIV (1957–1984); KZUN (1984–1985); KFIV (1985–1989); KASH (1989–1991)
- Call sign meaning: Former "K-5" branding

Technical information
- Licensing authority: FCC
- Facility ID: 12959
- Class: B
- Power: 4,000 watts (day); 950 watts (night)
- Transmitter coordinates: 37°41′22.7″N 120°57′15.8″W
- Repeater: 96.7 KMRQ-HD2 (Riverbank)

Links
- Public license information: Public file; LMS
- Webcast: Listen live (via iHeartRadio)
- Website: powertalk1360.iheart.com

KFIV (1360 AM, "Power Talk 1360") is a commercial radio station licensed to Modesto, California, United States. Owned by iHeartMedia, it has a talk radio format as a partial simulcast with KALZ in Fresno and KRZR in Visalia. KFIV's studios and offices are on Lancey Drive in Modesto, while the transmitter is on Sylvan Avenue near Oakdale Road in Modesto.

Founded in 1950 as KMOD, the station became KFIV in 1957 and had a hit music format branded "K-5" for much of its early years. From 1989 to 1991, the station was KASH and had a business news format. KFIV returned to its present call sign in 1991 and began broadcasting a news/talk format around 1994. Clear Channel Communications, predecessor to iHeartMedia, bought KFIV in 2000.

== History ==
The station signed on the air on March 20, 1950, as KMOD, a 1,000-watt station owned by Radio Modesto, Inc. KMOD was a network affiliate of ABC Radio and broadcast popular ABC programs such as The Lone Ranger and commentaries by Paul Harvey and Walter Winchell. KMOD's studios were once located in the Hotel Covell prior to moving to Orangeburg Avenue and Oakland Road in 1953.

Among early programming on KMOD were early morning shows in foreign languages including Portuguese, Italian, and Spanish; popular and country music; and a Saturday afternoon program featuring the music of Glenn Miller. The Billboard observed in 1954 that KMOD DJ Gene Williams played "good danceable instrumentals" on his program.

In 1957, Radio Modesto sold KMOD to the Finley Broadcasting Company for $170,000. KMOD became KFIV on May 5, 1957 and was sold by Finley to K-Fiv, Inc. in 1959 for nearly $103,000. Branded "K-5", KFIV was a Top 40 station into the 1980s.

KFIV increased its power from 1,000 to 5,000 watts in 1965. Kilibro Broadcasting bought KFIV for $475,000 in 1966. Kilibro founded a KFIV-FM sister station in 1977. In 1982, the KFIV stations were part of a four-station, $5.7 million sale from Kilibro and Monterey Peninsula Communications to Community Pacific Broadcasting. The station became KZUN, "Modesto’s Country Cousin" station featuring popular country and western music in 1984. KZUN was unsuccessful against established country stations KTRB and KMIX AM and FM.

The station became KFIV again in September 1985. KZUN changed its call letters back to KFIV and its format back to Adult Contemporary but this time they utilized the Satellite Music Network's Starstation AC. In 1987, KFIV dropped Adult Contemporary and went to Contemporary Hit Radio which they simulcast on their FM sister station, KFIV-102.3. The call sign changed to KASH on March 17, 1989. KASH changed from music to business news and talk and joined the Mutual Broadcasting System.

Logo of Power Talk 1360 KFIV prior to 2002.

The station became KFIV again on February 22, 1991 and retained its previous business format. By 1994, KFIV became a standard news/talk station. Community Pacific Broadcasting purchased Stockton station KJAX (later KWSX) in 1996 and made KJAX a full-time simulcast of KFIV.

Logo of 1360 AM News/Talk KFIV from 2002 to 2006.

After 50 years of local ownership, KFIV was acquired by Clear Channel Communications, the forerunner to today's iHeartMedia, Inc., in 2000. KFIV was branded "Power Talk 1360 KFIV" around 2001. By 2003, KFIV had a local morning show along with syndicated talk shows including The Rush Limbaugh Show, Dr. Laura, and The Savage Nation.

Logo of the "K5/K6" simulcast with KWSX in Stockton in late 2006.

In 2006, KFIV and KWSX began a new simulcast branded "K-5 and K-6" after KWSX changed from a religious to news/talk format and introduced a new morning show hosted by Bill Mick. Dave Bowman (formerly Dave Diamond) replaced Mick as morning host for KFIV/KWSX in 2007 and moved to afternoons before resigning in 2015.

Logo of the "K5" simulcast with KWSX from 2006 to 2008.

The KFIV/KWSX simulcast was rebranded "Power Talk" in September 2013. Trevor Carey replaced Bowman as afternoon drive host in February 2015. Dan Conry became afternoon drive host in July 2016.

In June 2018, KWSX dropped the KFIV simulcast and became a Fox Sports Radio affiliate.

== Programming ==
KFIV features a local talk show in afternoon drive time, hosted by Mike Douglass; Trevor Carey and John Gerardi from co-owned KALZ in Fresno are also featured. The rest of the weekday schedule is made up of nationally syndicated conservative talk shows. KFIV broadcasts hourly updates from Fox News Radio.

KFIV also broadcasts some sports coverage, such as NFL on Westwood One Sports. KFIV once carried San Jose State University Spartans football in 2005, 2008, and from 2012 to 2019.
