= Modesto Symphony Orchestra =

Modesto Symphony Orchestra (MSO)
- Orchestra
- Founded: 1931
- Concert hall: Gallo Center for the Arts
- Website: www.modestosymphony.org

The Modesto Symphony Orchestra (MSO) is an American orchestra based in Modesto, California. Founded in 1931, the MSO plays its concerts at the Gallo Center.

The current music director is Nicholas Hersh, who was appointed in August 2023.

== History ==
When the Modesto Symphony Orchestra (MSO) gave its first concert in 1931, Modesto had a population of 17,000 and was the smallest town in the United States to have a symphony orchestra.

A letter sent to musicians in December 1929 read:

We wish to organize an orchestra to be known as the Modesto Symphony Orchestra. With your cooperation and assistance, I believe we will be the only city of its size in the United States that can boast of having a symphony orchestra. We aim to give several concerts this winter and play the best there is in music."

In 1977, the MSO became a fully professional ensemble. The 2025–26 Season marked the Modesto Symphony Orchestra's 95th Season.
