= Al Autry =

American baseball player (1952–2022)

- Pitcher
- Born: February 29, 1952; Modesto, California, U.S.
- Died: February 25, 2022 (aged 69); El Dorado Hills, California, U.S.
- Batted: Right Threw: Right

MLB debut
- September 14, 1976, for the Atlanta Braves

Last MLB appearance
- September 14, 1976, for the Atlanta Braves

MLB statistics
- Win–loss record: 1–0
- Earned run average: 5.40
- Strikeouts: 3
- Stats at Baseball Reference

Teams
- Atlanta Braves (1976)

Albert Autry (February 29, 1952 – February 25, 2022) was an American professional baseball right-handed pitcher, who played in Major League Baseball (MLB) for the 1976 Atlanta Braves.

Autry attended Grace M. Davis High School in Modesto, California and was drafted by the Kansas City Royals in the fourth round (91st overall) of the 1969 Major League Baseball draft, and started playing Minor League Baseball (MiLB) with the Winnipeg Goldeyes of the Northern League.

On September 14, 1976, Autry made his big league debut, as the home-team Atlanta Braves‘ starting pitcher against the Houston Astros, at Fulton County Stadium. He pitched five innings, gave up four hits, three earned runs, and struck out three batters, while being credited with the win in a 4–3 Braves victory, in what would be his only appearance in the major leagues. He would be only one of two players since the end of World War II to have started and got credited for the win in his lone MLB appearance. Chris Saenz accomplished the same feat in 2004 pitching for the Milwaukee Brewers. Autry has stated in numerous interviews that a single incident where a sarcastically criticized his teammate and best friend Rick Camp for making an error in the following spring training was misinterpreted by Braves manager Dave Bristol as poor sportsmanship and essentially blackballed Autry from the major league roster. He was sent down to AAA Richmond and eventually traded to the St. Louis Cardinals, but failed to make the major league roster of either team and retired from professional baseball after the 1978 season.

Autry was diagnosed with progressive supranuclear palsy in his later years and died on February 25, 2022, just four days shy of his 70th birthday.
