= Modesto City Schools =

School district in California, United States

Location
- 426 Locust St; Modesto, California 95351 Modesto CA United States

District information
- Motto: "Every student matters, Every moment counts."
- Grades: K–12
- Established: 1871
- Superintendent: Dr. Vanessa Buitrago

Other information
- Website: www.monet.k12.ca.us/district

Modesto City School District is a public school district based in Stanislaus County, California, United States, with an enrollment of approximately 32,000 students. Founded in 1871, the district consists of an elementary district and a high school district with a common administration. Seven other elementary school districts, Empire Union, Hart-Ransom Union, Paradise, Salida Union, Shiloh, Stanislaus Union, and Sylvan Union, feed into Modesto City Schools at the high school level.

The district comprises 22 elementary schools (grades K–6), 5 middle schools (grades 7–8), 9 high schools (grades 9–12), and an alternative-education program.

== Boundary ==
In addition to Modesto, Modesto City Schools also serve sections of Ceres and Riverbank and the CDPs of Airport, Bret Harte, Bystrom, Del Rio, Empire, Riverdale Park, Rouse, Salida and West Modesto.

== Schools ==
=== High schools ===
- Fred C. Beyer High School
- Grace M. Davis High School
- Thomas Downey High School
- James C. Enochs High School
- Joseph A. Gregori High School
- Peter Johansen High School
- Modesto High School
- Elliott Alternative Education Center

=== Middle schools ===
- Evelyn Hanshaw Middle School
- La Loma Junior High School
- Mark Twain Junior High School
- Roosevelt Junior High School
- TUOLUMNE (TK-8)

=== Elementary schools ===
- Elihu Beard Elementary School
- Bret Harte Elementary School
- Burbank Elementary School
- El Vista Elementary School
- Enslen Elementary School
- Catherine Everett Elementary School
- Fairview Elementary School
- Franklin Elementary School
- John Fremont Elementary School
- William Garrison Elementary School
- Kirschen Elementary School
- Lakewood Elementary School
- James Marshall Elementary School
- Alberta Martone Elementary School
- John Muir Elementary School
- Robertson Road Elementary School
- Rose Avenue Elementary School
- Shackelford Elementary School
- Sonoma Elementary School
- Tuolumne Elementary School
- Wilson Elementary School

=== Adult/alternative ===
- Elliott Alternative Programs
- Elliott Continuation School
- Pearson Education Center
