= KJSN =

- Modesto, California; United States
- Broadcast area: Central California
- Frequency: 102.3 MHz (HD Radio)
- Branding: Sunny 102.3

Programming
- Format: Adult contemporary
- Subchannels: HD2: British Invasion
- Affiliations: Compass Media Networks; Premiere Networks

Ownership
- Owner: iHeartMedia, Inc.; (iHM Licenses, LLC)
- Sister stations: KFIV, KMRQ, KOSO, KQOD, KWSX

History
- First air date: July 4, 1977
- Former call signs: KITA (CP, 1975–1977); KFIV-FM (1977–1989)
- Call sign meaning: "Sunny"

Technical information
- Licensing authority: FCC
- Facility ID: 12960
- Class: A
- ERP: 6,000 watts
- HAAT: 88 meters (289 ft)
- Transmitter coordinates: 37°40′50″N 120°55′26″W

Links
- Public license information: Public file; LMS
- Webcast: Listen live (via iHeartRadio); HD2: Listen live (via iHeartRadio)
- Website: sunny102fm.iheart.com

KJSN (102.3 FM) is a commercial radio station licensed to Modesto, California, United States, known as "Sunny 102.3." Owned by iHeartMedia, Inc., it broadcasts an adult contemporary format, with studios and transmitter both located separately in Modesto, with its studios on Lancey Drive and its transmitter on Hawaiian Petrel Avenue.

== History ==
The station first signed on as KFIV-FM on July 4, 1977, with a Top 40 format. This was the station that was "portrayed" in the George Lucas film American Graffiti, where Wolfman Jack was supposedly broadcasting from. It was a very popular station in Modesto and was part of youth culture there, until its change to an adult contemporary format in late 1988. In 1989, the station became its present KJSN.
