= James C. Enochs High School =

Location
- 3201 Sylvan Ave. Modesto, California
- 37.6902°N 120.9355°W

Information
- School type: Public
- Opened: 2006
- School district: Modesto City Schools
- Principal: Justin Woodbridge
- Teaching staff: 102.28 (FTE)
- Grades: 9-12
- Enrollment: 2,369 (2023–2024)
- Student to teacher ratio: 23.16
- Colors: Black and Vegas gold
- Mascot: Eagle
- Website: www.mcs4kids.com/enochs

James C. Enochs High School is a high school in Modesto, California. It is a member of the Central California Athletic League CCAL and has multiple MMC championship titles from the prior athletic league. The school is locally known for having the highest academic performance index of any high school in Stanislaus County, with an API of 820 in 2011. The school has four "career pathway programs": Cinema and Graphic Arts, Software & Systems Development, Forensic/Biotech Science, and Pre-Vet Science.

== History ==
The school was constructed with funding from Measure T, passed in 2001 by Modesto voters. The bond provided $65 million to build both Enochs High and Joseph Gregori High School in Modesto. However, when Enochs opened in 2006, it had already cost $101.4 million to build.

Enochs High is named for James C. Enochs, superintendent of Modesto City Schools from 1986 to 2004.

The school added a swimming pool in the fall of 2014.

In 2017, Enochs earned a silver medal from U.S. News & World Report for the magazine's Best High Schools ranking, placing 496th in California and 2,594th in the United States.

== Extracurricular activities ==
=== Athletics ===
Enochs competes in the Modesto Metro Conference (MMC) in the following sports:

- Baseball
- Basketball
- Cross country
- Football
- Golf
- Pickleball
- Soccer
- Softball
- Swimming
- Track and field
- Tennis
- Volleyball
- Wrestling
- Water polo

=== Performing arts ===
The Enochs Instrumental Music and Color Guard program includes three concert bands (Wind Ensemble I, Symphonic band, and Concert Band), a jazz band, a pep band, a marching band, an orchestra, winter guard, winter percussion ensemble and also once included a winter winds group.

The James C. Enochs High School Marching Band and Color Guard competes in the Western Band Association (WBA) in Class AAA and in the Northern California Band Association (NCBA) in Class AAA. The group has advanced to WBA Grand Championships twice, once in 2014 in Class AA and once in 2017 in Class AAA.

The Winter Guard and Winter Percussion Ensemble compete in and host competitions for the Central Valley Guard and Percussion Circuit (CVGPC), and they compete as Scholastic A ensembles with Winter Guard International (WGI). The percussion ensemble has also competed in the Northern California Percussion Alliance (NCPA). The group held a record breaking winter percussion season in 2018 in the Scholastic Open class, going undefeated at every competition.
