= KQOD =

- Stockton, California; United States
- Broadcast area: Stockton; Modesto
- Frequency: 100.1 MHz (HD Radio)
- Branding: Mega 100

Programming
- Format: rhythmic AC-leaning classic hip hop

Ownership
- Owner: iHeartMedia, Inc.; (iHM Licenses, LLC)
- Sister stations: KFIV; KJSN; KMRQ; KOSO

History
- First air date: January 24, 1980
- Call sign meaning: "Oldies" (former format)

Technical information
- Licensing authority: FCC
- Facility ID: 9134
- Class: A
- ERP: 6,000 watts
- HAAT: 100 meters (330 ft)
- Transmitter coordinates: 37°57′27″N 121°17′33″W

Links
- Public license information: Public file; LMS
- Webcast: Listen live (via iHeartRadio)
- Website: mega100fm.iheart.com

KQOD (100.1 FM) is a commercial radio station in Stockton, California. It carries a rhythmic AC-leaning classic hip hop radio format, and is owned by iHeartMedia, Inc. KQOD's studios and offices are on Lancey Drive in Modesto.

KQOD has an effective radiated power (ERP) of 6,000 watts, its transmitter is on Arata Road in Stockton. The station broadcasts in the HD Radio hybrid format.

== History ==
The station first signed on as KFMR, on January 24, 1980. It was owned by Carson Communications and aired an easy listening country music format.

On November 23, 1994, it changed its call letters to KQOD, and aired an oldies music format.

In 1999, the station was acquired by San Antonio-based Clear Channel Communications, the forerunner to today's iHeartMedia, Inc.
