= Downtown Modesto, Modesto, California =

Historical townsite

Coordinates: 37.64117°N 120.99603°W

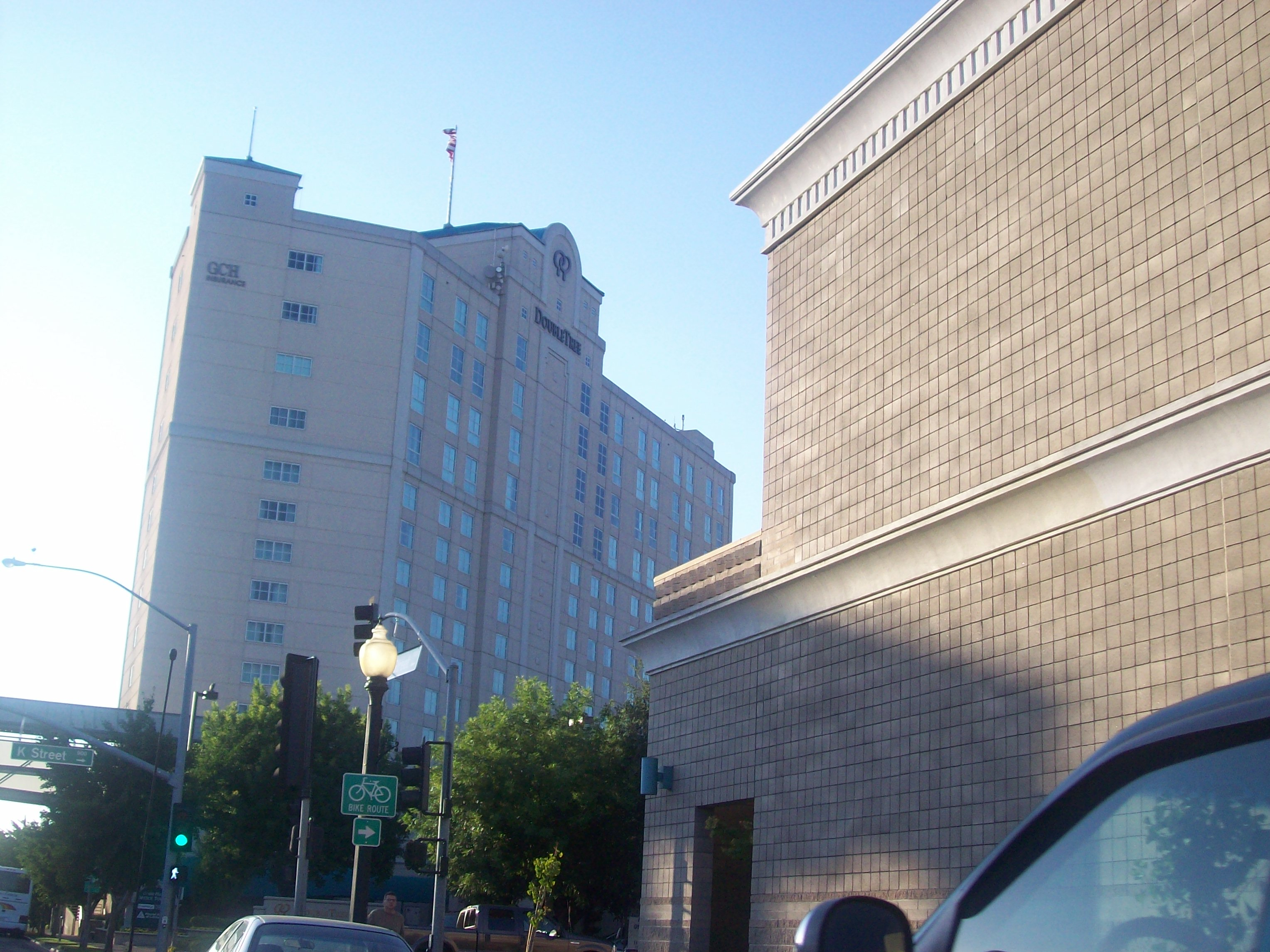
Downtown Modesto featuring the skyline of the DoubleTree Hotel (left; the city's tallest building) and the Brenden Theatres (right) on 9th street.

Downtown Modesto attractions.

Downtown Modesto is the principal administrative area and historic townsite of Modesto, California. Measuring a square mile, it is bordered by Needham and Downey Streets to the north, Washington Street to the west, Sierra Drive and Morton Boulevard to the south, and Morton Boulevard and Burney Street to the east. The area has an approximate population of 3,138, and is bisected by California State Routes 99, 108, and 132.

== Early history ==
In 1870, when the location for Modesto was chosen, it was a square-mile townsite with streets parallel to the Southern Pacific railroad. The townsite's outer streets were aligned from north, east, west, and south, and its interior streets and alleyways were aligned with the railroad, which ran diagonally. They ran from northwest and southeast, and northeast and southwest.

One of the first grand homes to be built on the site was the McHenry Mansion, built in 1883 for Robert McHenry and his wife Matilda Hewitt McHenry. It was styled in the Victorian-Italianate manner and was designed and built by Stockton architect-contractor Jeremiah Robinson.

By the dawn of the 1900s, early Modesto's streets were paved with asphalt.

In 2016, a new non-profit, property-based assessment district was formed by a vote of a weighted majority of property owners to provide long-term funding for revitalization efforts that would benefit the downtown community, its businesses, properties, and future development of downtown Modesto.

Downtown Modesto is home to two performing arts theaters, two movie theaters, a children's museum, and historic museums.

== Residential Area ==
The residential area is south of 5th Street and east of G Street. Many Victorian, Italianate, Craftsman, and Mission style homes are proudly mixed with elegant commerces in this lively modern downtown.
