= Peter Johansen High School =

Location
- 641 Norseman Dr. Modesto, California
- Coordinates: 37.6484°N 120.9189°W

Information
- School type: Public
- Opened: 1992
- School district: Modesto City Schools
- Principal: Anthony Ball JR
- Teaching staff: 87.12 (FTE)
- Grades: 9-12
- Enrollment: 2,000 (2023–2024)
- Student to teacher ratio: 22.96
- Colors: Purple, black, and white
- Athletics: Marching Band, Winter Drumline, Color Guard, Cheer Leading, Football, Volleyball, Golf, Cross Country, Soccer, Water Polo, Tennis, Basketball, Wrestling, Baseball, Softball, Track, Swimming
- Mascot: Viking
- Website: johansen.monet.k12.ca.us

Peter Johansen High School is public school located in the eastern portion of Modesto, CA. It is part of Modesto City Schools and serves students in grades 9-12.

The school is a two-story structure with brick exterior. It features an Olympic-sized pool, two baseball fields, a softball and soccer field, three indoor full-size basketball courts, tennis courts, and a football stadium across the street from the campus. The enclosed campus has two bridges crossing the middle and southern portions of the school. The majority of the classrooms are located in three buildings; others are located in portables located in the southwest corner of the campus. The school colors evolved from purple/turquoise/white to the present purple/black during the late 1990s.

The school opened in the fall of 1992 to only freshmen, sophomores, and juniors. The first graduating class received their diplomas in the spring of 1994; with the gradual enlargement of the student body, 1996 was the first four-year graduating class.

The school was recognized for its building design excellence with the 1993 D. MacConnell Award from the Council of Educational Facilities Planners International and attracted a visit from the school trustees of West Sacramento's Washington Union School District who were looking to duplicate the successful campus construction.

== Alumni ==
- Marcella Arguello, comedian.
- Morgan James, a singer, songwriter, and actress
- Heath Pearce, professional soccer player for the New York Red Bulls in Major League Soccer
- Mike Thiessen, football coach.
