= Michelle Mello =

American empirical health law scholar

- Born: California, U.S.

Academic background
- Education: Stanford University (BA); University of Oxford (MPhil); University of North Carolina at Chapel Hill (PhD); Yale Law School (JD)
- Thesis: Market penetration, biased selection, and utilization in Medicare HMOs (1999)

Academic work
- Institutions: Harvard University; Stanford University

Michelle Marie Mello is an American empirical health law scholar. She is Professor of Law at Stanford Law School and Professor of Health Policy in the Department of Health Policy at Stanford University School of Medicine. She is also a faculty affiliate at the Stanford Institute for Human-Centered Artificial Intelligence.

== Early life and education ==
Mello was born and raised in California to parents David and Susan alongside two brothers. She attended Fred C. Beyer High School. In 1989, Mello enrolled at Stanford University. At Stanford, she double-majored in political science and an individually designed major, applied ethics, and was part of the Ethics in Society honors program. Following her graduation in 1993, she received a Marshall scholarship to spend two years at the University of Oxford for her Master's degree in Comparative Social Research. She then pursued a PhD in Health Policy at the University of North Carolina at Chapel Hill, with a dissertation focused on enrollee selection dynamics and health care utilization in Medicare HMOs. While completing her dissertation, she also completed a JD at Yale Law School.

== Career ==
In 2000, Mello became an assistant professor at the Harvard T.H. Chan School of Public Health where she taught health policy and law. Early into her time at Harvard, Mello was selected for The Greenwall Foundation Faculty Scholars Program, in which she pursued research on "Ethical Issues in the Pharmaceutical Industry." Mello was also the recipient of a Robert Wood Johnson Foundation Investigator Award in Health Policy Research to study disclosure and compensation of medical injuries. Later, Mello led two large-scale projects evaluating 5 New York City hospitals' implementation of the communication-and-resolution program (CRP) in general surgery. The purpose of CRP was to investigate how hospitals and liability insurers could improve their responses to unanticipated care outcomes for patients and families. Mello became a tenured full professor at Harvard in 2008. In 2013, she was elected a member of the Institute of Medicine for her impact in the field of public health.

In 2014, Mello left Harvard to become a professor of law at the Stanford Law School with a joint appointment as a professor in the Stanford School of Medicine. In 2022, Mello was awarded the John A. Benson Jr., MD Professionalism Article Prize by the American Board of Internal Medicine Foundation for her article, "When Physicians Engage in Practices That Threaten the Nation’s Health." She has served on a number of committees of the National Academies of Sciences, Engineering, and Medicine, including a committee studying the potential value of wastewater surveillance in the prevention and control of infectious diseases. She teaches courses in Torts and Health Law.

In 2024, Mello co-founded the Healthcare Ethical Assessment Lab for Artificial Intelligence (HEAL-AI Lab) at Stanford, which conducts ethical reviews of healthcare AI tools. More broadly, her current work spans legal and ethical issues arising from use of AI tools in clinical and insurance settings; affordability of and access to biopharmaceuticals; and uses of law to improve public health.

== Personal life ==
Mello is married and has two sons.
