= Xclamation Festival =

Annual festival held in Modesto, California

The Xclamation Festival or X Fest is an annual festival that takes place on the streets of downtown Modesto, California from 9th to 12th between J and H Streets, usually on the first Saturday in August. Begun in 2000 and organized by Chris Ricci Presents, the day is characterized by a Mardi Gras atmosphere, concert performances that go into the late evening hours, and a motto of "Good Times, Downtown." The festival features 50 bands on 8 stages over the course of 8 hours.

"(X Fest) is a little bit rock, a little bit hip hop, a little bit funk and all Modesto." Recent headlining bands include: Simple Plan, Mix Master Mike, Blue October, DJ Dan, Pepper, Bad Boy Bill, Candlebox, Blake Lewis, Debbie Deb, The Expendables, N2Deep, Eve 6, Mother Hips, Digital Underground, Y&T, Joe Diffie, Pepper, Vanilla Ice, the Marshall Tucker Band, Foghat, and the Michael Schenker Group. Performers from previous years include Grandaddy, Tone Loc, Berlin, Young MC, Pat Travers, Fastball, The Busboys, Dazz Band, Rose Royce, Powerman 5000, Sir Mix A Lot, Blessid Union of Souls, DAM, and Montrose.

The festival is 21 and over only, and has boasted crowds that average 15,000 people, which is the capacity limit set by the City of Modesto. The festival has been a source of controversy at times throughout its existence, with some city council members who said they supported downtown music but feared drinking at X-Fest was not worth the risk it presents to the city.
