= Veva Porter =

American printmaker and arts educator

Veva Gertrude Porter
- Born: August 11, 1910
- Died: January 24, 2008 (aged 97)
- Known for: Printmaking, education
- Notable work: Iberia, Coup D’Essai, Recuerdo

Veva Porter (1910–2008) was an American modernist printmaker and arts educator based in Modesto, California. She is known for her vibrant color serigraphs and contributions to regional arts education in California's Central Valley. Her work was featured in exhibitions throughout the state, including shows alongside noted artists such as Wayne Thiebaud.

== Early life and education ==
Porter was born on August 11, 1910, in Tulare, California, to Myrtle Daisy Walton and Charles Brown Porter. Raised in Visalia, California, she graduated from local schools before enrolling at the California School of Arts and Crafts (now California College of the Arts) in Oakland, where she studied printmaking. In 1937, she married architect John William Bomberger; though occasionally exhibiting under her married name, she continued to professionally use Veva Porter. In addition to her studio practice, she worked as a stylist-designer for the California Cotton Mills in Oakland and taught printmaking in Modesto.

== Career ==
Porter specialized in screenprinting (serigraphy), a printmaking technique that gained wide popularity in the United States in the mid‑twentieth century. Her compositions featured modernist abstraction and layered color fields, with poetic titles such as Iberia (1949), Coup D’Essai (1952), and Recuerdo (1954).

In 1952, Porter's print Coup D’Essai was awarded the Art Division Sweepstakes Prize at the Stanislaus County Fair. That same year, her work appeared in exhibitions at the Modesto Public Library and the Women's Club of Visalia.

Porter's work was also shown at the California State Fair in Sacramento and in exhibits sponsored by the Lodi Art League. In 1956, she was included in the Modesto Art Association Fall Exhibit alongside Wayne Thiebaud.

In 1955, Porter's serigraphs—including *Façade*, *Prelude*, and *Vignette*—were shown in a historical survey of graphic arts by the Achenbach Foundation at the California Palace of the Legion of Honor.

Porter achieved national acclaim for *Coup D’Essai*, which won the M. Grumbacher Graphic Art Purchase Prize at the International Art Premiere hosted by Florida Southern College, Lakeland, Florida, in 1952. The same work earned second prize at the 9th Annual National Art Exhibit at Huckleberry Mountain, Hendersonville, North Carolina, and honorable mention in the 4th Annual Graphic and Decorative Arts Exhibit sponsored by Northern California Arts. She was invited into the National Serigraph Society and exhibited in its traveling circuit across galleries in New York City, San Francisco, Seattle, and Pebble Beach.

== Veva Porter Art Studio ==
Porter founded the Veva Porter Art Studio in Modesto, offering instruction and scholarships to young artists in Stanislaus County. The studio supported arts programming throughout the 1950s and 1960s, including youth exhibitions and community workshops.

== Legacy ==
Several of Porter's works are held by prominent institutions. The National Gallery of Art, Washington, D.C., includes her serigraph *Iberia* (1949) in its collection. The Fine Arts Museums of San Francisco (Legion of Honor) also hold her prints *Recuerdo* (1954), *Prelude* (1955), and *Paper Doves* (1981) in their permanent collection.

Porter is remembered as a notable figure among mid-20th-century California printmakers and women artists. Her technical skill and educational leadership—particularly through her printmaking instruction in Modesto—merit renewed scholarly attention.

== Selected works ==
- Iberia (1949)
- Coup D’Essai (1952)
- Recuerdo (1954)
- Les Jeux (1956)
- Solstice (1967)

== Selected exhibitions ==
- 1952 – California Palace of the Legion of Honor, San Francisco, CA. Included three serigraphs exhibited as part of a national survey of graphic arts.
- 1954 – Northern California Arts Exhibition, CA. Received honorable mention for the serigraph "Façades."
- 1955 – City of Paris Summer Exhibition, San Francisco, CA. Included serigraphs, lithographs, and monotypes by Western and French artists.
- 1955 – Florida Southern College, Lakeland, FL. Winner of the M. Grumbacher Graphic Art Purchase Prize at the International Art Premiere for "Coup D’Essai." Work acquired into the college's permanent collection.
- 1955 – Huckleberry Mountain Ninth Annual National Art Exhibit, Hendersonville, NC. Awarded second prize in graphics for “Coup D’Essai.”
- 1955–56 – Exhibitions held by the National Serigraph Society, New York, NY. “Coup D’Essai” exhibited in the society's monthly circuit and Veva Porter was invited to join the organization.
- 1950s–60s – Numerous additional exhibitions in Pebble Beach, Seattle, and New York City.

== See also ==
- Serigraphy
