= Hotel Covell =

Hotel in Modesto, California, US

- U.S. National Register of Historic Places
- Location within California
- Location: 1023 J St., Modesto, California
- Coordinates: 37°38′28″N 120°59′58″W
- Area: less than one acre
- Built: 1924
- Architect: Cornelius, A.W.
- Architectural style: Beaux Arts, Renaissance
- NRHP reference No.: 94001501
- Added to NRHP: December 29, 1994

Hotel Covell was a historic hotel in downtown Modesto, California. The first construction of the building was completed in 1924. A second addition was completed in 1928. The hotel operated from its inception in 1924 until closing in the 1980s. With the second addition to the building, the total number of hotel rooms was brought to 120. It was acclaimed as "one of the finest hotels of its day" and played an integral role in the economic development in the city.

It was about 142 by 175 feet (43 m × 53 m) in plan and included 120 hotel guest rooms, after the 1928 expansion. It included a 700-seat Art Moderne theatre, with a barrel vault roof, which was renovated in 1949.

The hotel was demolished by 2006 after it was deemed as not being earthquake safe. A new development titled Tenth Street Place now sits where the Hotel Covell previously did.
