= Grace M. Davis High School =

Coordinates: 37°40′52.74″N 0121°0′36.77″W

Location
- 1200 W. Rumble Road; Modesto, California 95350; United States

Information
- Established: 1961
- School district: Modesto City Schools
- Principal: Michael Shroyer
- Teaching staff: 90.36 (FTE)
- Grades: 9-12
- Enrollment: 2,022 (2023–2024)
- Student to teacher ratio: 22.38
- Colors: Green and Gold
- Athletics: CIF Sac-Joaquin Section
- Athletics conference: Western Athletic Conference
- Mascot: Spartan
- Newspaper: Corinthian
- Yearbook: Olympian
- Website: davis.mcs4kids.com

Grace M. Davis High School, commonly referred to as Davis High School, is a public high school located in Modesto, California, United States. Established in 1961, the school serves students in grades 9-12. Davis High was recognized as a California Distinguished School in 2005.

== History ==
Davis High School was established in what was then a rural setting and was intended to serve approximately 1,800 students from predominantly agricultural-based families in north Modesto and Salida. As Modesto and Salida have grown, so has Davis High School. Davis later served more than 2800 students.

However, after the opening of Joseph Gregori High School in Modesto, CA, Davis High School's student population again dropped below 2000 as a large portion of the student body enrolled at Gregori for the start of the 2010-2011 school year.

== Campus ==
The campus consists of three locker rows, an activity court or quad area used mainly for lunch consumption and student body activities, and approximately 100 classrooms. The campus is bordered, on the North Side, by Rumble Road, and on the West side by Tully Road. The South side of the campus is bordered by the Davis football field, tracks, and soccer fields. To the East, adjacent to the campus, is Davis Park, a recreational area. There is also a picnic area that used to have awnings covering the benches. After Davis became a closed campus, students continued to frequent the park during school hours, subjecting them to consequences for being out of bounds per board policy.

== Curriculum ==
The school participates in the California Partnership Academies program, which provides school-within-a-school opportunities for students interested in pursuing careers in health sciences and public safety:

The Health Careers Academy, exclusive to the Grace Davis campus, is a four-year "school-within-a-school" program filled with college preparatory classes.

AVID stands for Advancement Via Individual Determination. This program helps students get into a four-year college after they graduate from high school.

The Davis High School Public Safety Academy is a three-year "school within a school" program, with a recommended freshman pre-academy year, which offers a college preparatory academic curriculum as well as vocational experiences for students interested in careers in criminal justice and public safety.

This program provides a thematic approach for core courses in the field of public safety and career exploration. The sophomore year introduces the academy concepts in English, science, world history, and Public Safety Tech I classes. In the junior and senior years, students will continue to explore careers in public safety through their government, English, advanced math, and science classes, in addition to taking a CERT/First Responder course. Upon completion of the CERT/First Responder course, students are eligible to be members of the on-campus emergency preparedness and response team.

Additionally, Davis offers a four-year Middle College program. The program is designed to allow students to take college classes on their regular school day. Students complete online classes during the regular school day and have the opportunity to earn college credits.

== Athletics ==
Grace M. Davis High School belongs to the Western Athletic Conference in the Sac-Joaquin Section of the California Interscholastic Federation. Before the conference's creation in 2004, the school belonged to the Central California Conference. The teams, known as the Spartans, compete in baseball, basketball, cross country, football, golf, soccer, softball, swimming, tennis, track, volleyball, water polo, and wrestling.

== Notable alumni ==
- Al Autry - pitched one game for the Atlanta Braves
- Lincoln Brewster (1989) - Christian recording artist
- Meghan Camarena (2005) – YouTube personality, The Amazing Race contestant, and television host
- Lee Herrick - California Poet Laureate
- Ray Lankford - Major League Baseball player, primarily for the St. Louis Cardinals
- Chandra Levy (1995) - an intern in Washington, D.C., who disappeared in the spring of 2001 and is presumed murdered
- James Marsters (1980) - film and television actor
- Michael McDonald (2009) - professional Mixed Martial Artist formerly with the UFC, current Bellator MMA Bantamweight
- Tisha Venturini - soccer player on the US women's team in the 1996 Olympics
- Ashley Walker - was the star player on the UC Berkeley women's basketball team from 2005-2009 and played for WNBA team Seattle Storm.
- Kerry McCoy - guitarist for blackgaze band, Deafheaven
- George Clarke - singer for blackgaze band, Deafheaven
