= McHenry Mansion =

Historic house in California, United States

Coordinates: 37.643533°N 120.994450°W

- The McHenry Mansion as it appeared in June 2010.
- Interactive map of McHenry Mansion
- Location: 906 15th St. Modesto, California, U.S.

History
- Built: 1883
- Built for: Robert McHenry

Site notes
- Architect: Jeremiah Robinson
- Architectural styles: Victorian and Italianate
- Restored: 1977–1983 (first restoration); 2011–2013 (second restoration)
- Restored by: City of Modesto

U.S. National Register of Historic Places
- Designated: 1978
- Reference no.: 78000805

The McHenry Mansion is a Victorian-Italianate historic house museum situated in the historic downtown of Modesto, California. It was originally built in 1883 as a residence for Robert McHenry, a prominent local resident.

== History ==
In 1880, Robert McHenry, a local rancher and banker, purchased five lots on the corner of 15th and I streets in Modesto for what would become the McHenry Mansion. McHenry hired Jeremiah Robinson, a Stockton contractor, to design and construct the mansion. Construction began in 1882 and was completed in 1883. The mansion was constructed in the High Victorian Italianate style that was popular at the time.

After construction, Robert McHenry lived in the mansion with his wife Matilda until his death in 1890. With the death of Matilda in 1896, their son Oramil McHenry moved into the mansion with his wife Louise and their three children. Oramil and Louise divorced in 1901 and Oramil married Myrtie Conneau in 1902. Myrtie inherited the McHenry Mansion following Oramil's death in 1906 from stomach cancer. The mansion changed ownership again when Myrtie remarried, to William Langdon, in 1908. In total, the McHenry mansion was continuously occupied by members of the McHenry family for 36 years, spanning three generations from 1883 to 1919.

Subsequently, the mansion became the Elmwood Sanitarium in 1919, then the Langdon Apartments in 1923. It continued to be used as an apartment building until 1976, when it came on the market. At the time, Modesto was rapidly losing much of its historical architecture, so Aileen and Julio Gallo purchased the McHenry Mansion through the Julio R. Gallo Foundation to preserve it. The mansion was restored and opened to the public in 1983 and has since been open as a historical landmark with available tours. In 2011 the front of the mansion was damaged in a major fire and has since been restored to its original state. It has been alleged that hauntings and strange occurrences have occurred at the site.

== Bibliography ==
- Stanley Bare, Colleen (1985). The McHenry Mansion: Modesto's Heritage. McHenry Mansion Foundation Press. ISBN 978-0-9615926-1-5.
