= Joseph Gregori High School =

Joseph A. Gregori High School

Location
- 3701 Pirrone Road; Modesto, California 95356; United States; 37°43′13″N 121°03′50″W

Information
- School type: Public
- Established: 2010
- Status: Open
- School district: Modesto City Schools
- Principal: Phillip Jaramillo
- Teaching staff: 98.74 (on an FTE basis)
- Grades: 9–12
- Enrollment: 2,414 (2023–2024)
- Student to teacher ratio: 24.45
- Campus size: 88 acres (36 ha)
- Campus type: Rural
- Colors: Navy blue and Gold
- Athletics: CIF Sac-Joaquin Section
- Athletics conference: Central California Athletic League
- Mascot: Jaguar
- Newspaper: Jag News Net Student Media
- Website: Joseph Gregori High School

Joseph A. Gregori High School is a high school in Modesto, California, United States. When it opened in fall 2010, it was the seventh comprehensive high school in Modesto City Schools.

== History ==
Planning for this school started in the early 1990s, following a lengthy history within the district of the need for another campus to accommodate students in the Salida area and northwest Modesto, relieving overcrowding at Modesto and Davis High School. In 2001, Modesto City Schools passed a high school bond called Measure T that provided $65 million for the construction of two high schools.

The school is named for Joseph Gregori, who served as a principal, teacher, and coach in the Modesto City Schools for 28 years before his death in 1998 at age 50.

The school opened in the fall of 2010 with 9th and 10th-grade students. It was designed for a capacity of 2,500 students and was projected to open with 1,800–1,950 students.
