= Modesto International Architecture Festival =

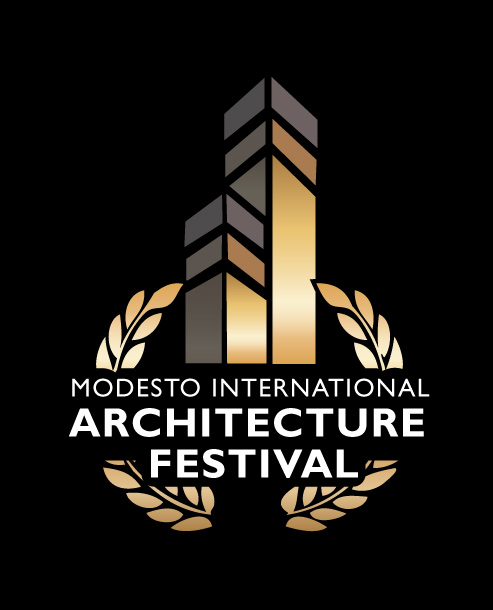
Architecture Festival Logo

The Modesto International Architecture Festival was an architecture festival.

== History ==
In 2008, the American Institute of Architects Sierra Valley Chapter (AIASV) founded the “AIA Sierra Valley Film Festival” in collaboration with the Modesto Art Museum, the State Theatre, and the Modesto Film Society. Bob Barzan, executive director of the Modesto Art Museum, approached the Modesto Film Society, State Theatre and David Burkett with AIA Sierra Valley to see if they were interested in partnering with the museum for an architectural film event. The four organizations got together and planned the first event. The festival became an ongoing event featuring 4 architectural film nights throughout the year. From 2008 to 2018, the festival grew to incorporate new events, incorporating lectures, exhibits, tours and special events.

In 2010, the festival received its new name "The Modesto International Architecture Festival". The festival was open to submissions by independent film makers from around the world.

== Past films ==
2008

- The Fountainhead
- Metropolis
- Sketches of Frank Gehry
- Greening of Southie

2009

- Maya Lin: A Strong Clear Vision
- Architect of Dreams (AUDIENCE FAVORITE AWARD WINNER)
- Angle of Inspiration

2010

- Aqua Tower
- Rick Joy: Interludes (AUDIENCE FAVORITE AWARD WINNER)
- A Girl is a Fellow Here
- Columbus, Indiana: Unexpected, Unforgettable
- Jonathan Segal: Design + Build + Sustain
- Sprawlanta
- Building Imagination: Wealth
- Make No Little Plans: Daniel Burnham and the American City
- Visual Acoustics: The Modernism of Julius Shulman

2011

- Peter Stutchbury, Architecture of Place
- Subversive Architects
- A Plea for Modernism
- So What
- Morris Lapidus: Architect | Icon | American Original
- Portland: A Sense of Place (AUDIENCE FAVORITE AWARD WINNER)

2012

- Daeyang Gallery and House: A Conversation with Steven Holl (AUDIENCE FAVORITE AWARD WINNER)
- Alone and Desired
- Village Architect
- Daniel Libeskind : Artist Series
- Second Nature : A Documentary Film About Janne Saario
- Hedonistic Sustainability
