= KMRQ =

Radio station in Riverbank–Modesto, California

- Riverbank, California; United States
- Broadcast area: Modesto, California
- Frequency: 96.7 MHz (HD Radio)
- Branding: Rock 96.7

Programming
- Format: Active rock
- Subchannels: HD2: KFIV Simulcast
- Affiliations: Compass Media Networks; Premiere Networks

Ownership
- Owner: iHeartMedia, Inc.; (iHM Licenses, LLC)
- Sister stations: KFIV, KJSN, KOSO, KWSX

History
- First air date: 1979
- Former call signs: KQKK (1979–1984); KORY (1984); KROI (1984); KSJQ (1984–1989); KIZS (1989); KVFX (1989–1997); KFRY (1997–1999); KKME (1999–2001)

Technical information
- Licensing authority: FCC
- Facility ID: 12963
- Class: A
- ERP: 6,000 watts
- HAAT: 91 meters (299 ft)
- Transmitter coordinates: 37°40′49.8″N 120°55′25.5″W

Links
- Public license information: Public file; LMS
- Webcast: Listen live (via iHeartRadio); Listen live (HD2); }}
- Website: rock967.iheart.com

KMRQ (96.7 FM) is a radio station broadcasting an active rock format. Licensed to Riverbank, California, United States, the station serves the Modesto area. The station is currently owned by iHeartMedia, Inc. with studios and transmitter located separately in Modesto, with its studios on Lancey Drive and its transmitter on Hawaiian Petrel Avenue.

== History ==
The station went on the air as KQKK in 1979. Then had several callsign changes over the years KVFX 96.7 The Fox, then finally set on the KMRQ calls. The station had spent the previous 2 ½ years as a Spanish language station branded as "La Preciosa" until the switch to Active Rock on 2008-09-05.
