= KOSO =

Rado station in Patterson–Modesto, California

- Patterson, California; United States
- Broadcast area: Modesto metropolitan area
- Frequency: 92.9 MHz (HD Radio)
- Branding: 92.9 The Big Dog

Programming
- Format: Country
- Affiliations: Premiere Networks

Ownership
- Owner: iHeartMedia, Inc.; (iHM Licenses, LLC)
- Sister stations: KFIV, KJSN, KMRQ, KQOD, KWSX

History
- First air date: June 8, 1966
- Former call signs: KHOM (1961–1966)
- Former frequencies: 93.1 MHz (1962–2009)
- Call sign meaning: Mount Oso

Technical information
- Licensing authority: FCC
- Facility ID: 35426
- Class: A
- ERP: 6,000 watts
- HAAT: 100 meters (330 ft)
- Transmitter coordinates: 37°36′24.20″N 121°2′37.20″W

Links
- Public license information: Public file; LMS
- Webcast: Listen live (via iHeartRadio)
- Website: 929thebigdog.iheart.com

KOSO (92.9 FM, "The Big Dog") is a commercial radio station licensed to Patterson, California, United States, and serving the Modesto metropolitan area. Owned by iHeartMedia, the station carries a country format with studios on Lancey Drive in Modesto and transmitter sited off West Hatch Road in Riverdale Park, California, near the Tuolumne River. (The tower was originally near Mount Oso, from which it got its call sign.)

KOSO broadcasts in the HD Radio hybrid format.

== History ==
On June 8, 1966, KOSO signed on the air. It originally broadcast on 93.1 MHz and was powered at 1,100 watts. It was owned by the Sierra-Pacific Radio Corporation, with studios and offices in Modesto.

The station previously had an adult contemporary format and was branded as "KO93". The mainstream AC format continued until the summer of 1995, when the station was rebranded as "B93". As a result, the station shifted to a hot AC format.

In 1997, B93 began to transition towards a modern AC format, adding more alternative rock-leaning artists such as Alanis Morissette, Counting Crows, Gin Blossoms, and The Cranberries to its playlist.

In 2000, Clear Channel Communications, the forerunner to today's iHeartMedia, acquired KOSO. Clear Channel needed the station to bring a "move-in station" to the Sacramento radio market.

On June 1, 2009, at midnight, KOSO moved from 93.1 MHz to 92.9 MHz as a result of the start of 93.1 FM KHJQ Pollock Pines, near Sacramento, which began broadcasting in June 2009. That station today is KFBK-FM, co-owned with KOSO.

On October 2, 2012, KOSO shifted its format to hot AC, branded as "Radio 92.9". On March 2, 2015, KOSO returned to its "B93" branding.

On July 1, 2016, at 12 noon, KOSO changed its format from hot AC to country music, branded as "92.9 The Big Dog".
