= Gallo Center for the Arts =

Performing arts center in Modesto, California

Coordinates: 37.639444°N 120.998333°W

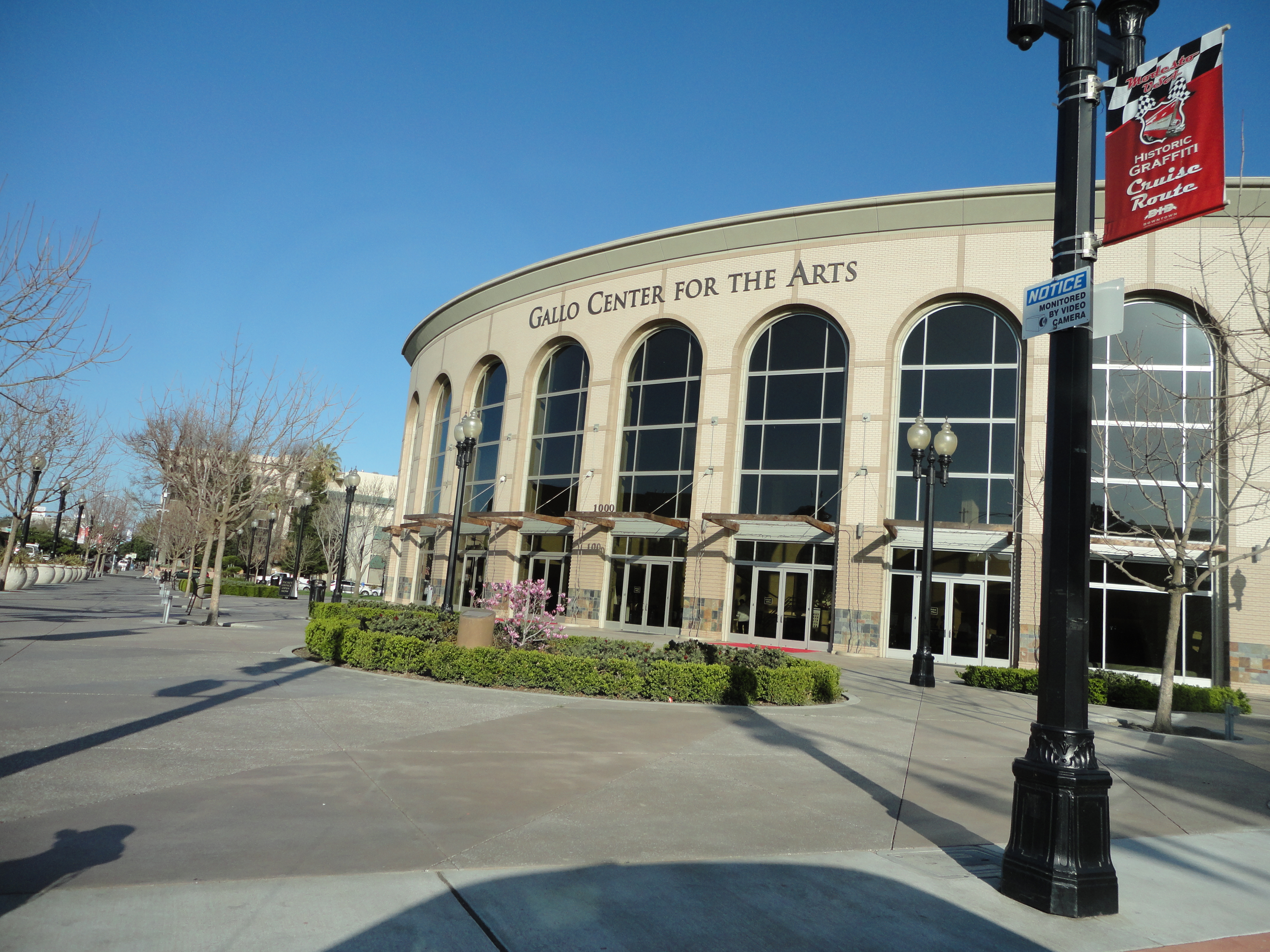
- Exterior of the arts center (c.2012)
- Former names: Central Valley Center for the Arts (planning); Gallo Performing Arts Center (planning)
- Location: 1000 I St; Modesto, CA 95354-2381
- Owner: Stanislaus County
- Operator: Gallo Center for the Arts, Inc.
- Capacity: 1,248 (Mary Stuart Rogers Theater); 440 (Foster Family Theater)

Construction
- Groundbreaking: April 27, 2004
- Opened: September 27, 2007
- Cost: $47 million
- Architects: Carrier Johnson; John Sergio Fisher & Associates; Nestor & Gaffney Architecture
- Project managers: Knudson-Benson Associate; Mitze Productions
- Services engineer: 3QC
- General contractors: Clark & Sullivan
- Main contractor: RDC Project Development

Website
- Venue Website

The Gallo Center for the Arts is a performing arts center in Modesto, California.

The building was formally opened on September 27, 2007 (the project cost was $47,000,000) and features two theaters: the Mary Stuart Rogers Theater and the Foster Family Theater. The Gallo Center hosts six resident companies: Central West Ballet, the Modesto Community Concerts Association, the Modesto Symphony Orchestra, Modesto Performing Arts, Opera Modesto, and YES (Youth Entertainment Stage) Company. The center has been toured and visited by many stars and notable figures since its opening day, with Patti LuPone becoming the first star to perform in the Mary Stuart Rogers Theater. Touring Broadway shows have also performed at the center, from Evita and Cats to newer shows such as Shrek: The Musical.

When it was created, a permanent endowment fund was established (in the amount of $15,000,000) to ensure that the events and educational programs provided could be affordable to the residents of Stanislaus and allow for the improvement of the facility as needed.
