= Modesto, California =

- City
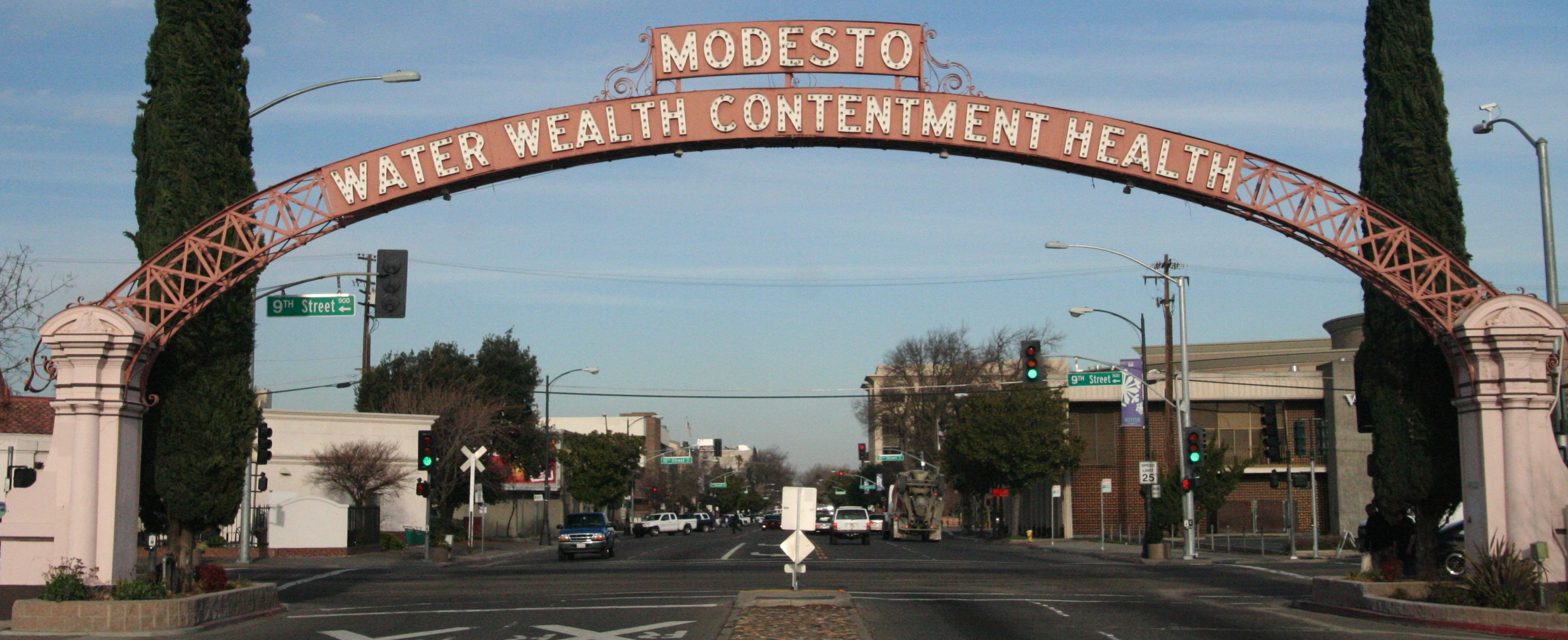
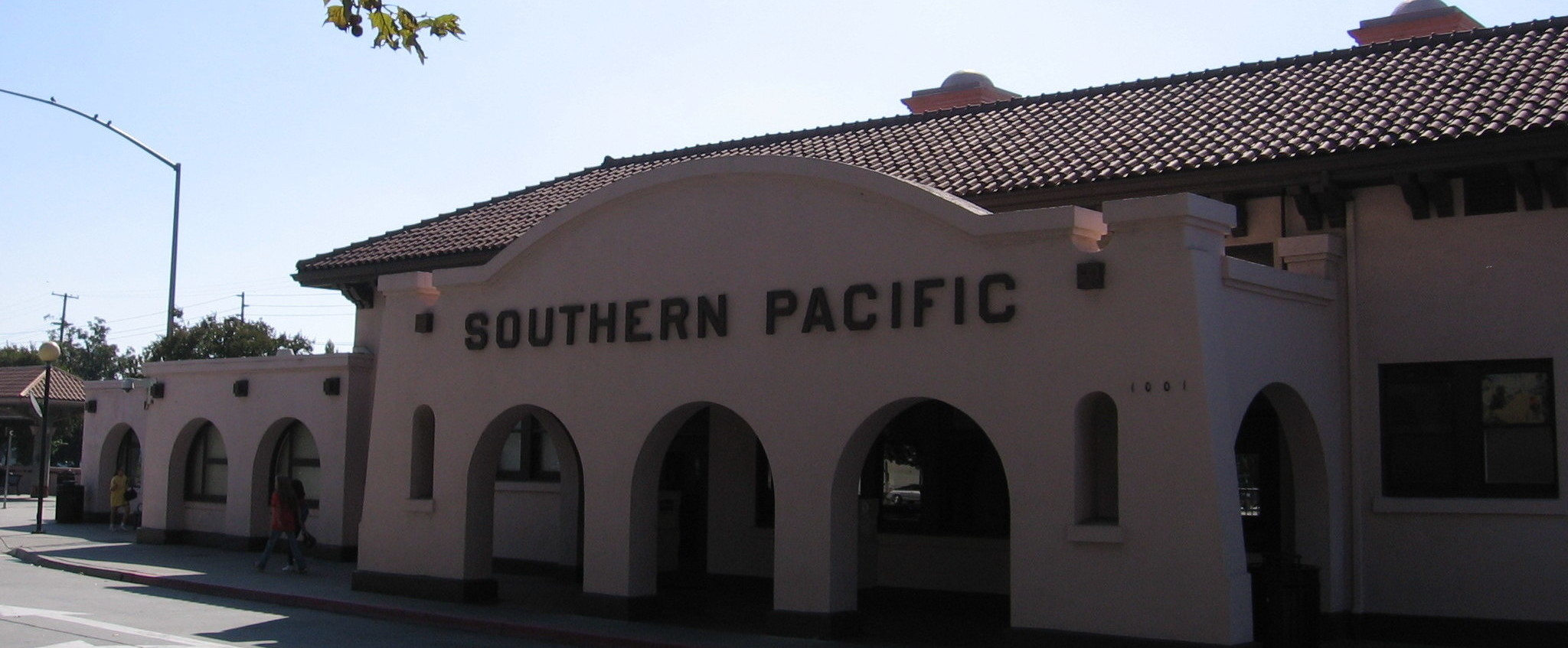
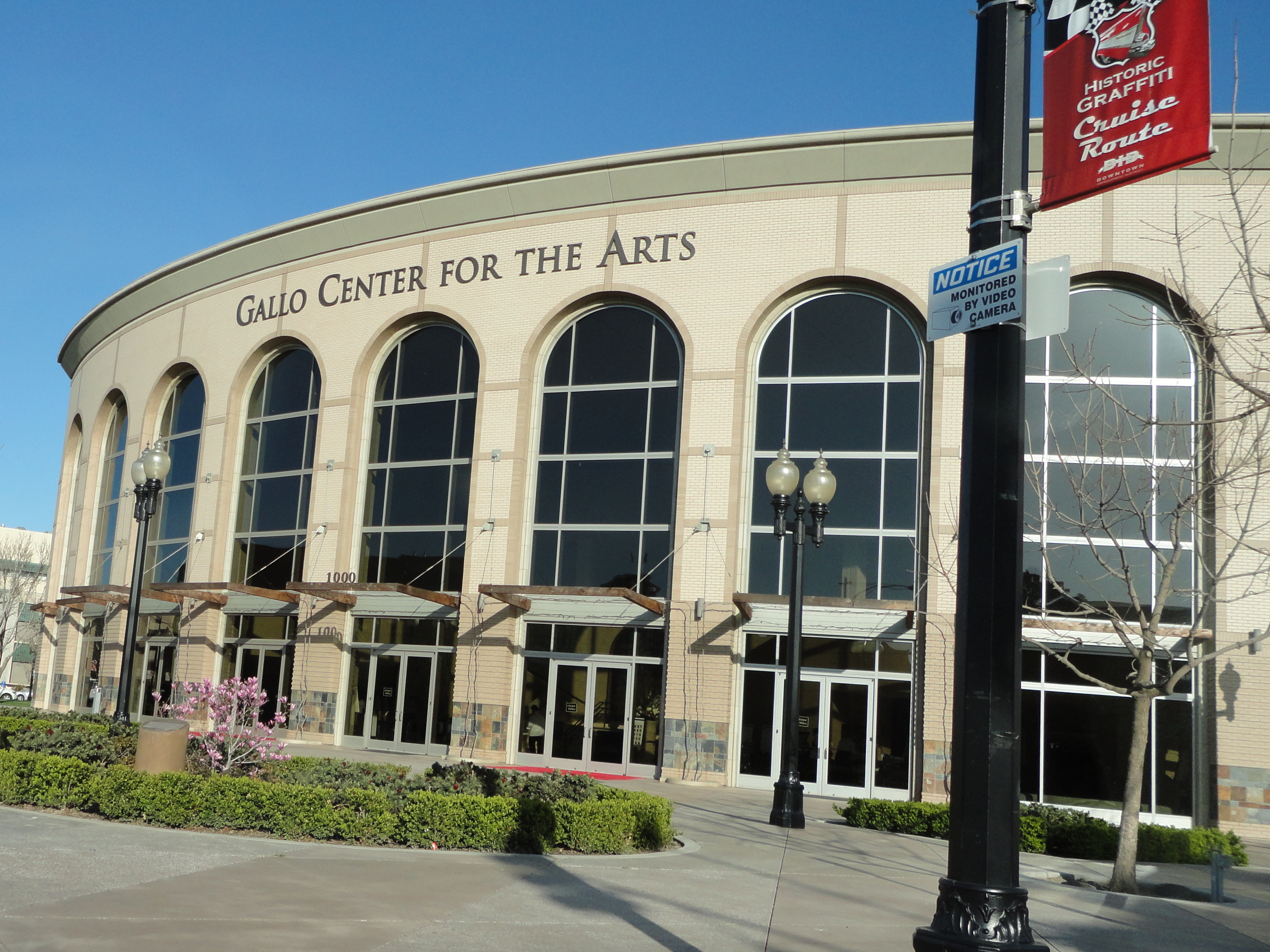
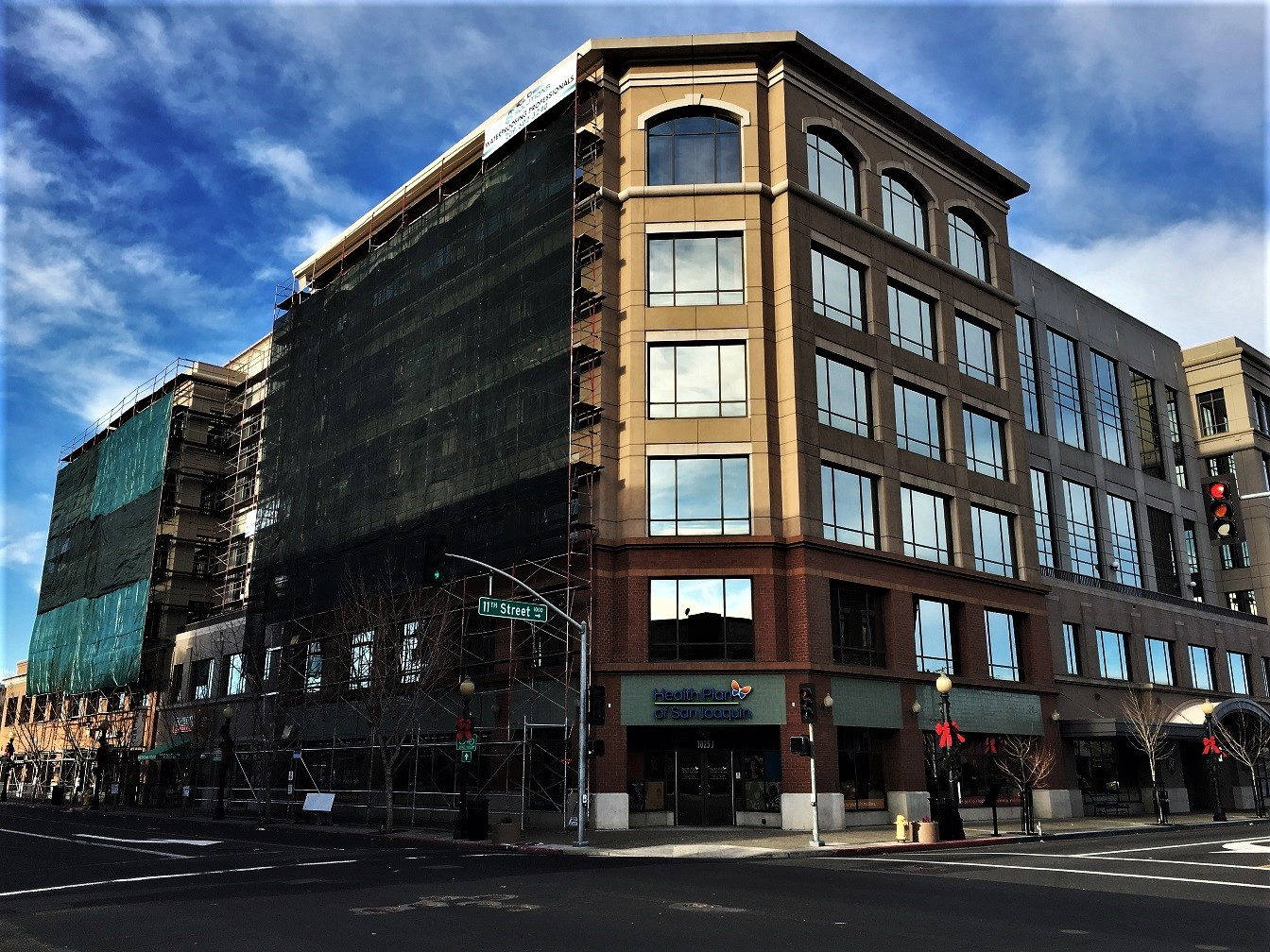
- Clockwise: Modesto Arch; Modesto Transportation Center; Tenth Street Place; Gallo Center for the Arts

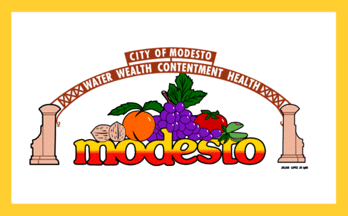
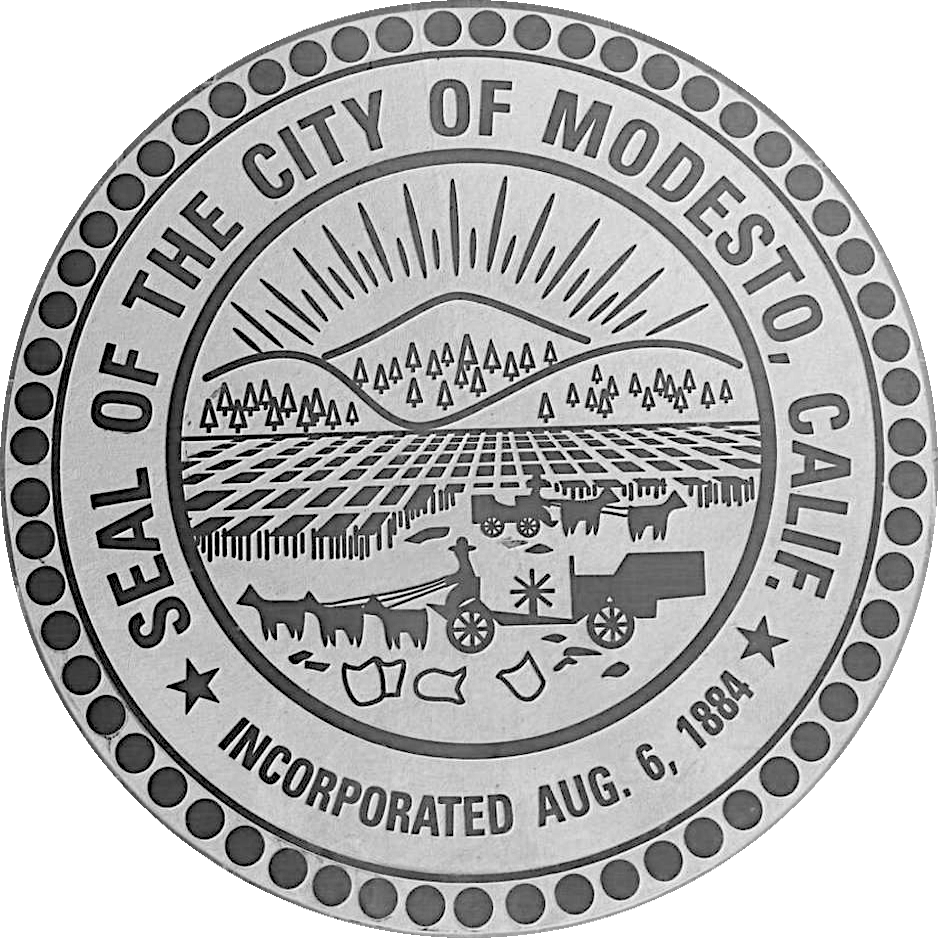
- Flag Seal Logo
- Nickname: City of Great Neighbors
- Motto: Water Wealth Contentment Health
- Interactive map of Modesto, California
- Location within California Location within the United States
- Coordinates: 37°39′41″N 120°59′40″W
- Country: United States
- State: California
- Region: San Joaquin Valley
- County: Stanislaus
- Founded: November 8, 1870
- Incorporated: August 6, 1884
- Named for: Modesty of William Chapman Ralston

Government
  - Type: Council-manager
  - Mayor: Sue Zwahlen
  - City manager: Joseph Lopez

Area
  - City: 44.80 sq mi (116.04 km^{2})
  - Land: 42.97 sq mi (111.30 km^{2})
  - Water: 1.83 sq mi (4.74 km^{2}) 0.61%
  - Metro: 1,515 sq mi (3,920 km^{2})
- Elevation: 89 ft (27 m)

Population (2020)
  - City: 218,464
  - Rank: 1st in Stanislaus County; 19th in California; 109th in the United States
  - Density: 5,007.6/sq mi (1,933.45/km^{2})
  - Urban: 357,301 (US: 116th)
  - Urban density: 5,077/sq mi (1,960.2/km^{2})
  - Metro: 552,878 (US: 105th)
  - Metro density: 364.9/sq mi (140.9/km^{2})
- Time zone: UTC−8 (Pacific)
  - Summer (DST): UTC−7 (PDT)
- ZIP codes: 95350–95358, 95397
- Area code: 209 , 350
- FIPS code: 06-48354
- GNIS IDs: 277609, 2411130
- Website: modestogov.com

Modesto (/məˈdɛstoʊ/ mə-DESS-toh; Spanish pronunciation: [moˈðesto]; Spanish for "modest") is the county seat of and the largest city in Stanislaus County, California, United States. With a population of 218,069 according to 2022 U.S. Census Bureau estimates, it is the 19th-most populous city in California.

Modesto is located in the Central Valley region, 68 miles (109 km) south of Sacramento and 90 miles (140 km) north of Fresno. Distances from other places include: 40 miles (64 km) north of Merced, California, 92 miles (148 km) east of San Francisco, 66 miles (106 km) west of Yosemite National Park, and 24 miles (39 km) south of Stockton.

The city, in the San Joaquin Valley, is surrounded by rich farmland. Stanislaus County ranks sixth among California counties in farm production. It is home to Gallo Family Winery, the largest family-owned winery in the United States.

Modesto has been often honored as a Tree City USA.

== History ==
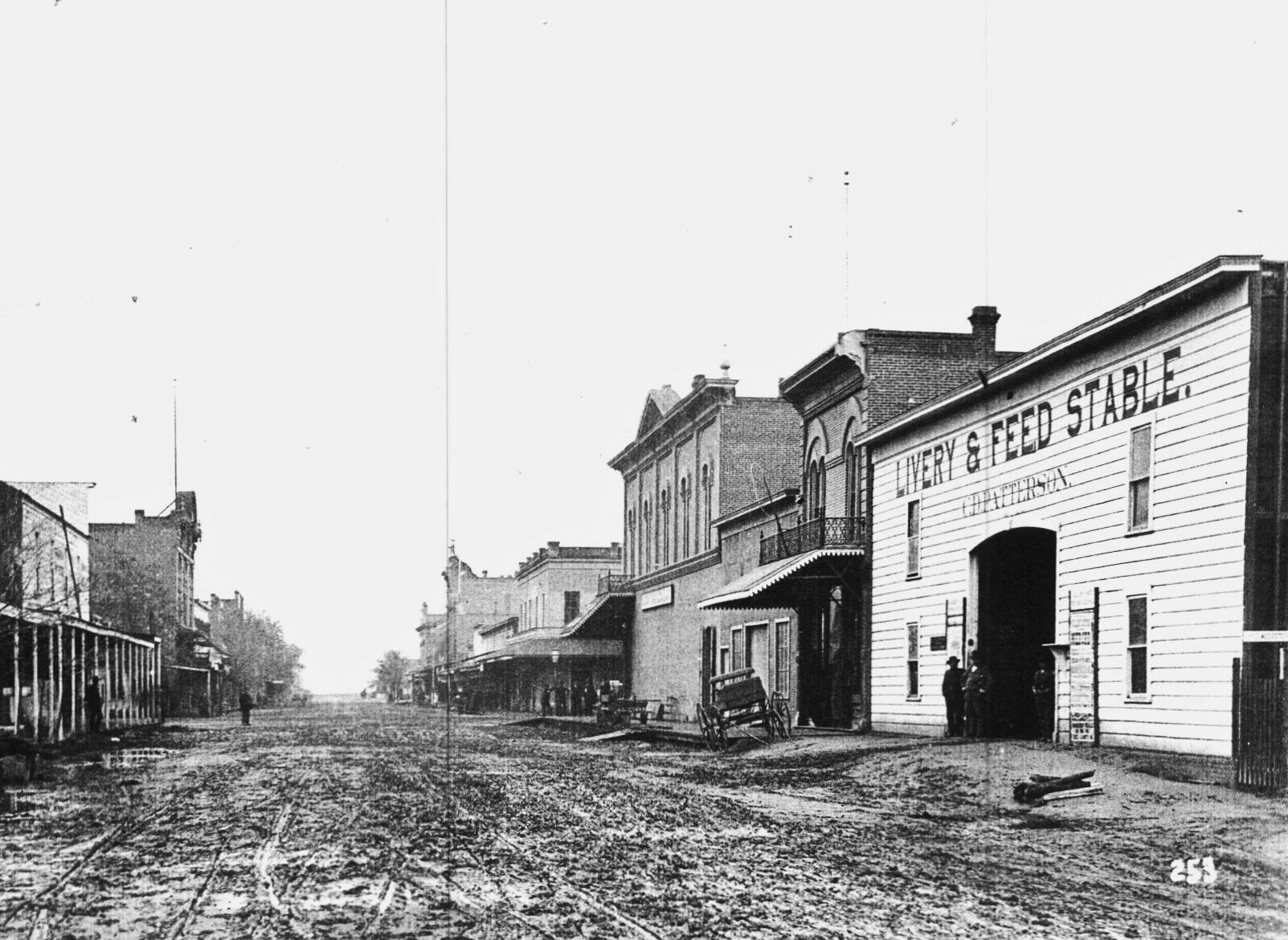
Modesto's 10th Street c. 1890

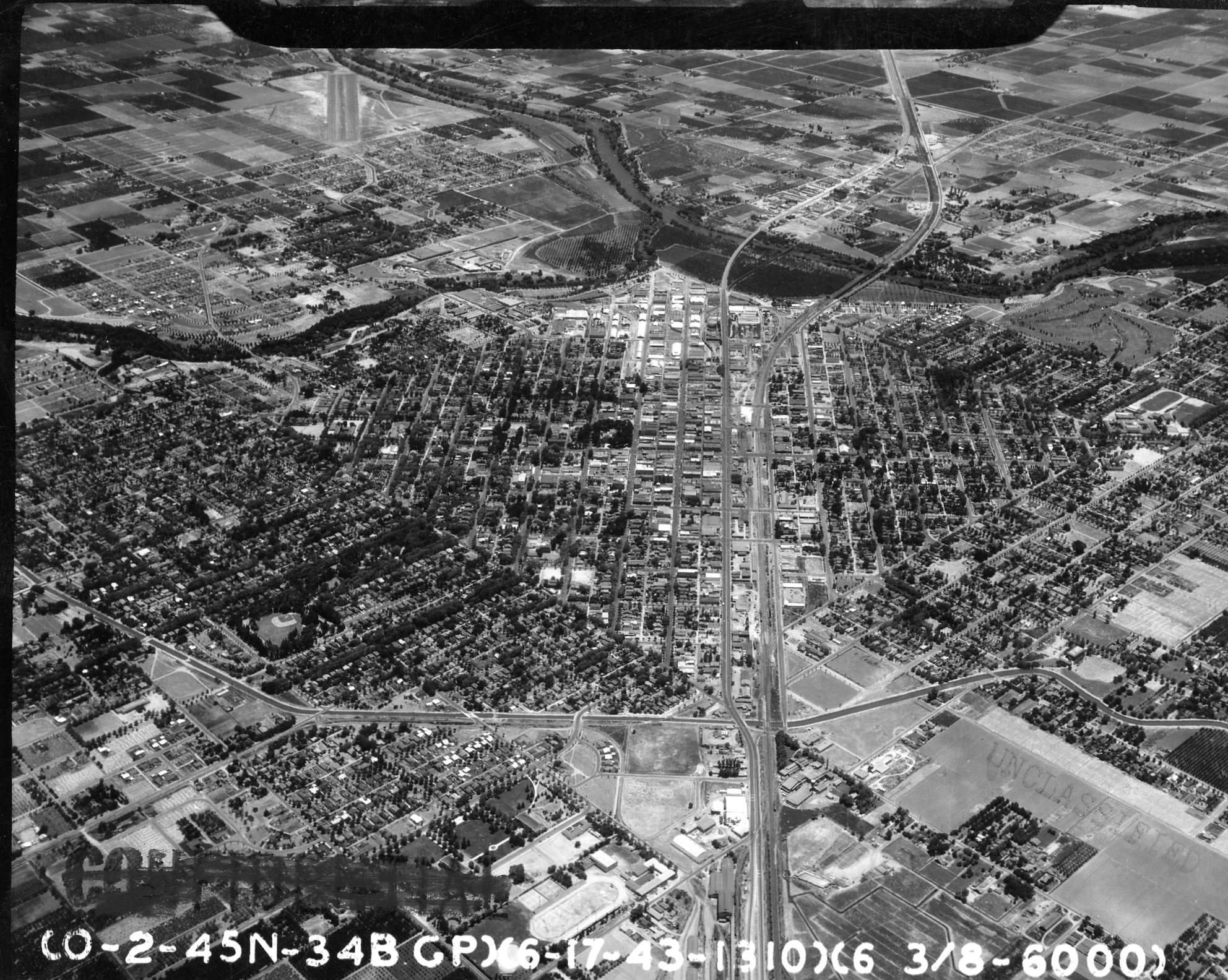
Modesto in 1943

The City of Modesto was originally a stop on the railroad connecting Sacramento to Los Angeles, built by Central Pacific Railroad. When Modesto was founded in 1870, the railroad company co-founder Mark Hopkins Jr. suggested to name it after his associate the banker William C. Ralston. Ralston asked that another name be found, and a railroad employee exclaimed loudly in Spanish that Ralston was a modest man. The railroad company co-founder Charles Crocker then named the town Modesto in recognition of Ralston's modesty.

Modesto's population exceeded 1,000 residents in 1884. With fields of grain, the nearby Tuolumne River for grain barges, and railroad traffic, the town grew. Irrigation water came from dams in the foothills, and irrigated fields of vegetables and fruit and nut trees flourished. By 1900, Modesto's population was more than 4,500. During World War II, the area provided canned goods, powdered milk, and eggs for the US armed forces and Allied forces. For the next few decades, Modesto's population grew about two percent per year, to over 100,000 in 1980 and over 200,000 in 2001.

The city's official motto, "Water Wealth Contentment Health," is emblazoned on the downtown Modesto Arch, which is featured in local photographs and postcards. The motto was selected in a contest held in 1911, with a $3 prize for the winner. (The original winning motto, "Nobody's got Modesto's goat", was later declined by town officials.) Modesto's motto is sometimes spoofed as "The land gets the water, the bankers get the wealth, the cows get contentment, and the farmers get the health."

=== Planning and environment ===
In 1885, Modesto enacted what is now considered to be the first zoning ordinance. The ordinance's primary goal was to keep laundries (which were primarily Chinese run), out of the city. After an arrested man filed to contest the constitutionality of the ordinance, the case escalated to the California Supreme Court which found the law to be constitutional.

In the late 1980s Modesto embarked on an update to the city's general plan pursuant to requirements of the State of California. The result was a comprehensive evaluation of alternative population and land use projections along with associated environmental impact analysis. Some of the environmental factors technically assessed were air quality, water quality, environmental noise, soil contamination and visual impacts.

Much of the soils in Modesto are classified as part of the Hanford series: (HbpA) fine sandy loam, moderately deep over silt. These soils are well-drained, moderately coarse-textured soils derived from alluvium from granitic rock. The Hanford soils are important for the production of a wide variety of irrigated orchard, field, and truck crops.

Vicinity watercourses include the Stanislaus River, the Tuolumne River, and the Dry Creek which empties into the Tuolumne River. Area groundwater, which is the principal source of water supply in the city, has been historically impaired in a fashion that is spatially variable. Water from the nearby Modesto Reservoir is now used to augment city water. In various parts of the city and its perimeter the following water pollutants have occurred from time to time: nitrates, dibromochloromethane, volatile organics, salinity, total dissolved solids and other pesticides. Each of these contaminants is not present citywide.

The EPA rates air quality in Modesto as a 23 on a scale to 100 (higher is better), making Modesto an unhealthy place to live for those with breathing difficulties. This is based on ozone alert days and number of pollutants in the air. In May 2010, Forbes magazine, in association with the American Lung Association, indicated that Modesto was one of the top 25 most polluted cities in the U.S.

=== Downtown revitalization ===
As of the 2000s, downtown Modesto (DOMO) has new attractions including the Gallo Center for the Arts and the new Downtown Plaza adjacent to Modesto Centre Plaza. Downtown Modesto has lost the Hotel Covell, the art deco Strand Theatre, and the Sears building.

Historic 10th and 11th streets, which were the original locations of the cruising featured in American Graffiti, have been designated by the City of Modesto as the Historic Cruise Route. This is now a tourist walk with information about Modesto's music, car and Graffiti culture.

In 2014, the Walk of Fame was launched on the Historic Cruise Route with markers celebrating classic legends like George Lucas, Gene Winfield, Bart Bartoni and others.

Classic Community Murals was launched by Modesto magazine ModestoView and the Peer Recovery Art Center to create a series of large scale murals celebrating the Modesto Classic Graffiti heritage. Many of these are on the Cruise Route.

New business incentives have been created to enhance facades, signage, and permitting. A promenade is being designed to create a special entertainment zone along the corridor between the Modesto Centre Plaza and the Gallo Center for the Arts and the adjacent core streets of 10th, 11th and J streets.

== Geography ==
Modesto is located in the center of the Central Valley surrounded by the Coastal Ranges and the Sierra Nevada, and close by, the numerous farmlands that produce a majority of several crops for the United States. There are also grassy and tree-filled preserves nearby. The city is in between the Tuolumne River and the nearby Stanislaus River. There is a small creek named Dry Creek, which is badly polluted by agricultural runoff and is adjacent to several parks. Rivers and lakes near Waterford are accessible for a kayak, or small motorboat, and there are several points of public access. This access was given as part of a government plan when hydroelectric power dams were installed upstream for flood control, irrigation, and electric power generation. The nearest large open seaport is the Port of Stockton, used for oceangoing ships that transport goods, particularly cement, fertilizer, and agricultural products, from California to overseas.

=== Climate ===
Modesto has a hot-summer Mediterranean climate (Csa) under the Köppen climate classification. It has cool to mild winters with moderate rainfall and hot, dry summers. Most of the rainfall occurs during the winter, with an annual total of 13.11 in (333 mm). The highest rainfall in a season was 26.01 in (660.7 mm) in from July 1982 to June 1983 and the lowest 4.3 in (109.2 mm) between July 1912 and June 1913. Precipitation usually comes in the form of atmospheric rivers or bomb cyclones and some of the highest precipitation can come during El Niño years. Modesto experiences drought cycles like the rest of California where the seasonal rainfall can be a few inches below average in dry seasons and a few inches above during wet seasons. The city does not have a full storm sewer system, and many streets flood during winter rain storms. Measurable snowfall has only been recorded in only 4 months in the last 100 years with the highest amount being 1.5 inches (0.038 m) that fell in January 1962.

The weather usually does not go below 30 °F (−1.1 °C) or above 103 °F (39.4 °C). Average January temperatures range from 56 °F (13.3 °C) in the day to 34 °F (1.1 °C) at night. There are about 20 mornings per year that see temperatures at or below 32 °F (0 °C) and 79 afternoons that reach to or above 90 °F (32.2 °C). Winter days that receive precipitation tend to be milder while drier days have freezing nights that allow for frost build up until the morning. Thus, winter temperatures can vary from lows in the low 30s in dry months to 40s in wetter months. Days in the winter can occasionally be as high as 70 °F (21.1 °C), but there can also be cool rainy days as late as May reaching only 60 °F (15.6 °C). Average July temperatures range from 95 °F (35 °C) in the day to 63 °F (17.2 °C) at night. During the summer months, there can be multiple days in a row with high temperatures exceeding 100 °F (37.8 °C). This can pose health risks for people with weak constitutions or who ignore the dangers of heat stroke. Onshore breezes (known locally as the "delta breeze") moderate these high temperatures somewhat, with cooler air coming in after 8 or 9 pm on summer nights, making Modesto potentially a couple or few degrees cooler than the northern and southern parts of the Central Valley.

Climate data for Modesto, California (Modesto City County Airport), 1991–2020 normals, extremes 1927–present
Month	Jan	Feb	Mar	Apr	May	Jun	Jul	Aug	Sep	Oct	Nov	Dec	Year
Record high °F (°C)	75 (24)	80 (27)	91 (33)	100 (38)	107 (42)	112 (44)	113 (45)	111 (44)	112 (44)	104 (40)	88 (31)	75 (24)	113 (45)
Mean maximum °F (°C)	65.9 (18.8)	72.4 (22.4)	80.9 (27.2)	89.9 (32.2)	97.0 (36.1)	103.9 (39.9)	105.4 (40.8)	104.3 (40.2)	100.8 (38.2)	91.9 (33.3)	77.8 (25.4)	66.2 (19.0)	107.0 (41.7)
Mean daily maximum °F (°C)	56.1 (13.4)	62.2 (16.8)	67.8 (19.9)	73.8 (23.2)	82.0 (27.8)	89.7 (32.1)	95.0 (35.0)	93.5 (34.2)	89.1 (31.7)	78.8 (26.0)	65.7 (18.7)	56.2 (13.4)	75.8 (24.3)
Daily mean °F (°C)	47.5 (8.6)	51.6 (10.9)	56.6 (13.7)	61.1 (16.2)	67.8 (19.9)	74.5 (23.6)	78.8 (26.0)	77.8 (25.4)	73.9 (23.3)	65.1 (18.4)	54.4 (12.4)	47.2 (8.4)	63.0 (17.2)
Mean daily minimum °F (°C)	38.8 (3.8)	40.9 (4.9)	45.2 (7.3)	48.4 (9.1)	53.7 (12.1)	59.2 (15.1)	62.7 (17.1)	62.0 (16.7)	58.6 (14.8)	51.5 (10.8)	43.0 (6.1)	38.2 (3.4)	50.2 (10.1)
Mean minimum °F (°C)	28.3 (−2.1)	31.4 (−0.3)	36.2 (2.3)	40.8 (4.9)	46.6 (8.1)	50.5 (10.3)	55.2 (12.9)	55.5 (13.1)	51.8 (11.0)	42.1 (5.6)	33.1 (0.6)	28.2 (−2.1)	26.0 (−3.3)
Record low °F (°C)	18 (−8)	24 (−4)	27 (−3)	30 (−1)	32 (0)	39 (4)	46 (8)	46 (8)	40 (4)	29 (−2)	25 (−4)	18 (−8)	18 (−8)
Average precipitation inches (mm)	2.57 (65)	2.22 (56)	1.78 (45)	1.00 (25)	0.65 (17)	0.15 (3.8)	0.00 (0.00)	0.01 (0.25)	0.06 (1.5)	0.55 (14)	1.07 (27)	2.21 (56)	12.27 (310.55)
Average precipitation days (≥ 0.01 in)	9.7	9.1	8.2	4.7	3.0	1.0	0.1	0.1	0.4	2.3	5.6	9.1	53.3
Mean monthly sunshine hours	195.3	176.4	254.2	315	350.3	363	375.1	372	345	229.4	201	186	3,362.7
Source 1: NOAA
Source 2: National Weather Service

== Demographics ==
Historical population
Census	Pop.	Note	%±
1880	1,693		—
1890	2,402		41.9%
1900	2,024		−15.7%
1910	4,034		99.3%
1920	9,241		129.1%
1930	13,842		49.8%
1940	16,379		18.3%
1950	17,389		6.2%
1960	36,585		110.4%
1970	61,712		68.7%
1980	106,963		73.3%
1990	164,730		54.0%
2000	188,856		14.6%
2010	201,165		6.5%
2020	218,464		8.6%
2025 (est.)	219,652	▲	0.5%
U.S. Decennial Census

Modesto, California – Racial and ethnic composition Note: the US Census treats Hispanic/Latino as an ethnic category. This table excludes Latinos from the racial categories and assigns them to a separate category. Hispanics/Latinos may be of any race.
Race / Ethnicity (NH = Non-Hispanic)	Pop 2000	Pop 2010	Pop 2020	% 2000	% 2010	% 2020
White alone (NH)	112,466	99,347	84,592	59.55%	49.39%	38.72%
Black or African American alone (NH)	7,013	7,539	8,103	3.71%	3.75%	3.71%
Native American or Alaska Native alone (NH)	1,435	1,141	1,175	0.76%	0.57%	0.54%
Asian alone (NH)	11,084	12,899	16,929	5.87%	6.41%	7.75%
Pacific Islander alone (NH)	872	1,747	2,181	0.46%	0.87%	1.00%
Other race alone (NH)	555	380	1,190	0.29%	0.19%	0.54%
Mixed race or Multiracial (NH)	7,121	6,731	10,561	3.77%	3.35%	4.83%
Hispanic or Latino (any race)	48,310	71,381	93,733	25.58%	35.48%	42.91%
Total	188,856	201,165	218,464	100.00%	100.00%	100.00%

=== 2020 ===
The 2020 United States census reported that Modesto had a population of 218,464. The population density was 5,075.2 inhabitants per square mile (1,959.5/km^{2}). The racial makeup of Modesto was 46.6% White, 4.1% African American, 1.9% Native American, 8.1% Asian, 1.1% Pacific Islander, 23.1% from other races, and 15.1% from two or more races. Hispanic or Latino of any race were 42.9% of the population.

The census reported that 98.8% of the population lived in households, 0.6% lived in non-institutionalized group quarters, and 0.5% were institutionalized.

There were 73,959 households, out of which 36.9% included children under the age of 18, 46.6% were married-couple households, 7.9% were cohabiting couple households, 28.2% had a female householder with no partner present, and 17.3% had a male householder with no partner present. 22.1% of households were one person, and 10.3% were one person aged 65 or older. The average household size was 2.92. There were 53,044 families (71.7% of all households).

The age distribution was 25.0% under the age of 18, 8.9% aged 18 to 24, 27.2% aged 25 to 44, 23.6% aged 45 to 64, and 15.4% who were 65 years of age or older. The median age was 36.3 years. For every 100 females, there were 94.7 males.

There were 76,476 housing units at an average density of 1,776.7 units per square mile (686.0 units/km^{2}), of which 73,959 (96.7%) were occupied. Of these, 56.1% were owner-occupied, and 43.9% were occupied by renters.

In 2023, the US Census Bureau estimated that the median household income was $77,899, and the per capita income was $34,656. About 10.0% of families and 13.0% of the population were below the poverty line.

=== 2010 ===
The 2010 United States census reported that Modesto had a population of 201,165. The population density was 5,423.4 inhabitants per square mile (2,094.0/km^{2}). The racial makeup of Modesto was 130,833 (65.0%) White, 8,396 (4.2%) African American, 2,494 (1.2%) Native American, 13,557 (6.7%) Asian (1.5% Filipino, 1.3% Asian Indian, 1.2% Cambodian, 0.7% Chinese, 0.6% Vietnamese, 0.5% Laotian, 0.2% Japanese, 0.2% Korean, 0.1% Hmong, 0.1% Pakistani), 1,924 (1.0%) Pacific Islander, 31,244 (15.5%) from other races, and 12,717 (6.3%) from two or more races. Hispanic or Latino of any race were 71,381 persons (35.5%): 30.8% Mexican, 0.7% Puerto Rican, 0.6% Salvadoran, 0.5% Spaniard, 0.4% Spanish, 0.3% Nicaraguan, and 0.2% Guatemalan. Non-Hispanic Whites were 49.4% of the population in 2010, down from 83.1% in 1980.

The Census reported that 198,210 people (98.5% of the population) lived in households, 1,189 (0.6%) lived in non-institutionalized group quarters, and 1,766 (0.9%) were institutionalized.

There were 69,107 households, out of which 27,152 (39.3%) had children under the age of 18 living in them, 33,230 (48.1%) were married couples living together, 10,774 (15.6%) had a female householder with no husband present, 4,904 (7.1%) had a male householder with no wife present. There were 5,177 (7.5%) unmarried. 15,887 households (23.0%) were made up of individuals, and 6,221 (9.0%) had someone living alone who was 65 years of age or older. The average household size was 2.87. There were 48,908 families (70.8% of all households); the average family size was 3.38.

The population was spread out, with 54,012 people (26.8%) under the age of 18, 20,838 people (10.4%) aged 18 to 24, 53,116 people (26.4%) aged 25 to 44, 49,691 people (24.7%) aged 45 to 64, and 23,508 people (11.7%) who were 65 years of age or older. The median age was 34.2 years. For every 100 females, there were 95.0 males. For every 100 females age 18 and over, there were 91.5 males.

There were 75,044 housing units at an average density of 2,023.2 per square mile (781.2/km^{2}), of which 39,422 (57.0%) were owner-occupied, and 29,685 (43.0%) were occupied by renters. The homeowner vacancy rate was 2.8%; the rental vacancy rate was 9.1%. 112,065 people (55.7% of the population) lived in owner-occupied housing units and 86,145 people (42.8%) lived in rental housing units.

According to the 2011 American Community Survey 5-Year estimate, the median income for a household in the city was $49,852, and the median income for a family was $56,629. Males had a median income of $47,473 versus $37,629 for females. The per capita income for the city was $22,886. About 14.9% of families and 18.5% of the population were below the poverty line, including 27.3% of those under age 18 and 9.5% of those age 65 or over.

In September 2010, the UCLA Center for Health Policy Research released a study indicating that 32% of the population was obese vs. a statewide average obesity rate of 22.7%. Poverty was one of the factors listed as contributing to the high obesity rates.

== Economy ==
Modesto has a large agricultural industry which is based on the fertile farmland surrounding the city. Modesto is home to the largest winery in the world: E & J Gallo Winery. The Gallo Glass Company, a company of Gallo Winery, is the largest wine bottle manufacturing company in the world. Gallo provides about 3,500 jobs to Modesto residents and 2,500 jobs in other parts of the state, country, and world (meaning that most of its employment base is in Modesto). In 2023, Gallo laid off 355 of its California workers. Other major privately owned companies based in Modesto include Crystal Creamery, Royal Robbins, international award winner Fiscalini Cheese, Sciabica Olive Oil, Save Mart, Acme Construction, Aderholt Specialty, and 5.11 Tactical (formerly a part of Royal Robbins, a United States brand of clothing consisting of uniforms and tactical equipment for military). A food cannery downtown was a major employer but it closed in 2026. Ceres has a few cereal and snack factories in the area. There are several small steelworking companies in Modesto. In mid-2008, a number of road projects were underway, with roads being constructed, repaved or repaired, at an estimated total cost of nearly $120 million.

=== Principal employers ===
Rank	Employer	No. of Employees
1	E & J Gallo Winery	6,500
2	Stanislaus County	4,031
3	Modesto City Schools	3,200
4	Doctors Medical Center	2,600
5	Memorial Medical Center	2,087
6	Foster Farms Poultry	2,000
7	Del Monte Foods Inc	600
8	City of Modesto	1,325
9	Modesto Junior College	1,007
10	Sylvan Union School District	900

== Arts and culture ==
The Rockabilly genre of music originated in Modesto with the formation of Maddox Brothers & Rose on KTRB Radio in 1937. The "Hillbilly Boogie" sound, featuring the string slapping percussive sound by Fred Maddox, would become popular on a national scale and would later be the foundation for Rockabilly. Fred Maddox's bass is housed at the Experience Project Museum in Seattle, Washington.

The city's annual Architectural Festival honors Modesto's history as a testing ground for mid-century modern architecture during the 1940s and 1950s. Modesto's mid-century buildings have been featured four times in Museum of Modern Art publications.

Filmmaker George Lucas, who was born in Modesto, graduated from Thomas Downey High School in 1962 and attended Modesto Junior College, immortalized the city in his award-winning 1973 film American Graffiti. The film portrayed the spirit of cruising and friendship on Modesto's 10th and 11th streets in 1962, and inspired a revival of interest in 1950s pop culture. The Modesto American Graffiti Festival is held annually in June. It attracts thousands of visitors and car enthusiasts, along with hundreds of classic and antique cars.

Music festival SummerFest, the Downtown summer concert series, featuring Chris Isaak, Hootie & the Blowfish, The Doobie Brothers and Styx.

X-Fest, deriving from its real name Xclamation Festival, was a 21-and-over music festival in downtown Modesto. Begun in 2000, X-Fest evolved into a large outdoor event stretching for 15 blocks and featuring the world's largest disco which occupied four blocks on its own. In 2008 X-Fest featured 50 bands and a crowd of 15,000 people. Much of the profits ended up in local non-profit charities. Some business owners and citizens of Modesto complained of a rowdy and often drunk Mardi Gras atmosphere exhibited at X-fest. The last X-fest occurred in Modesto in 2015.

Located in downtown Modesto is the State Theater with music acts and independent films.

Downtown Modesto hosts a monthly Art Walk, with local artists displaying art for sale, artist demos, local gallery shows, in a multi-venue map self-guided tour.

=== Music and performing arts ===
The Modesto Symphony Orchestra, which finds its home at the Gallo Center, held their first performance when Modesto had a population of 17,000 in 1931 and continues to be a staple in the community. Not to be outdone by the Symphony, MoBand (Modesto Band of Stanislaus County), established in 1919, is one of the oldest continuously performing bands in the U.S. The group performs a free 6-week summer concerts-in-the-park series with its 130 volunteer musicians.

Modesto is also home to Townsend Opera, founded in 1983 by the late Modesto-born opera singer Buck Townsend, and Modesto Performing Arts, as well as the Gallo Center for the Arts. Modesto is also home to the area's leading professional ballet company, Central West Ballet.

The Mexican culture and traditions are displayed by the Ballet Folklorico Group "Casa Cultural Tradiciones". Folklorico groups are often at Modesto events, sharing their culture with traditional dance and colorful attire.

The Modesto Area Music Awards (MAMA) are held each October. Local radio stations and promoters nominate local bands and voting happens online. There is a black-tie ceremony and trophies are given to winners in multiple categories. A lifetime achievement award is also presented. The MAMAs were created by Chris Murphy and Chris Ricci to support and encourage local musicians.

=== Historic places ===
==== McHenry Mansion ====
The McHenry Mansion is a restored historic home located at Fifteenth and I streets. The McHenry family built the house in 1883 after the patriarch of the family, Oramil McHenry, left $20,000 in his will. The mansion was listed on the National Register of Historic Places (NRHP) in 1978.

==== Graceada Park ====
Graceada Park is an urban park north of Needham Avenue and was recognized as a historic landmark by the City of Modesto Landmark Preservation Commission in 1998.

==== Hawke Castle ====
The Hawke Castle is a historic residence built in 1929. It was influenced by the Norman architecture, and is now the property of George Thayer Real Estate.

==== The Brave Bull ====
The Brave Bull, founded in 1973, is the oldest gay bar in Stanislaus County that is still operational.

==== Crow House ====
or the Walter B. Wood House, was originally located at 814 Twelfth Street. The house was originally owned by Walter Wood and was constructed in 1884 in the Italianate style. The house has been removed from its original location, and modern renovation of the house has compromised its NRHP designation.

==== Robert Walton House ====
The Robert Walton House was constructed in 1957, as a development of Frank Lloyd Wright's New York Usonian Exhibition House concept.

==== El Viejo Post Office ====
The U.S. "El Viejo" Post Office is located on Twelfth and I streets. Wall murals inside the post office were painted by Ray Boynton, a Work Projects Administration artist. The post office was listed in the National Register of Historic Places in 1983.

==== Dry Creek Bridge ====
The Dry Creek Bridge, formerly on State Route 132, was recommended eligible for its design. The bridge is a major example of John B. Leonard's bridge designs.

==== Southern Pacific Railroad Depot ====
The Southern Pacific Railroad Depot was constructed in 1915 in the Mission style at the corner of J and Ninth streets. The City of Modesto was established as a town by the Southern Pacific Railroad in 1870. The building has been restored and expanded as the City Transportation Center.

=== Tourism ===
Modesto is known for the following tourist attractions and historical sites:

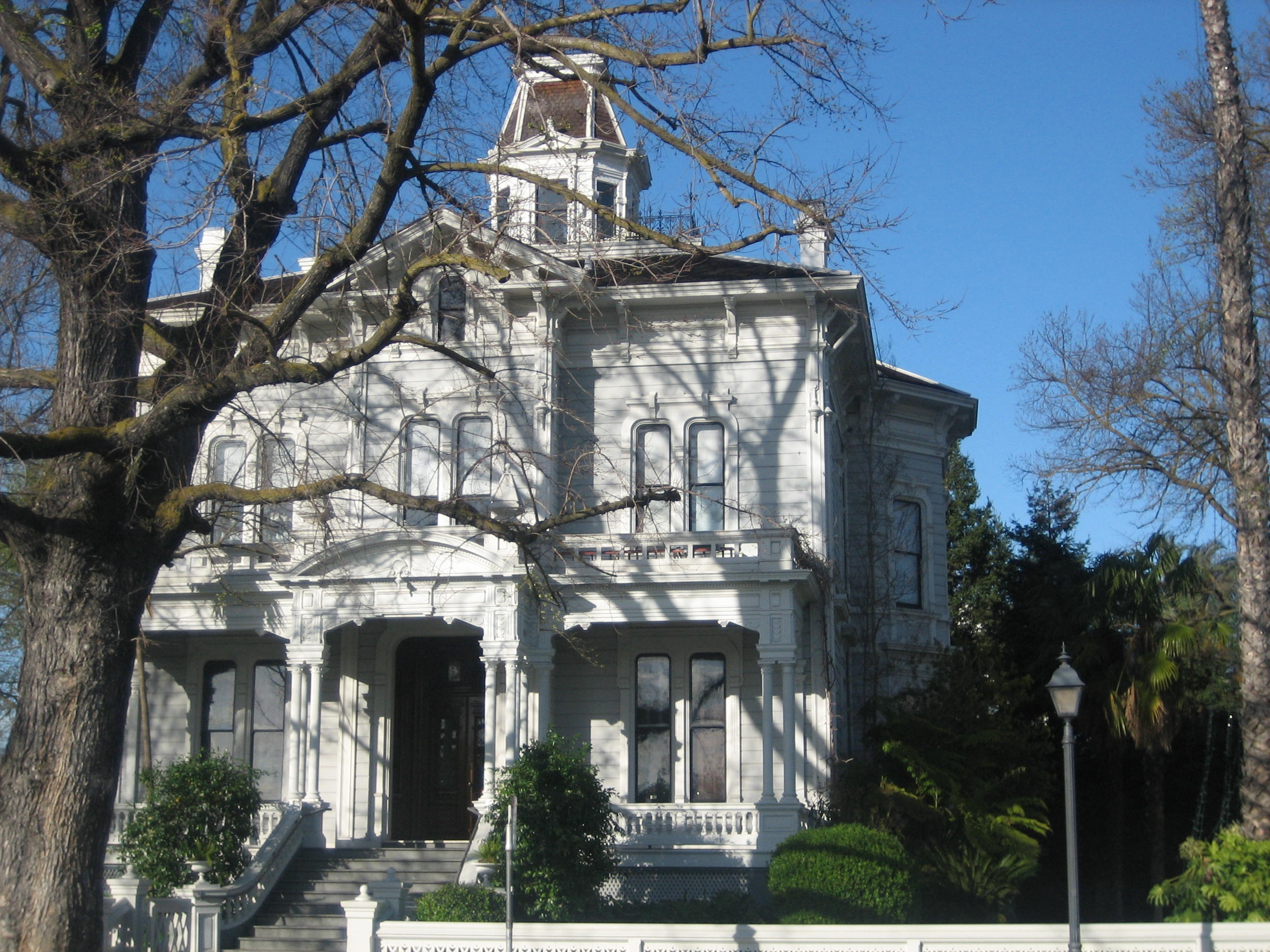
The McHenry Mansion

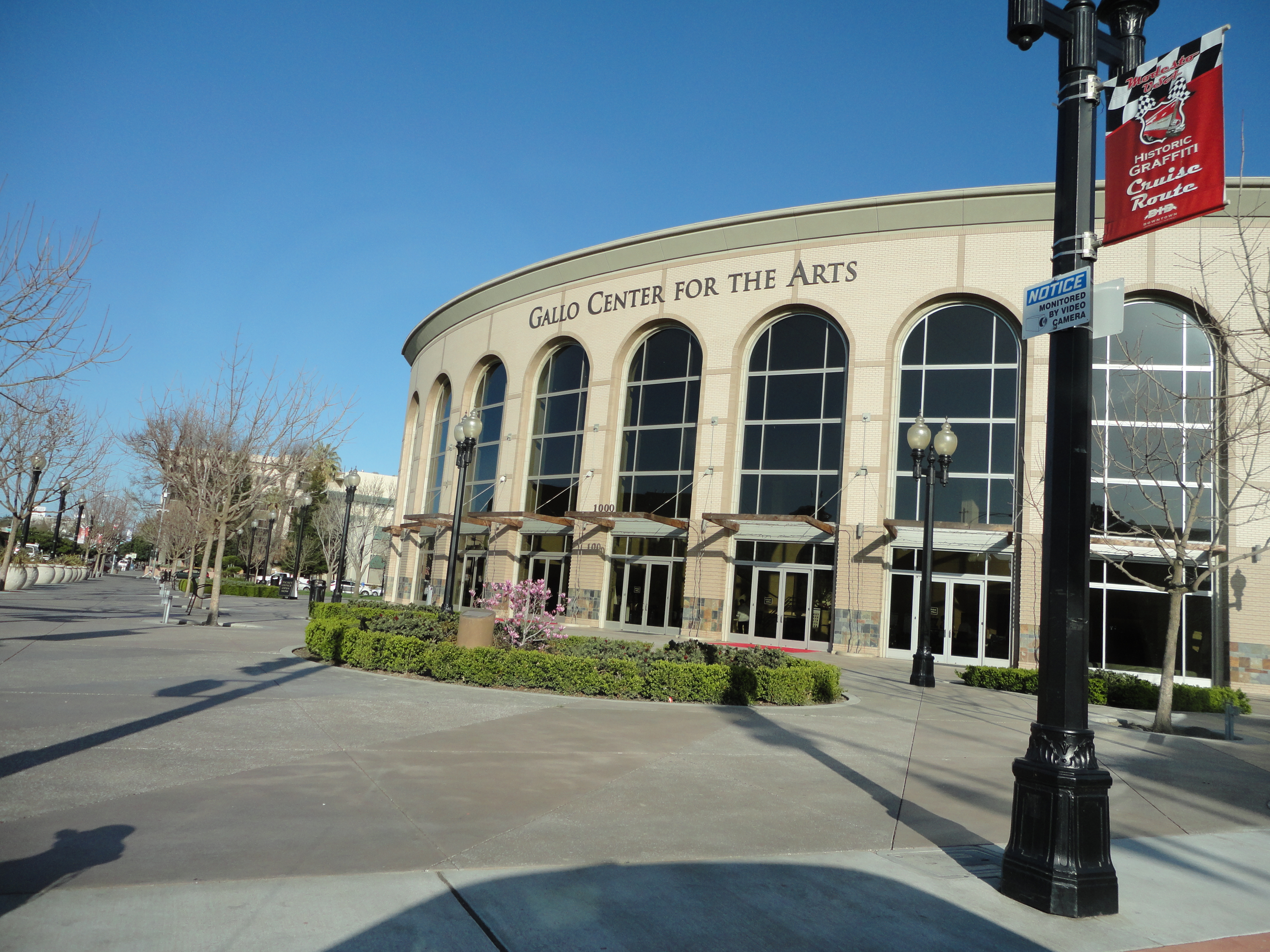
Gallo Center for the Arts

- McHenry Mansion – Built in the early 1880s by Robert McHenry, a local rancher and banker. The mansion is included on the National Register of Historic Places. Tours are given.
- McHenry Museum – Across the street from the McHenry Mansion. It is filled with tidbits from Modesto's history.
- George Lucas Plaza – American Graffiti-inspired bronze statue made in honor of Modesto filmmaker George Lucas, located at Five Points (the intersection of McHenry Avenue, "J" Street, 17th Street, Downey and Needham).
- Gallo Center for the Arts – Center for the performing arts opened in 2007 and located in downtown Modesto at 1000 "I" Street.
- Downtown Modesto – Known for having a variety of restaurants and night life, including 3 weekly farmer's markets. It also hosts a multi-venue Art Walk year-round on the third Thursday of the month, free to view with maps available.
- The State Theatre – Dating back to the 1920s, it was recently renovated and serves as a local performance arts center and as a theater specializing in independent and foreign films.
- John Thurman Field – Renovated stadium, home of the Modesto Nuts baseball team (single "A" affiliate of the Seattle Mariners team).
- Graceada Park neighborhood – An area of representative old homes (circa 1920s and earlier) with streets lined with large city-planted shade trees and a series of parks, a bandshell and other amenities. The name Graceada is based on two local residents, Grace Beard and Ada Wisecarver, who helped promote the idea of parks in the area and whose families donated the land for Graceada Park. This park was designed by John McLaren, who also designed and was the longtime superintendent of San Francisco's Golden Gate Park.

== Sports ==
The Modesto Nuts Minor League Baseball Club is a class A California League. The Nuts are the Single A affiliate of the Seattle Mariners and play 70 home games each season. The Nuts won the California League championship in 2017, and back to back titles in 2023 and 2024. In 2025, the Modesto Nuts announced that they intend to move north to Sacramento. However, the Pioneer League will add a team in Modesto, starting in 2026.

Furthermore, high school sports in Modesto are a prominent part of Modesto sports, including football, basketball, track, and other sports. In football, many Modesto football teams have longstanding rivalries, like Beyer High School and James C. Enochs High School, called the Sylvan Bowl.

Track and field competition includes the Modesto Relays named after meet director Tom Moore after his death. Thirty world records were set at the meet held at Modesto Junior College.

== Government ==
=== Local government ===
Modesto is governed under a council-manager system. The Mayor is elected at-large. The six members of the city council are elected from districts by the voters within the respective district.

According to the city's most recent Comprehensive Annual Financial Report, the city's various funds had $357,631,225 in Revenues, $1,826,668,511 in total assets, and $876,459,686 in total liabilities. The city has adopted a policy to achieve and maintain a General Fund reserve at 8% of the fund's total operating expenditures for fiscal year 2017–2018. At the end of the fiscal year, the General Fund balance was $26,745,582 or 22.5% of total General Fund expenditures.

Residents of Modesto also participate in the Government of Stanislaus County and elections for Stanislaus County Board of Supervisors district 1 as well as the Sheriff-Coroner, District Attorney, Assessor, Auditor-Controller, Treasurer-Tax Collector, and Clerk-Recorder. As of January 2013 these were represented by Supervisor William O'Brien, Sheriff-Coroner Adam Christianson, District Attorney Birgit Fladager, Assessor David Cogdill Sr., Auditor-Controller Lauren Klein, Treasurer-Tax Collector Gordon Ford, and Clerk-Recorder Lee Lundrigan.

The current mayor and council members are:

- Mayor: Sue Zwahlen
- Council Members: Rosa Escutia-Braaton, Eric Alvarez, Chris Ricci, Nick Bavaro, Jeremiah Williams, and David Wright.

=== List of mayors ===
This is a non-exhaustive list of Modesto mayors by year.

- 1923 Sol P. Elias.
- 1952 Harry Marks.
- 1960 Don D. Hammond.
- 1979 Peggy Mensinger - First woman mayor.
- 1987 Carol Whiteside.
- 2000 Carmen Sabatino.
- 2003 Jim Ridenour.
- 2012 Garrad Marsh.
- 2016 Ted Brandvold.
- 2021 Sue Zwahlen.

=== Federal and state representation ===
In the California State Senate, Modesto is in the 4th senatorial district, represented by Republican Marie Alvarado-Gil. In the California State Assembly, Modesto is in the 22nd Assembly district, represented by Republican Juan Alanis.

In the United States House of Representatives, Modesto is split between California's 5th congressional district, represented by Republican Tom McClintock, and California's 13th congressional district, represented by Democrat Adam Gray.

== Education ==
=== City schools ===
Modesto City Schools was established for students in the community in 1871. The current enrollment is approximately 32,000 students. The district operates 23 elementary schools (K-6), four junior high schools (7–8), seven comprehensive high schools (9–12), and an alternative education program that includes an opportunity and continuation school, independent study and adult evening high school. The seventh comprehensive high school, Joseph Gregori High School, was recently completed. Modesto's oldest high school, Modesto High School, also offers an International Baccalaureate program, and is the only high school in Stanislaus County accredited for this program. There are other elementary school districts within and adjacent to the limits of Modesto City Schools that feed into the high schools. They include Sylvan Union (serving the eastern portion of Modesto), Stanislaus Union, Hart-Ransom, Shilo and Paradise Elementary School Districts.

=== Private schools ===
- Modesto Christian School (K–12), Central Catholic High School, Our Lady of Fatima Catholic School, St. Stanislaus Catholic School, Big Valley Christian School, and Grace Lutheran School are private religious schools located in Modesto.
- ULCO Seminary (U.S.A.) has its international headquarters in Modesto.

=== Higher education ===
- Modesto Junior College is a two-year junior college in Modesto and has over 20,000 students enrolled and 21 inter-collegiate sports teams.
- Community Business College, vocational college in Modesto providing vocational training and job placement services to the unemployed with non-profit tuition scholarships. Offers training in medical office, bookkeeping, property management, foreign languages, medical coding and solar technologies.

== Media ==
=== Television stations ===
As part of the Sacramento-Stockton-Modesto television market, Modesto is primarily served by stations that are based mainly in Sacramento. They are listed below, with the city of license in bold:

- KCRA Channel 3 (NBC affiliate) Sacramento
- KVIE Channel 6 (PBS member station) Sacramento
- KXTV Channel 10 (ABC affiliate) Sacramento
- KOVR Channel 13 (CBS O&O) Stockton
- KUVS Channel 19 (Univision O&O) Modesto
- MyTv26 Comcast26 Modesto/Stanislaus County. Your Independent Public Access Television Station
- KSPX-TV Channel 29 (Ion O&O) Sacramento
- KMAX-TV Channel 31 (Independent station)
- KCSO-LD Channel 33 (Telemundo O&O) Sacramento
- KTXL Channel 40 (Fox affiliate) Sacramento
- KTNC-TV Channel 42 (TCT O&O) Concord
- KQCA Channel 58 (dual affiliate of The CW and MyNetworkTV) Sacramento
- KTFK-DT Channel 64 (UniMás O&O) Stockton

=== Radio ===
==== FM stations ====
- KMPO 88.7: Spanish-language public radio
- KLOVE 89.7: AC Christian
- Air 1 90.7 Christian (alternative/pop)
- KVIN 92.3: Punjabi radio
- KOSO 92.9: Country
- KPHD 93.3: Local music and news
- KBBU 93.9: Regional Mexican
- KHOP 95.1: Top 40 (CHR)
- KMRQ 96.7: Rock
- KWIN 97.7 & 98.3: Mainstream urban
- KQOD 100.1: Rhythmic oldies
- KMIX 100.9: Regional Mexican
- KAMB 101.5: AC Christian
- KJSN 102.3: Adult contemporary
- KATM 103.3: Country
- KHKK 104.1: Classic rock
- KHTN 104.7: Rhythmic Top 40
- KRVR 105.5: Classic hits
- KGIG-LP 104.9: Local-Bands & News / community radio

==== AM stations ====
- KCBC 770: Christian Talk/Programs
- KMPH 840: Catholic radio
- KVIN 920: Punjabi radio
- KESP 970: Sports
- KFIV 1360: Talk radio
- KLOC 1390: Spanish-language Catholic radio

=== Print media ===
- The Modesto Bee: Modesto's daily newspaper, published by the McClatchy Company
- Modestoview magazine, monthly entertainment magazine viewable on modestoview.com or in print for free pick-up at most restaurants, cafes, and offices in Modesto.

== Transportation ==
=== Rail ===
Modesto station, east of downtown Modesto, is served by Amtrak Gold Runner intercity rail service. Future plans call for Altamont Corridor Express service at the Modesto Transportation Center by 2026, with California High-Speed Rail later serving the station as well.

The large industrial region south and east of the city is served by the Modesto and Empire Traction Company, a 5-mile (8.0 km) short line railroad, with a web of industry tracks and many customers. At one time, Modesto was the operational center of the Tidewater Southern Railway, which had its main line down the center of Ninth Street, a major north–south street. A city ordinance passed by the city council kept electric power lines over this section of street activated long after the railroad had converted to steam power. In 2000, the last trains ran down Ninth Street. Now the railroad (owned by the Union Pacific Railroad since 1983) no longer passes through Modesto.

=== Local transit ===
The Stanislaus Regional Transit Authority operates local bus service and paratransit in Modesto, regional service in Stanislaus County, and commuter routes connecting to Bay Area Rapid Transit and Altamont Corridor Express stations.

=== Air ===
Modesto is served by the Modesto City-County Airport that lies east of California State Route 99 within the city limits. SkyWest Airlines (operating as United Express) provided air service to San Francisco International Airport, however commercial service stopped in June 2014. The airport is used for manufacturing and the shipping industries throughout California and the United States.

=== Highways and roads ===
Interstate 5 and California State Route 99 provide major highway access to Modesto. California State Route 132 links the city to Interstate 580, providing commuter access to highways into the Bay Area. California State Route 108 connects to Oakdale, California and east to the foothills. The city has added many roundabouts in an effort to ease traffic congestion within the town with varying degrees of success.

== Notable people ==
- Evin Agassi, prominent Assyrian American singer who settled in the city in the 1970s.
- James Algar, film director.
- Chidi Ahanotu, former NFL player.
- Jack Angel, voice actor: Teddy in A.I. Artificial Intelligence, AstroTrain in Transformers films, Nikki in Balto.
- Dan Archer, NFL player.
- Marcella Arguello, stand-up comedian.
- Sonny Barger, Oakland chapter founder of the Hells Angels Motorcycle Club.
- Derrick Barry, drag queen, Britney Spears impersonator, Rupaul's Drag Race season 8 contestant.
- Nick Bassett, multi-instrumentalist (bassist of Nothing, guitarist of Whirr), film and television composer.
- Eric Bell, former MLB pitcher.
- DaRon Bland, NFL player for the Dallas Cowboys.
- Tony Boselli, football player, University of Southern California, second pick in 1995 NFL draft by the Jacksonville Jaguars, five-time Pro Bowler and three-time first-team All-Pro, College Football Hall of Famer and Pro Football Hall of Famer; born in Modesto.
- Shawn Boskie, former MLB player; played his junior college ball at Modesto Junior College.
- Jeremiah Brent, interior designer.
- David V. Brewer, lawyer and judge.
- Lincoln Brewster, Christian musician and worship pastor, attended Grace M. Davis High School.
- Esto Bates Broughton, one of the first women to serve in the California State Assembly.
- James Broughton (1913–1999), poet and poetic filmmaker.
- Isaiah Burse, NFL player.
- Erin Cafaro, 2008 Olympic gold medalist for women's eight crew; graduate of Modesto High School, Class of 2001.
- Meghan Camarena, YouTube personality, The Amazing Race contestant, and television host
- Carol Channing, three-time Tony Award-winning actress and singer.
- Erika Connolly, Olympic swimmer
- Bryson DeChambeau, golfer.
- Joe Dillon, MLB player for the Florida Marlins, Milwaukee Brewers, and Tampa Bay Rays.
- John Duarte, former U.S. representative from California's 13th congressional district
- Stephen Dunn, sound engineer.
- Jack Elam (1920–2003), actor, epitome of the "bad guy" in western films; attended Modesto Junior College and had a brother who taught there.
- Chris Evans and his young partner John Sontag, notorious train robbers, operated a livery stable in Modesto in early 1890s.
- Herbert McLean Evans (1882–1971), anatomist, was born in Modesto.
- Jim Fairchild, musician, guitarist, songwriter of Grandaddy, All Smiles and Modest Mouse.
- Steve Forrest, musician.
- Ernest Gallo and Julio Gallo, winemakers.
- Don Gile, former MLB player.
- Ginger Gonzaga, actress and comedian
- Tony Graziani, Philadelphia Soul quarterback, graduate of Thomas Downey High School.
- Visco Grgich, former NFL player.
- Ralph Griswold, computer scientist.
- Bradin Hagens, MLB player.
- Chuck Hayes, basketball player, Kentucky, Houston Rockets, Sacramento Kings and Toronto Raptors.
- Lester Hayes, football player, Oakland Raiders.
- Kirby Hensley, founder of the Universal Life Church.
- Lee Herrick, California Poet Laureate.
- J.P. Howell, pitcher for the Los Angeles Dodgers.
- Bill Koski, former MLB player.
- Brad Kilby, former MLB pitcher.
- Kamara James, Olympic fencer.
- Morgan James, singer.
- Jason Jiménez, former MLB pitcher.
- Ray Lankford, St. Louis Cardinals outfielder, graduate of Grace M. Davis High School.
- Chandra Levy, intern at Federal Bureau of Prisons in Washington D.C., whose 2001 disappearance was a major news story.
- Marcia Lucas, film editor.
- George Lucas, film director, producer, screenwriter, studio mogul, graduate of Thomas Downey High School, and former student at Modesto Junior College.
- Richard Edmund Lyng, former Secretary of Agriculture.
- Jason Lytle, musician, songwriter of indie-rock bands Grandaddy and Admiral Radley.
- Roger Maltbie, golfer and television sportscaster, born in Modesto.
- James Marsters, actor, graduate of Grace M. Davis High School.
- Michael Medina, boxer.
- Joseph Meyer, songwriter.
- Kerry McCoy, musician, guitarist and member of Deafheaven.
- Jason McDonald, former MLB player.
- Michael McDonald, top-ranked bantamweight professional MMA fighter, competing for Ultimate Fighting Championship. Graduate of Grace M. Davis High School.
- Caralee McElroy, musician.
- Joan Mitchell, co-inventor of the JPEG digital image format.
- Shane Minor, country music artist.
- Donovan Morgan, wrestler.
- Johnny Mundt, NFL player for the Minnesota Vikings.
- Boaz Myhill, West Bromwich Albion and Wales goalkeeper (birthplace).
- Carol Neblett, operatic soprano.
- Reeves Nelson, professional basketball player.
- Madison Nguyen, politician.
- Travis Oates, actor, director, voice actor (voice of Piglet in Winnie the Pooh animated film and television show), script writer.
- Adrian Oliver, basketball player.
- Tyler Oliveira, YouTuber journalist, known for his man on the street interviews regarding social topics.
- Kristin Olsen, politician.
- Ashley and Courtney Paris, WNBA basketballers.
- Heath Pearce, professional soccer player for New York Red Bulls in Major League Soccer, graduate of Peter Johansen High School.
- Lindsay Pearce, contender on The Glee Project, Elphaba in Wicked on Broadway
- Scott Peterson and Laci Peterson - A married couple at the center of a 2002 criminal case, in which Scott was convicted of murdering his pregnant wife Laci Peterson.
- Brandon Pettit, convicted of murdering his parents.
- Veva Porter, artist and studio owner.
- Suzy Powell-Roos, three-time track and field Olympian and American record holder in women's discus, graduate of Thomas Downey High School.
- Harve Presnell, Golden Globe Award-winning actor and singer, The Unsinkable Molly Brown, Saving Private Ryan, Fargo, born in Modesto in 1933, graduate of Modesto High School.
- Jennie Phelps Purvis (d. 1924), writer, suffragist, social reformer
- Arthur Righs, geneticist.
- Jeremy Renner, Academy Award-nominated actor, The Hurt Locker, American Hustle. Graduate of Fred C. Beyer High School.
- Kenny Roberts, three-time FIM 500 cc Grand Prix motorcycle racing champion, two-time AMA Dirt Track Grand National Champion.
- Royal Robbins, iconic rock climber. Founder of Royal Robins clothing line which spun off to the 5.11 clothing line.
- Joe Rudi, professional baseball player, three-time Gold Glove-winning outfielder with 1970s champion Oakland A's
- Larry Scott, DJ.
- Frank Solivan, mandolinist, recording artist, composer, and leader of the progressive bluegrass band Dirty Kitchen
- Mark Spitz, nine-time Olympic swimming gold medalist.
- Byron Storer, former NFL fullback.
- Nate Sudfeld, NFL quarterback.
- Zack Sudfeld, NFL player with the New England Patriots, graduated from Modesto Christian High School
- Alistair Sylvester, ice skater.
- Florence Owens Thompson (1903–1983), subject of iconic Great Depression photograph Migrant Mother by Dorothea Lange, settled in Modesto in 1945.
- Maluseu Doris Tulifau, Samoan American human rights activist
- Ann Veneman, 27th U.S. Secretary of Agriculture.
- Tisha Venturini, member of gold medal U.S. women's national soccer team at 1996 Olympic Games; from Grace M. Davis High School.
- Gabe Vincent, NBA player.
- Darlene Vogel, actress.
- Louis Waldon, film actor.
- Ashley Walker, basketball player, attended Grace M. Davis High School, star player on UC Berkeley women's team 2005–2009, plays professionally overseas.
- Butch Walts, tennis player.
- Ron Whitney, Olympian.
- Paul Wiggin, former NFL player.
- Gene Winfield, legendary hot rod builder, automotive designer, movie car designer, also known as "The King Of Kustoms."
- Kenneth L. Worley, medal of honor recipient.
- Floyd Zaiger, fruit breeder.

== Sister cities ==
Modesto's sister cities are:

- Aguascalientes, Mexico
- Khmelnytskyi, Ukraine
- Kurume, Japan
- Laval, France
- Mengzi, China
- Vernon, Canada
- Vijayawada, India

These programs are run by the non-profit Modesto Sister Cities International.

== In popular culture ==
Films set in Modesto include American Graffiti (1973), Janky Promoters (2009), and Monsters vs. Aliens (2009).

== See also ==
- List of U.S. cities with large Hispanic populations
