= Jerime Anderson =

American basketball player (born 1989)

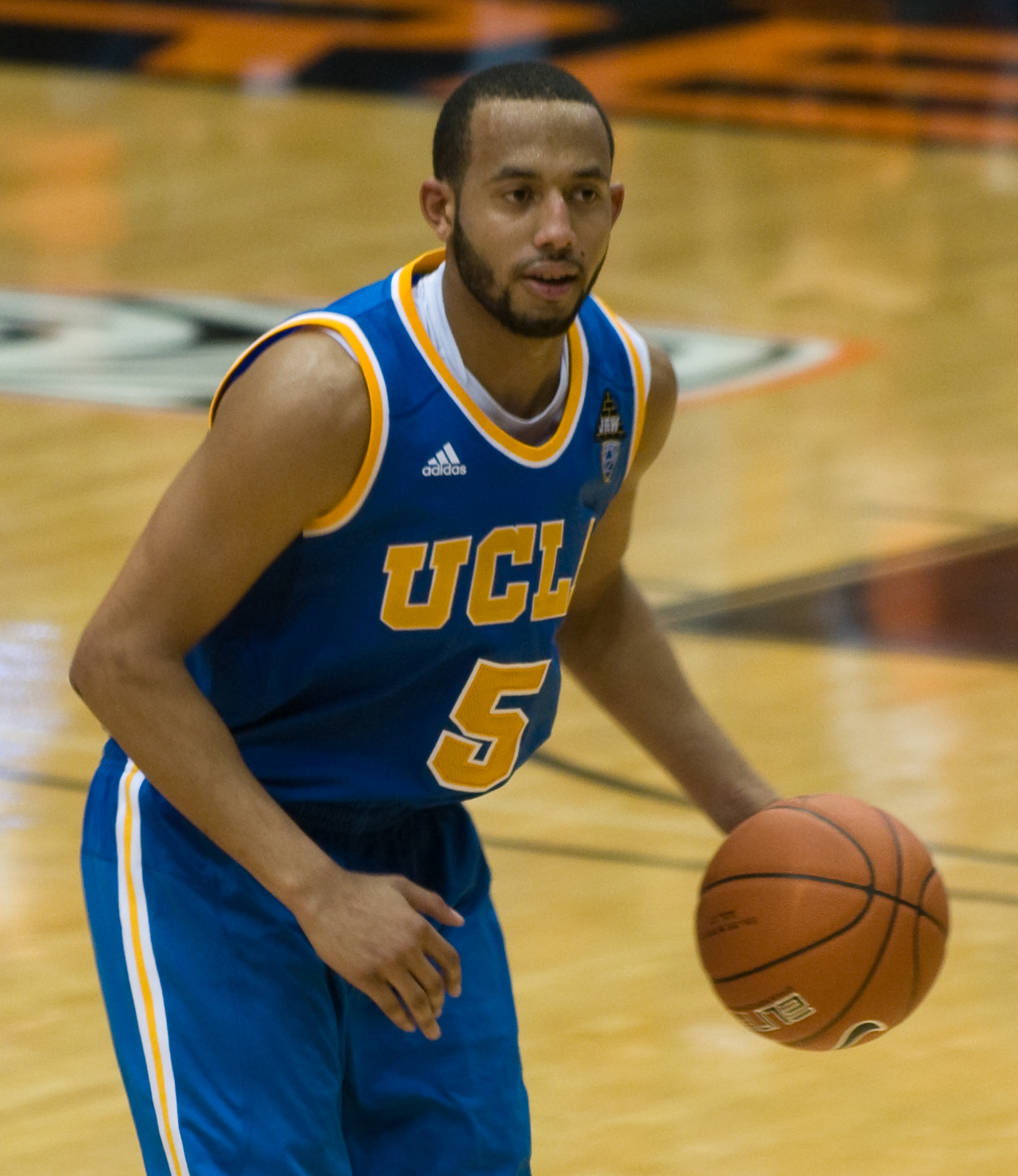
- Anderson with UCLA in 2012.

Personal information
- Born: October 5, 1989 (age 37) Anaheim, California
- Listed height: 6 ft 2 in (1.88 m)
- Listed weight: 183 lb (83 kg)

Career information
- High school: Canyon (Anaheim, California)
- College: UCLA (2008–2012)
- NBA draft: 2012: undrafted
- Playing career: 2012–present
- Position: Point guard
- Number: 32

Career history
- 2012–2013: Wolves Verviers-Pepinster
- 2013: Krka
- 2014–2015: Liège
- 2015–2016: Okapi Aalstar
- 2016–2017: Limburg United
- 2017–2018: Toros de Nuevo Laredo
- 2018: Spirou Charleroi
- 2018–2019: Mineros de Zacatecas
- 2019–2020: Fuerza Regia
- 2020: Gigantes de Jalisco
- 2021: Libertadores de Querétaro
- 2022: Abejas de León
- 2023: Astros de Jalisco
- 2024: Plateros de Fresnillo

Career highlights
- LNBP champion (2022)

Jerime Anthony Anderson (born October 5, 1989) is an American professional basketball player for Astros de Jalisco of the Circuito de Baloncesto de la Costa del Pacífico (CIBACOPA). He usually plays as point guard. Anderson played college basketball with the UCLA Bruins.

== College career ==
Anderson was a member of the UCLA Bruins for four years. Along with Jrue Holiday, Malcolm Lee, Drew Gordon, and J'Mison Morgan, he was part of a UCLA recruiting class that was considered No. 1 in the nation. As a freshman in 2008–09, Anderson was a backup to point guard Darren Collison. He was named the starter the following season, but lost his job after he was suspended for being late to a rehab session in January 2010. After Anderson's struggles the previous season, the Bruins recruited junior college transfer Lazeric Jones to compete at point guard. Jones was named the starter for 2010–11, and Anderson became his backup.

Anderson was arrested in July 2011 for stealing a laptop left unattended on a campus bench, and was convicted to 300 hours of community service. In response, UCLA suspended him for the first two games of 2011–12.

== Professional career ==
In 2012, he entered the NBA draft. After he went undrafted, he signed with Verviers-Pepinster for the 2012–13 season. In March 2013, he left Pepinster and signed with Slovenian club Krka Novo Mesto for the rest of the 2012–13 1. SKL season.

In July 2014, he signed with Liège Basket for the 2014–15 season. For the next season he moved to Okapi Aalstar. On September 18, 2016, he signed with Limburg United for the 2016–17 season.
