= Tyler Honeycutt =

American basketball player (1990–2018)

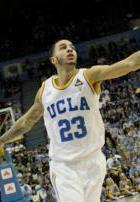
- Honeycutt at UCLA in 2011

Personal information
- Born: July 15, 1990 Sylmar, California, U.S.
- Died: July 7, 2018 (aged 27) Sherman Oaks, California, U.S.
- Listed height: 6 ft 8 in (2.03 m)
- Listed weight: 210 lb (95 kg)

Career information
- High school: Sylmar (Sylmar, California)
- College: UCLA (2009–2011)
- NBA draft: 2011: 2nd round, 35th overall pick
- Drafted by: Sacramento Kings
- Playing career: 2011–2018
- Position: Small forward
- Number: 9, 10, 33, 2

Career history
- 2011–2013: Sacramento Kings
- 2012: →Reno Bighorns
- 2013: Rio Grande Valley Vipers
- 2013–2014: Ironi Nes Ziona
- 2014–2016: Khimki
- 2016–2017: Anadolu Efes
- 2017–2018: Khimki

Career highlights
- EuroCup champion (2015); BSL Slam Dunk Contest champion (2017); NBA D-League champion (2013); First-team All-Pac-10 (2011); Pac-10 All-Freshman team (2010); Third-team Parade All-American (2009)
- Stats at NBA.com
- Stats at Basketball Reference

Tyler Deon Honeycutt (July 15, 1990 – July 7, 2018) was an American professional basketball player. He played college basketball for the UCLA Bruins, where he earned first-team all-conference honors in the Pac-10 (known now as the Pac-12) as a sophomore in 2011.

Honeycutt was selected by the Sacramento Kings in the second round of the 2011 NBA draft. He played with the Kings for two seasons and in 2013 moved to Europe, where he played for EuroLeague clubs Khimki and Anadolu Efes. He committed suicide at age 27 following a shootout with police.

== High school career ==
Honeycutt attended Sylmar High School in Sylmar, California. Considered a four-star recruit by Rivals.com, Honeycutt was listed as the No. 4 small forward and the No. 28 player in the nation in 2009.

== College career ==
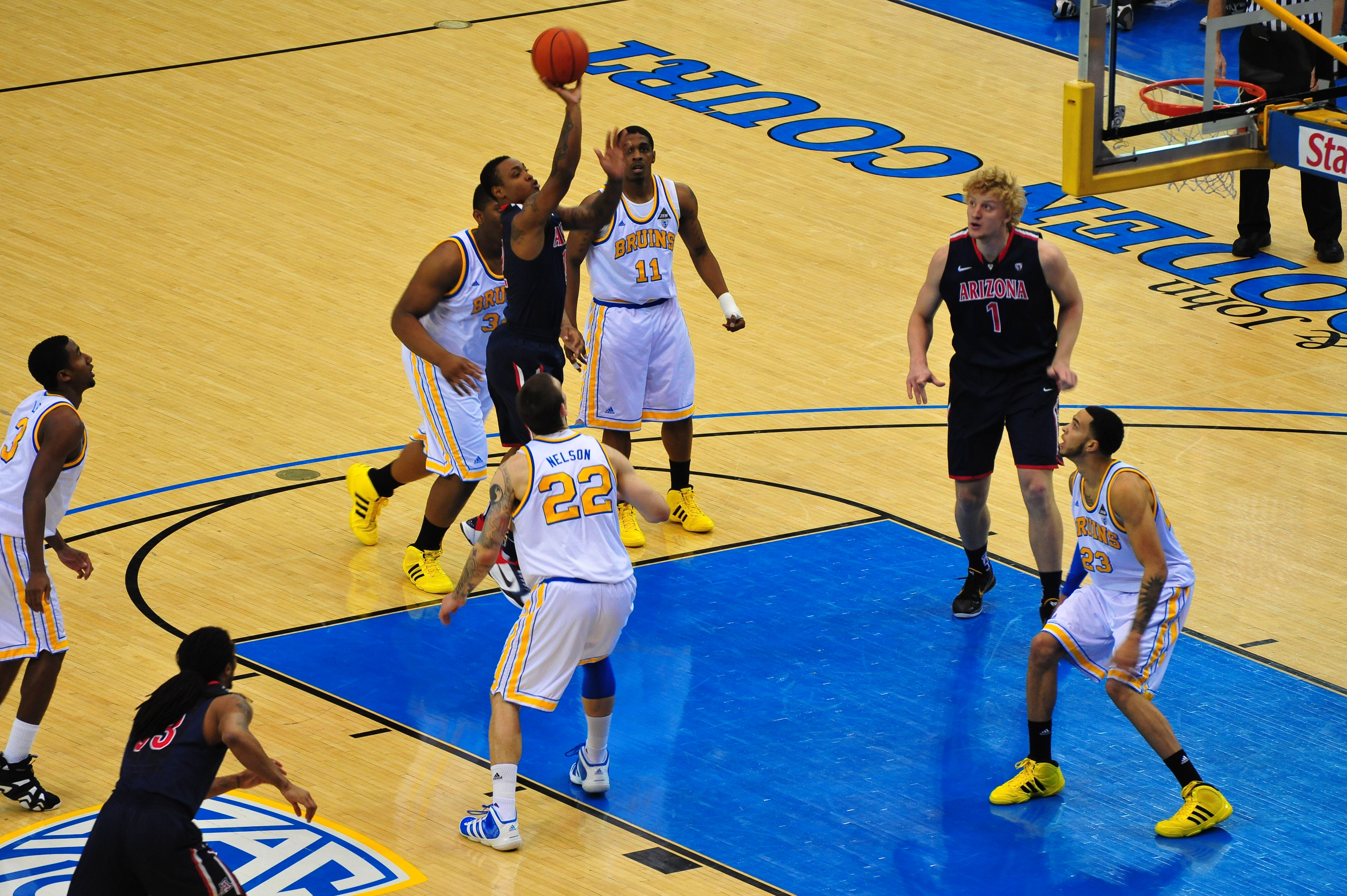
Honeycutt (front right) in a game against Arizona in 2011

In his freshman year at the University of California, Los Angeles (UCLA) in 2009–10, Honeycutt played in the final 26 games, starting 18, and led the team in rebounding at 6.5 per game. He was named to the Pac-10 All-Freshman team. In the following season, he was named the team's co-MVP (with Malcolm Lee and Reeves Nelson) and first-team All-Pac-10 after averaging 12.8 points per game and leading the conference in blocks with 2.1 per game. He declared for the NBA draft after the season. Honeycutt was projected as a late lottery pick to mid-first-round pick in the 2011 NBA draft but concerns over inconsistency and less-than-maximum effort dropped him to the second round. The Sacramento Kings took him with the 35th overall pick.

== Professional career ==
=== Sacramento Kings (2011–2013) ===
Honeycutt was drafted in the second round with the 35th overall pick by the Sacramento Kings in the 2011 NBA draft. He played in his first NBA game on December 31, 2011, and scored two points in four minutes. On January 1, 2012, Honeycutt was assigned to the Reno Bighorns of the NBA D-League. The Kings recalled him on January 24.

During the 2012–13 season, Honeycutt was reassigned to the Bighorns on November 7 and recalled by the Kings on December 17.

=== Rio Grande Valley Vipers (2013) ===
On February 20, 2013, Honeycutt was traded to the Houston Rockets along with Thomas Robinson and Francisco García in exchange for Patrick Patterson, Toney Douglas and Cole Aldrich. In two seasons with Sacramento, he played only 24 games with the Kings because of injuries and D-League assignments.

On February 24, Houston assigned him to the Rio Grande Valley Vipers of the D-League. He was waived by the Rockets on March 5, so they could sign guard Aaron Brooks. Afterwards, he rejoined the Vipers.

=== Ironi Nes Ziona (2013–2014) ===
In August 2013, Honeycutt signed with Ironi Nes Ziona, who had recently gained promotion to the Israeli Super League.

=== Khimki (2014–2016) ===
On July 8, 2014, he signed a two-year deal with the Russian team Khimki. In 2014–15 season, he won the Eurocup championship with Khimki, Europe's second-tier competition. In 2015–16 Euroleague, he made his debut in Europe's top competition. Over 23 EuroLeague games, he averaged 6 points and 6.1 rebounds per game.

=== Anadolu Efes (2016–2017) ===
On July 22, 2016, Honeycutt signed a 1+1 deal with Turkish club Anadolu Efes, where he won the Turkish Basketball Super League Slam Dunk Contest. Over 35 EuroLeague games, he averaged career highs of 9.2 points, 7.3 rebounds and 2 assists per game. On June 28, 2017, Efes officially opted out of their deal with Honeycutt, and he became a free agent.

=== Return to Khimki (2017–2018) ===
On July 14, 2017, Honeycutt returned to Moscow-based Khimki. He signed a contract for the 2017–18 season. After missing the first nine games of the EuroLeague season due to injury, he returned to the court in late November 2017. He helped Khimki advance to the EuroLeague Playoffs, where they lost to CSKA Moscow 3–1 in the quarterfinal series. Over 17 EuroLeague games, he averaged 9.2 points and 5.4 rebounds per game. In VTB United League, Khimki lost the final game to CSKA Moscow, 95–84.

== Death ==
On the afternoon of July 6, 2018, Honeycutt's mother called 911 after he had been acting erratically. She said that he had been using nitrous oxide "for six months overseas and I think it scrambled his brain." When police arrived they found that he had barricaded the entrance to his Sherman Oaks home. He fired a shot that hit a wall next to an officer, who fired back at Honeycutt. After nine hours, LAPD SWAT entered the home early the next morning, and found Honeycutt dead.

Bort Escoto, who coached Honeycutt for four years at Sylmar High School, said that "he was a great kid to be around. But he was having some problems", because in Russia he did not know the language and the surroundings, concluding that "he was basically having a hard time with the adjustment. I just kept telling him he needed to get out and meet people". An autopsy determined that he committed suicide by a gunshot wound to the head.

Honeycutt's mother later sued the LAPD, saying it failed to de-escalate the situation and get him medical care.

== Career statistics ==
Legend
GP	Games played	GS	Games started	MPG	Minutes per game
FG%	Field-goal percentage	3P%	3-point field-goal percentage	FT%	Free-throw percentage
RPG	Rebounds per game	APG	Assists per game	SPG	Steals per game
BPG	Blocks per game	PPG	Points per game	PIR	Performance index rating
**Bold**	Career high

=== NBA ===
==== Regular season ====
Year	Team	GP	GS	MPG	FG%	3P%	FT%	RPG	APG	SPG	BPG	PPG
2011–12	Sacramento	**15**	0	**5.9**	**.333**	**.333**	.600	.9	**.5**	**.3**	**.2**	**1.3**
2012–13	Sacramento	9	0	3.6	.273	.000	**1.000**	**1.1**	.2	.0	.1	.9
Career		24	0	5.0	.314	.200	.714	1.0	.4	.2	.2	1.2

=== EuroLeague ===
Year	Team	GP	GS	MPG	FG%	3P%	FT%	RPG	APG	SPG	BPG	PPG	PIR
2015–16	Khimki	23	**17**	19.6	**.520**	.359	.636	6.1	1.1	.8	**1.0**	6.0	11.1
2016–17	Anadolu Efes	**35**	1	**24.5**	.401	.303	.680	**7.3**	**2.0**	**1.1**	.9	**9.2**	**13.8**
2017–18	Khimki	17	0	21.2	.474	**.491**	**.870**	5.4	1.8	**1.1**	.7	**9.2**	12.8
Career		75	18	22.3	.443	.363	.699	6.5	1.0	1.7	.9	8.2	12.7

=== College ===
Year	Team	GP	GS	MPG	FG%	3P%	FT%	RPG	APG	SPG	BPG	PPG
2009–10	UCLA	26	18	27.7	**.496**	.345	.600	6.5	2.7	**1.5**	1.2	7.2
2010–11	UCLA	**33**	**33**	**35.0**	.406	**.362**	**.736**	**7.2**	**2.8**	.9	**2.0**	**12.8**
Career		59	51	31.7	.431	.359	.684	6.9	2.8	1.2	1.7	10.2

== See also ==
- List of basketball players who died during their careers
