= Nate Sudfeld =

American football player (born 1993)

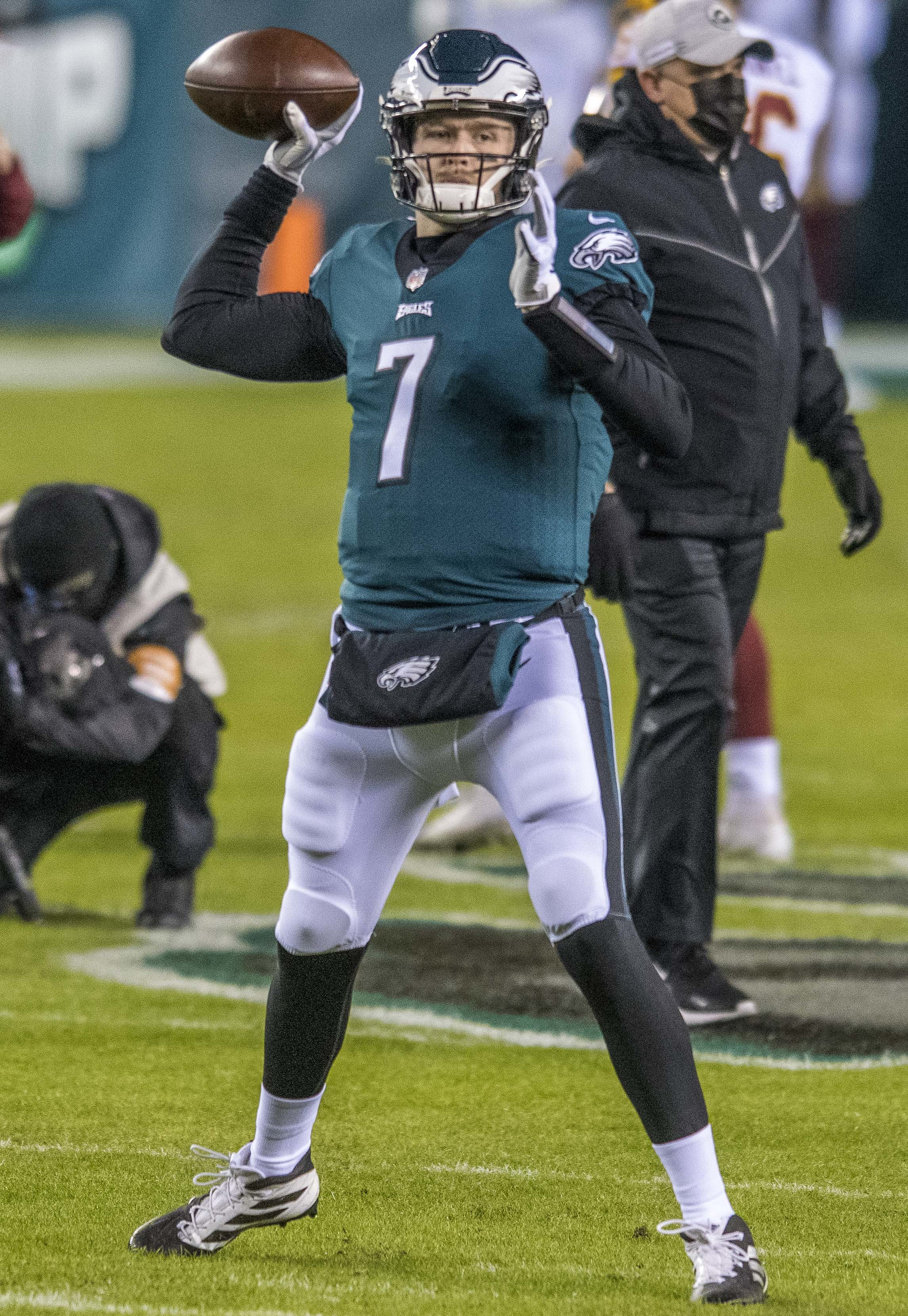
- Sudfeld with the Philadelphia Eagles in 2020

Profile
- Position: Quarterback

Personal information
- Born: October 7, 1993 (age 33); Santa Clara, California, U.S.
- Listed height: 6 ft 6 in (1.98 m)
- Listed weight: 230 lb (104 kg)

Career information
- High school: Modesto Christian School (Salida, California)
- College: Indiana (2012−2015)
- NFL draft: 2016: 6th round, 187th overall pick

Career history
- Washington Redskins (2016); Philadelphia Eagles (2017–2020); San Francisco 49ers (2021); Detroit Lions (2022−2023); San Francisco 49ers (2025)*
- * Offseason or practice squad member only

Awards and highlights
- Super Bowl champion (LII)

Career NFL statistics
- Passing attempts: 37
- Passing completions: 25
- Completion percentage: 67.6%
- Passing yards: 188
- TD–INT: 1–1
- Passer rating: 77.3
- Stats at Pro Football Reference

Nathan Michael Sudfeld (born October 7, 1993) is an American professional football quarterback who played in the National Football League (NFL) for eight seasons. He played college football for the Indiana Hoosiers and was selected by the Washington Redskins in the sixth round in the 2016 NFL draft. Sudfeld was also a member of the Philadelphia Eagles, San Francisco 49ers, and Detroit Lions. A backup during his career, Sudfeld saw his most significant playing time with the Eagles and was a member of the team that won Super Bowl LII.

== Early life ==
Sudfeld took over as the starting quarterback at Modesto Christian School in Modesto, California, as a junior in 2010, replacing the Fresno State-bound Isaiah Burse. During his time there, he threw for 3,300 yards, 33 touchdowns, and 16 interceptions, earning the Trans Valley League Outstanding Offensive Player award, second-team all-state and first-team all-district honors as a senior.

College recruiting
Name	Hometown	School	Height	Weight	Commit date
Nathan Sudfeld; QB	Modesto, California	Modesto Christian School	6 ft 5 in (1.96 m)	220 lb (100 kg)	Jan 26, 2012
Nathan Sudfeld; QB	Recruit ratings: Scout: Rivals: (80)				
Overall recruit ranking: Scout: 63 (QB), 9 (CA QB) Rivals: 86 (CA) ESPN: 14 (QB), 23 (CA)
Note: In many cases, Scout, Rivals, 247Sports, On3, and ESPN may conflict in their listings of height and weight.; In these cases, the average was taken. ESPN grades are on a 100-point scale.; Sources: "2012 Team Ranking". Rivals.com.

Sudfeld received offers from UCLA, Indiana, New Mexico State and Arizona. He initially committed to Arizona, but after a coaching and system change, Sudfeld signed with Indiana.

== College career ==
Sudfeld got experience with the Hoosiers as a true freshman, in relief duty of Cameron Coffman, after starter Tre Roberson suffered a broken leg. He earned Big Ten Conference co-Freshman of the Week honors after leading a fourth-quarter comeback against Ball State. In his sophomore year, he split time with Tre Roberson, earning his first start against Bowling Green. He finished the season with 2,523 yards, 21 touchdowns, 9 interceptions and a 142.0 pass efficiency rating.

In Sudfeld's junior year, after both Cameron Coffman and Tre Roberson transferred to Wyoming and Illinois State respectively, he completed 60.5 percent of his passes for 1,151 yards with 6 touchdowns and 3 interceptions as the undisputed starter, before injuring his left shoulder against Iowa, which required surgery, forcing him to miss the rest of the 2014 season. Despite this, he was an Academic All-Big Ten selection and was named to the Manning Award watchlist.

Ahead of the 2015 season, his senior year, Sudfeld attended the Manning Passing Academy at Nicholls State University. He passed for 3,573 yards with 27 touchdowns during his senior season.

== Professional career ==
Pre-draft measurables
Height	Weight	Arm length	Hand span	40-yard dash	10-yard split	20-yard split	20-yard shuttle	Three-cone drill	Vertical jump	Broad jump	Wonderlic
6 ft 6 1/8 in (1.98 m)	234 lb (106 kg)	34 1/4 in (0.87 m)	9 7/8 in (0.25 m)	4.93 s	1.79 s	2.92 s	4.48 s	7.42 s	29.5 in (0.75 m)	9 ft 3 in (2.82 m)	28
All values from NFL Combine/Pro Day

=== Washington Redskins ===
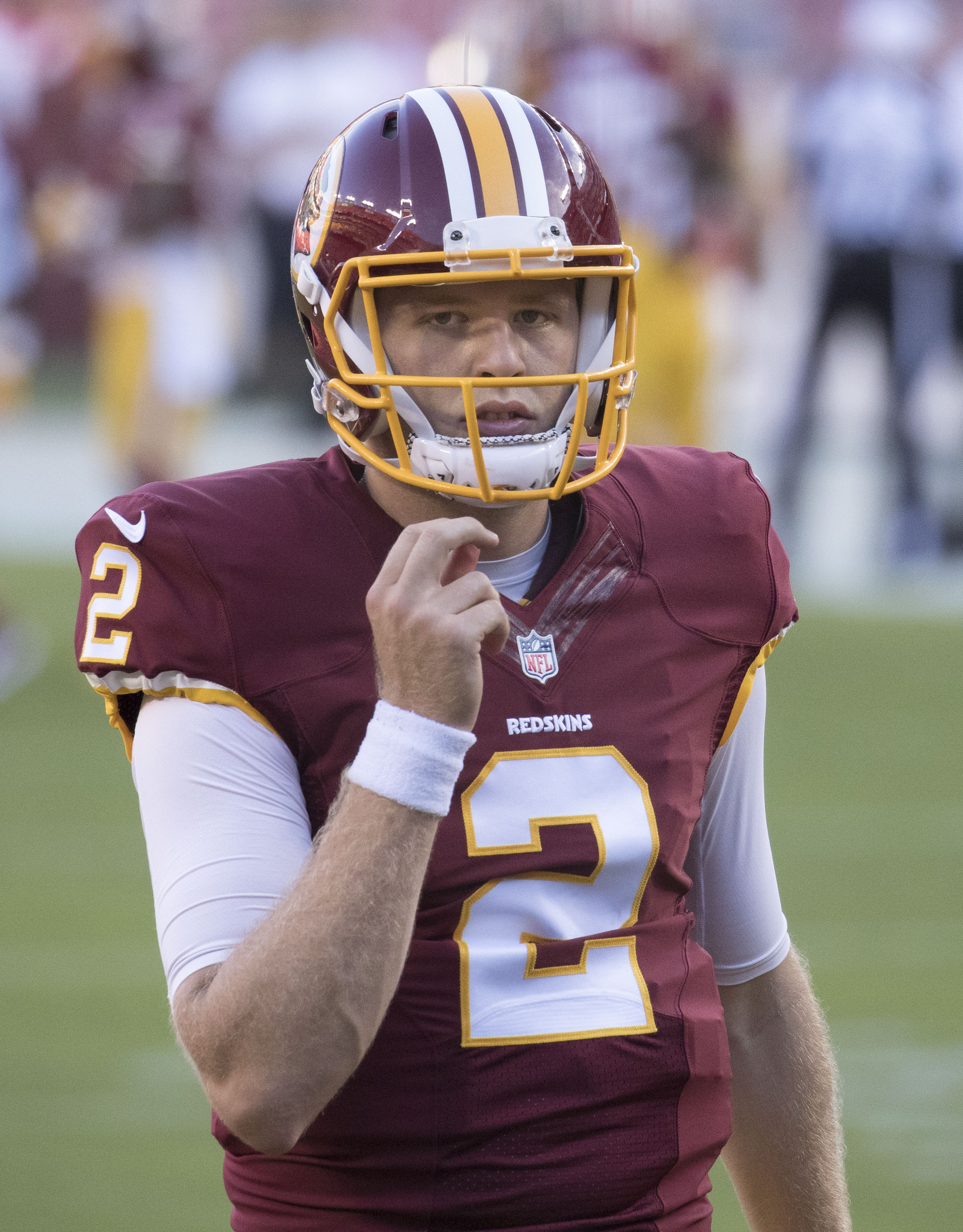
Sudfeld with the Washington Redskins in 2016

Sudfeld was selected by the Washington Redskins in the sixth round as the 187th overall pick in the 2016 NFL draft. On May 9, 2016, he signed a four-year, $2.5 million contract with the Redskins. Sudfeld did not see any playing time his rookie year, as he was inactive for all 16 games as the team's third-string quarterback behind starter Kirk Cousins and primary backup Colt McCoy. On September 2, 2017, Sudfeld was waived by the Redskins.

=== Philadelphia Eagles ===
On September 3, 2017, Sudfeld was signed to the practice squad of the Philadelphia Eagles. He was promoted to the active roster on November 1, 2017. With the NFC's number one seed already clinched, Sudfeld made his first appearance in an NFL regular season game. He saw significant playing time during the season finale, completing 19 of 23 passes for 134 yards as the Eagles lost to the Dallas Cowboys by a score of 6–0. His 83% completion percentage set a new NFL record for completion percentage for a quarterback making his NFL debut (minimum 20 attempts). The record was previously held by Sam Wyche, who completed 80 percent of his passes for the Cincinnati Bengals against the Houston Oilers in 1968. In the NFC Championship against the Minnesota Vikings, he appeared in his first playoff game late in the 4th to take a knee down since the Eagles already locked up the 38–7 victory. The Eagles advanced to Super Bowl LII, where they won a close game against the New England Patriots 41–33, giving the Eagles their first Super Bowl win. Sudfeld was active as the backup to Foles, but did not play a down during the game. On December 30, 2018, Sudfeld came into the game against his former team to replace an injured Nick Foles and threw his first career touchdown pass to Nelson Agholor.

On March 11, 2019, the Eagles placed a second-round restricted free agent tender on Sudfeld. On August 8, 2019, Sudfeld suffered a broken left wrist in the preseason game against the Tennessee Titans. Without Sudfeld, the Eagles lost 27–10. He had surgery the following day with Eagles coach Doug Pederson saying it was likely not a season-ending injury.

The Eagles re-signed Sudfeld to a one-year contract on March 24, 2020. During the last game of the 2020 regular season against the Washington Football Team, Pederson replaced starting quarterback Jalen Hurts with Sudfeld early in the fourth quarter. Sudfeld threw an interception and fumbled on the next two Eagles drives, allowing Washington to win the game 20–14. With the Eagles down by three points before Sudfeld entered the game, the move drew allegations of Pederson deliberately losing the game to increase the team's draft position, although Pederson said the decision was to give Sudfeld the opportunity to play.

=== San Francisco 49ers (first stint) ===
Sudfeld signed a one-year contract with the San Francisco 49ers on April 7, 2021. He was released on August 31, 2021, and re-signed to the practice squad the next day. After rookie quarterback Trey Lance suffered a sprained knee, Sudfeld was elevated to the active roster as the second option behind incumbent starter Jimmy Garoppolo in a Week 7 matchup against the Indianapolis Colts.

On March 10, 2022, Sudfeld re-signed with the 49ers. He was released on August 30, 2022.

=== Detroit Lions ===
On August 31, 2022, Sudfeld was signed by the Detroit Lions to be the backup for Jared Goff.

On March 24, 2023, Sudfeld re-signed with the Lions. On August 25, Sudfeld tore his ACL during a preseason game against the Carolina Panthers. He was subsequently ruled out for the season.

On March 27, 2024, Sudfeld re-signed with the Lions. On August 27, he was released as part of final roster cuts before the start of the 2024 season.

=== San Francisco 49ers (second stint) ===
On August 19, 2025, Sudfeld signed a one-year contract with the San Francisco 49ers. However, he was released following the re-signing of Tanner Mordecai on August 22.

== Career statistics ==
=== NFL ===
Legend
	Won the Super Bowl
**Bold**	Career high

Year	Team	Games		Passing									Rushing					Sacked		Fumbles	
Year	Team	GP	GS	Cmp	Att	Pct	Yds	Y/A	Lng	TD	Int	Rtg	Att	Yds	Avg	Lng	TD	Sck	Yds	Fum	Lost
2016	WAS	0	0	DNP																	
2017	PHI	1	0	**19**	**23**	**82.6**	**134**	5.8	16	0	0	90.9	1	**22**	**22.0**	**22**	0	**3**	**24**	0	0
2018	PHI	2	0	1	2	50.2	22	**11.2**	**22**	**1**	0	**129.2**	2	-2	-1.0	-1	0	0	0	0	0
2019	PHI	0	0	DNP																	
2020	PHI	1	0	5	12	41.1	32	2.7	10	0	**1**	14.6	2	12	6.0	12	0	2	16	**1**	**1**
2021	SF	0	0	DNP																	
2022	DET	2	0	0	0	0.0	0	0.0	0	0	0	0.0	**5**	-4	-0.8	0	0	1	7	0	0
2023	DET	0	0	did not play due to injury																	
Career		6	0	25	37	67.7	188	5.1	22	1	1	77.3	10	28	2.8	22	0	6	47	1	1

=== College ===
Year	Team	Games		Passing							Rushing			
Year	Team	GP	GS	Cmp	Att	Yds	Pct	TD	Int	Rtg	Att	Yds	Avg	TD
2012	Indiana	7	0	51	82	632	62.2	7	1	152.7	15	7	0.5	0
2013	Indiana	12	8	194	322	2,523	60.2	21	9	142.0	38	−34	−0.9	1
2014	Indiana	6	6	101	167	1,151	60.5	6	3	126.6	36	98	2.7	2
2015	Indiana	12	12	247	412	3,573	60.0	27	7	151.0	46	61	1.3	5
Career		37	26	593	983	7,879	60.3	61	20	144.1	135	132	1.0	8

== Personal life ==
Sudfeld is the son of Ralph and Michelle Sudfeld and has two brothers, twins Matthew and Zach, and two sisters, Juliana and Sarah. Matthew was a wide receiver at Brown, while Zach played at Nevada and played in the NFL as a tight end for the New England Patriots and the New York Jets. Juliana played volleyball for Wheaton College in Illinois. Sarah played basketball for The King's College in New York City.
