= 2010–11 UCLA Bruins men's basketball team =

American college basketball season

2010–11 UCLA Bruins men's basketball

NCAA tournament, Round of 32
- Conference: Pacific-10 Conference
- Record: 23–11 (13–5 Pac-10)
- Head coach: Ben Howland (8th season)
- Assistant coaches: Scott Duncan; Phil Mathews; Scott Garson
- Home arena: Pauley Pavilion

2010–11 Pacific-10 Conference men's basketball standings
	Conf.				Overall
Team	W		L	PCT	W		L	PCT
No. 17 Arizona	14	–	4	.778	30	–	8	.789
UCLA	13	–	5	.722	23	–	11	.676
No. 23 Washington †	11	–	7	.611	24	–	11	.686
USC	10	–	8	.556	19	–	15	.559
California	10	–	8	.556	18	–	15	.545
Washington State	9	–	9	.500	22	–	13	.629
Oregon	7	–	11	.389	21	–	18	.538
Stanford	7	–	11	.389	15	–	16	.484
Oregon State	5	–	13	.278	11	–	20	.355
Arizona State	4	–	14	.222	12	–	19	.387
† Conference tournament winner As of March 30, 2011; Rankings from AP poll

The 2010–11 UCLA Bruins men's basketball team represented the University of California, Los Angeles during the 2010–11 NCAA Division I men's basketball season. The Bruins were led by head coach Ben Howland and played their home games at Pauley Pavilion. They finished the conference season in second place (13–5), and were a 2-seed at the 2011 Pacific-10 Conference men's basketball tournament, where they lost to 7-seed Oregon in the quarterfinals. They received an at-large bid to the 2011 NCAA Division I men's basketball tournament as the #7 seeded team in the Southeast Region, where they defeated #10 seed Michigan State before falling to #2 seed Florida in the third round. They finished the season 23–11.

== Recruiting class ==
College recruiting
Name	Hometown	School	Height	Weight	Commit date
Joshua Smith; C	Kent, WA	Kentwood HS	6 ft 9 in (2.06 m)	320 lb (150 kg)	Nov 9, 2009
Joshua Smith; C	Recruit ratings: Scout: Rivals: (96)				
Tyler Lamb; SG	Santa Ana, CA	Mater Dei HS	6 ft 4 in (1.93 m)	190 lb (86 kg)	Aug 27, 2008
Tyler Lamb; SG	Recruit ratings: Scout: Rivals: (95)				
Matt Carlino; SG	Scottsdale, AZ	Bloomington South HS	6 ft 3 in (1.91 m)	195 lb (88 kg)	Apr 27, 2010
Matt Carlino; SG	Recruit ratings: Scout: Rivals: (93)				
Lazeric Jones; PG	Chicago, IL	John A. Logan CC	6 ft 1 in (1.85 m)	190 lb (86 kg)	Dec 27, 2009
Lazeric Jones; PG	Recruit ratings: Scout: Rivals: (87)				
Travis Wear; PF	Huntington Beach, CA	Mater Dei HS / University of North Carolina	6 ft 10 in (2.08 m)	235 lb (107 kg)	
Travis Wear; PF	Recruit ratings: (0)				
David Wear; PF	Huntington Beach, CA	Mater Dei HS / University of North Carolina	6 ft 10 in (2.08 m)	225 lb (102 kg)	
David Wear; PF	Recruit ratings: (0)				
Overall recruit ranking: Scout: 16 Rivals: 18 ESPN: 15
Note: In many cases, Scout, Rivals, 247Sports, On3, and ESPN may conflict in their listings of height and weight.; In these cases, the average was taken. ESPN grades are on a 100-point scale.; Sources: "UCLA Commit List for 2010". Rivals.; "Men's Basketball Recruiting". Scout.; "ESPN - UCLA Bruins Basketball Recruiting 2010". ESPN.; "Scout.com Team Recruiting Rankings". Scout.; "2010 Team Ranking". Rivals.

== Roster ==
2010–11 UCLA Bruins men's basketball team
Players
Coaches

Pos.	#	Name	Height	Weight	Year	Previous school	Hometown
C	0	Anthony Stover	6 ft 10 in (2.08 m)	225 lb (102 kg)	RS Fr	Windward School	Pasadena, California
G	1	Tyler Lamb	6 ft 4 in (1.93 m)	205 lb (93 kg)	Fr	Mater Dei H.S.	Santa Ana, California
G	3	Malcolm Lee	6 ft 5 in (1.96 m)	195 lb (88 kg)	Jr	John W. North H.S.	Moreno Valley, California
G	4	Tyler Trapani	6 ft 0 in (1.83 m)	190 lb (86 kg)	Jr	Simi Valley H.S.	Simi Valley, California
G	5	Jerime Anderson	6 ft 1 in (1.85 m)	181 lb (82 kg)	Jr	Canyon H.S.	Anaheim, California
F	10	Alex Schrempf	6 ft 5 in (1.96 m)	227 lb (103 kg)	RS Fr	Bellevue H.S.	Seattle, Washington
G	11	Lazeric Jones	6 ft 0 in (1.83 m)	187 lb (85 kg)	Jr	John A. Logan College	Chicago, Illinois
G	13	Matt DeMarcus	6 ft 3 in (1.91 m)	203 lb (92 kg)	Jr	Santa Ynez Valley Union H.S.	Solvang, California
G	14	Jack Haley	6 ft 4 in (1.93 m)	185 lb (84 kg)	Fr	Los Alamitos H.S.	Seal Beach, California
G	15	Blake Arnet	6 ft 0 in (1.83 m)	185 lb (84 kg)	Jr	Mater Dei H.S.	Laguna Niguel, California
F	20	David Wear	6 ft 10 in (2.08 m)	225 lb (102 kg)	So	Mater Dei H.S.	Huntington Beach, California
F	21	Brendan Lane	6 ft 9 in (2.06 m)	208 lb (94 kg)	So	Rocklin H.S.	Rocklin, California
F	22	Reeves Nelson	6 ft 8 in (2.03 m)	235 lb (107 kg)	So	Modesto Christian H.S.	Modesto, California
F	23	Tyler Honeycutt	6 ft 8 in (2.03 m)	183 lb (83 kg)	So	Sylmar H.S.	Los Angeles, California
F	24	Travis Wear	6 ft 10 in (2.08 m)	220 lb (100 kg)	So	Mater Dei H.S.	Huntington Beach, California
C	34	Joshua Smith	6 ft 10 in (2.08 m)	305 lb (138 kg)	Fr	Kentwood H.S.	Kent, Washington

Head coach

- Ben Howland (Weber State)

Assistant coach(es)

- Scott Duncan (College of Wooster)
- Philip Mathews (UC Irvine)
- Scott Garson (UC Santa Barbara)

Legend

- (C) Team captain
- (S) Suspended
- (I) Ineligible
- (W) Walk-on
- Injured
- Current redshirt

Roster
Last update: 2010-11-19

== Schedule ==
Date time, TV	Rank^{#}	Opponent^{#}	Result	Record	Site (attendance) city, state
Exhibition
November 4, 2010*; 7:30 pm, BruinTV		Westmont	W 95–59	—	Pauley Pavilion (4,972); Los Angeles, CA
November 9, 2010*; 7:30 pm, BruinTV		Cal State Los Angeles	W 84–59	–	Pauley Pavilion (4,595); Los Angeles, CA
Regular season
November 12, 2010*; 7:30 pm, BruinTV		Cal State Northridge	W 83–50	1–0	Pauley Pavilion (6,687); Los Angeles, CA
November 15, 2010*; 8:00 pm, ESPNU		Pepperdine; NIT Season Tip-Off Regionals	W 79–69	2–0	Pauley Pavilion (6,748); Los Angeles, CA
November 16, 2010*; 8:30 pm, ESPNU		Pacific; NIT Season Tip-Off Regionals	W 57–44	3–0	Pauley Pavilion (8,345); Los Angeles, CA
November 24, 2010*; 6:55 pm, ESPN2		vs. No. 7 Villanova; NIT Season Tip-Off Semifinals	L 70–82	3–1	Madison Square Garden (6,746); New York City
November 26, 2010*; 11:30 am, ESPN2		vs. VCU; NIT Season Tip-Off Consolation Game	L 85–89	3–2	Madison Square Garden (7,228); New York City
December 2, 2010*; 6:00 pm, ESPN		at No. 4 Kansas; Big 12/Pac-10 Hardwood Series	L 76–77	3–3	Allen Fieldhouse (16,300); Lawrence, KS
December 5, 2010*; 7:00 pm, Prime Ticket		Montana	L 44–54	3–4	Pauley Pavilion (5,391); Los Angeles, CA
December 11, 2010*; 5:00 pm, Prime Ticket		Cal Poly	W 72–61	4–4	Pauley Pavilion (5,496); Los Angeles, CA
December 13, 2010*; 7:30 pm, Prime Ticket		UC Davis	W 74–67	5–4	Pauley Pavilion (5,811); Los Angeles, CA
December 18, 2010*; 2:30 pm, FSN/PT		vs. No. 18 BYU; John R. Wooden Classic	W 86–79	6–4	Honda Center (12,499); Anaheim, CA
December 21, 2010*; 7:30 pm, BruinTV		Montana State	W 75–59	7–4	Pauley Pavilion (5,390); Los Angeles, CA
December 23, 2010*; 7:30 pm, Prime Ticket		UC Irvine	W 74–73	8–4	Pauley Pavilion (6,380); Los Angeles, CA
December 29, 2010; 8:00 pm, FSN/PT		Washington State	W 80–71	9–4 (1–0)	Pauley Pavilion (7,934); Los Angeles, CA
December 31, 2010; 1:00 pm, FSN/PT		Washington	L 63–74	9–5 (1–1)	Pauley Pavilion (9,049); Los Angeles, CA
January 9, 2011; 7:30 pm, FSN/PT		at USC	L 52–63	9–6 (1–2)	Galen Center (10,258); Los Angeles, CA
January 13, 2011; 5:30 pm, Prime Ticket		at Oregon State	W 62–57	10–6 (2–2)	Gill Coliseum (6,857); Corvallis, OR
January 15, 2011; 2:00 pm, Prime Ticket		at Oregon	W 67–59	11–6 (3–2)	Matthew Knight Arena (11,089); Eugene, OR
January 20, 2011; 7:30 pm, Prime Ticket		California	W 86–84	12–6 (4–2)	Pauley Pavilion (8,650); Los Angeles, CA
January 22, 2011; 11:00 am, CBS		Stanford	W 68–57	13–6 (5–2)	Pauley Pavilion (8,772); Los Angeles, CA
January 27, 2011; 6:00 pm, ESPN2		at Arizona	L 74–85	13–7 (5–3)	McKale Center (14,528); Tucson, AZ
January 29, 2011; 12:30 pm, FSN/PT		at Arizona State	W 73–72 ^{OT}	14–7 (6–3)	Wells Fargo Arena (7,086); Tempe, AZ
February 2, 2011; 8:00 pm, FSN/PT		USC	W 64–50	15–7 (7–3)	Pauley Pavilion (10,419); Los Angeles, CA
February 5, 2011*; 10:00 am, CBS		St. John's	W 66–59	16–7	Pauley Pavilion (8,592); Los Angeles, CA
February 10, 2011; 7:30 pm, Prime Ticket		Oregon	W 64–54	17–7 (8–3)	Pauley Pavilion (7,406); Los Angeles, CA
February 12, 2011; 1:00 pm, FSN/PT		Oregon State	W 69–61	18–7 (9–3)	Pauley Pavilion (8,534); Los Angeles, CA
February 17, 2011; 7:30 pm, FSN/PT		at Stanford	W 69–65	19–7 (10–3)	Maples Pavilion (5,856); Stanford, CA
February 20, 2011; 7:00 pm, FSN/PT		at California	L 72–76 ^{OT}	19–8 (10–4)	Haas Pavilion (9,688); Berkeley, CAe
February 24, 2011; 8:00 pm, FSN/PT		Arizona State	W 71–53	20–8 (11–4)	Pauley Pavilion (8,080); Los Angeles, CA
February 26, 2011; 1:00 pm, FSN/PT		No. 10 Arizona	W 71–49	21–8 (12–4)	Pauley Pavilion (11,986); Los Angeles, CA
March 3, 2011; 6:00 pm, ESPN2		at Washington	L 63–70	21–9 (12–5)	Alaska Airlines Arena (9,931); Seattle, WA
March 5, 2011; 2:30 pm, FSN/PT		at Washington State	W 58–54 ^{OT}	22–9 (13–5)	Beasley Coliseum (9,317); Pullman, WA
Pac-10 tournament
March 9, 2011; 6:00 pm, FSN	(2)	vs. (7) Oregon; Pac-10 Quarterfinals	L 59–76	22–10	Staples Center (12,191); Los Angeles, CA
NCAA tournament
March 17, 2011*; 6:20 pm, TBS	(7 SE)	vs. (10 SE) Michigan State; NCAA Second Round	W 78–76	23–10	St. Pete Times Forum (15,504); Tampa, FL
March 19, 2011*; 11:45 am, CBS	(7 SE)	vs. (2 SE) No. 15 Florida; NCAA Third Round	L 65–73	23–11	St. Pete Times Forum (17,771); Tampa, FL
*Non-conference game. ^{#}Rankings from Coaches' Poll. (#) Tournament seedings in parentheses. SE=NCAA Southeast Regional. All times are in Pacific Time.

== Honors ==
Malcolm Lee, Tyler Honeycutt, and Reeves Nelson were named to the All-Pac-10 first team. The three selection were the most of any team in the Pac-10 Conference. This was the first time the Bruins had had that many first-team selections since Toby Bailey, Jelani McCoy and Charles O'Bannon were picked in 1997.

Lee was also selected to the Pac-10 All-Defensive team, while Joshua Smith was named to the Pac-10 All-Freshmen team.

== See also ==
- 2010–11 NCAA Division I men's basketball rankings
- List of UCLA Bruins in the NBA

== Notes ==
- Tyus Edney joined the team as director of basketball operations on August 2, 2010.
- October 28, 2010 - The Bruins were picked to finish 3rd, with one first place vote, in the conference by the media in the annual preseason poll.
- December 10, 2010 – guard Matt Carlino left the team and would transfer to play at another school.
- The 66–59 win over St. John's on February 5, 2011, was UCLA'S first in seven tries (UCLA hadn't beaten the Red Storm since December 1968).
- February 26, 2011 – Tyler Trapani, John Wooden's great-grandson, scored the last two points of the last men's basketball game in Pauley Pavilion before the building goes into renovation for a year. The final shot is recorded as "Trapani (Wooden's great-grandson) left side layin off Haley's (Jack) missed 3-pt. try."
- March 17, 2011 - UCLA made its 44th appearance in the NCAA basketball tournament. The Bruins had 99 tournament wins, third on the all-time list. Ben Howland took the Bruins to the tournament six times in his eight years as head coach and the Final Four in 2006, 2007 and 2008.
- March 28, 2011 – Tyler Honeycutt announced that he would declare for the 2011 NBA draft and will hire an agent.
- April 1, 2011 - Assistant Coach Scott Duncan left the team to become the associate head coach at Wyoming.
- April 12, 2011 - Lee announced that he would forgo his final year of college eligibility, hire an agent, and enter the 2011 NBA draft.
