= Medical Ambassadors International =

International non-profit organization

- Founded: 1980
- Founder: Dr. Raymond Benson, MD
- Type: 501(c)(3) religious non-profit corporation under the laws of the State of California, U.S.
- Purpose: Health and healing for vulnerable communities around the world
- Location: Home office: 5012 Salida Boulevard, Salida, California 95368
- Region served: 40 countries directly and an additional 35 countries through partners
- Method: Holistic community transformational movements through participatory development processes that build on community ownership to foster sustainability
- Key people: Dr Ravi I. Jayakaran (President/CEO) Dr. Stephen Belton (Chairperson Int'l Board)
- Revenue: US $2.57 million (2016)
- Employees: 208 (2017)
- Volunteers: 50,022
- Website: www.medicalambassadors.org

Medical Ambassadors International (MAI) is a non-profit, non-denominational development organization that assists poor communities in developing countries using Community Health Education (CHE) programs. MAI was founded in 1980 by Raymond Benson and now serves over 70 countries.

== History ==
Benson worked in South Vietnam until its fall in 1975. After being evacuated, he decided to open medical clinics around the world in order to heal the ill. Five years later, he gathered a group of medical professionals together and created Medical Ambassadors International. They started work in East Asia and South America going into communities that had little to no healthcare. After a few years, however, the organization noticed a pattern occurring. Patients would often return to the clinics with the same disease that they had been treated for previously. Clinics were so overcrowded that the focus turned to primarily physical health and well-being, leaving little time to address the other healing aspects of their work. MAI's second president, Dr. Paul Calhoun, decided that something needed to be done. MAI hired Stan Rowland to be the executive director in order to address the situation. Stan Rowland had created CHE and brought this idea to MAI. This new approach changed MAI's goals and the way the corporation ran. Instead of running health clinics, MAI started teaching communities how to identify and address the causes of the diseases that were affecting them.

At the end of Calhoun's 17-year tenure, the mission strategy of Community Health Education (CHE) had entered 65 countries in 315 projects, reaching 1,212 villages. Moreover, MAI had equipped 153 training teams from other agencies and ten such agencies had formed strategic partnerships with MAI, adopting CHE as a prime strategy. Now, MAI assisted communities in improving their health as well as teaching them other vital skills and knowledge. The leadership of MAI was actively positioning CHE to become a worldwide movement, a tool used extensively in many developing nations. Dr. Robert Paul became MAI's new director.

However, this shift in strategy created confusion, as many thought that MAI assisted in health clinics, whereas they were now focused on education and prevention in regards to health. As a result, in 2006, MAI changed its name to LifeWind International, so as to address these issues of confusion between its name and its work. During the Great Recession, LifeWind suffered substantial losses of donors and was near bankruptcy. It was able to regain its footing after the recession and it continued to expand its reach globally. It also returned to its original name due to greater name recognition.

When Paul resigned from MAI, the LifeWind International Board of Directors requested Dr. John and Madelle Payne return from Nairobi, Kenya, where they served as MAI's East Africa Regional Coordinators, to lead the work. They assumed leadership in July 2009.

Over time, new programs were developed with Women's Cycle of Life, Disability CHE, and others. MAI continued to cooperate with other organizations, leading to the formation of a global CHE network.

The Paynes retired in June 2017 and began a part-time position as MAI Advancement Facilitators. The Board Search Committee offered the President's role to Dr. Ravi Jayakaran, who was working as a strategic development leader with the e3Partners and I Am Second organizations in Texas. In 2017, Jayakaran took over as president of MAI.

== Community Health Education ==
CHE is a program dedicated to educating communities to identify their problems and solve them with little to no outside influence.C HE's goal is a holistic one, designed to address all aspects of a person's health. Prospective community members are taught simple lessons that they can then go and teach to their neighbors. In this way, communities become self-sustaining, instead of relying on outside help to alleviate their needs. CHE is used by a host of various organizations, and a global CHE network was created to connect those organizations together, as well as to provide a place for individuals interested in CHE to see what organizations include in their work. This program is now being taught in 126 countries.
