= Salida =

Salida (Spanish for exit) may refer to some places in the United States:

- Salida, California
- Salida, Colorado
