= BC Khimki =

Khimki
- Nickname: Yellow-Blues
- Leagues: Super League 1
- Founded: 5 January 1997; 29 years ago
- History: BC Khimki (1997–Present)
- Arena: Khimki Basketball Center
- Capacity: 4,000
- Location: Khimki, Moscow Region, Russia
- Team colors: Blue and Yellow
- President: Dmitry Golubkov
- Head coach: Roman Semerninov
- Championships: 2 EuroCup; 1 VTB United League; 1 Russian Cup
- Website: bckhimki.com
Home	Away	Third

BC Khimki (Russian: БК Химки) is a Russian professional basketball team that is based in Khimki, Moscow Oblast. The club's senior men's first team participates in the Russian Basketball Super League 1. The club's full official name is BC Khimki Moscow Region. Khimki has a Moscow-based rivalry with the Russian club CSKA Moscow.

== History ==
BC Khimki was founded on January 5, 1997, and won the first seasons' championship of its regional league, to earn a place in the Russian Superleague A. The following year, Khimki positioned itself among the top 10 basketball clubs in Russia, guaranteeing a place in the 3rd-tier European cup competition, the FIBA Korać Cup. There, the team competed against a group of defeated leaders of the Turkish Super League, YUBA Liga, and Bulgarian League.

The team remained in a middle position in the Russian Super League until the 2002–03 season. That year the club finished in fourth place in the Russian Super League. During the subsequent years, the Russian high society behind the club decided to make the roster stronger, by signing players such as Gianmarco Pozzecco, Óscar Torres, and Rubén Wolkowyski.

The team then participated several times in European-wide continental tournaments, like the 3rd-tier level FIBA EuroChallenge and the 2nd-tier level EuroCup. In 2006, Khimki played in the EuroChallenge's championship game, against Joventut Badalona. On 7 October 2006, Khimki played in a game against the NBA club the Los Angeles Clippers, losing by a score of 98 to 91.

Khimki won the Russian Cup title in 2008, and played in the EuroCup championship game in 2009. The team played in the European 1st-tier level EuroLeague, for the first time in the 2009–10 season, and also played in the EuroLeague during the 2010–11 season and the 2012–13 season. The team also won the EuroCup championship in 2012 and 2015.

== Arenas ==
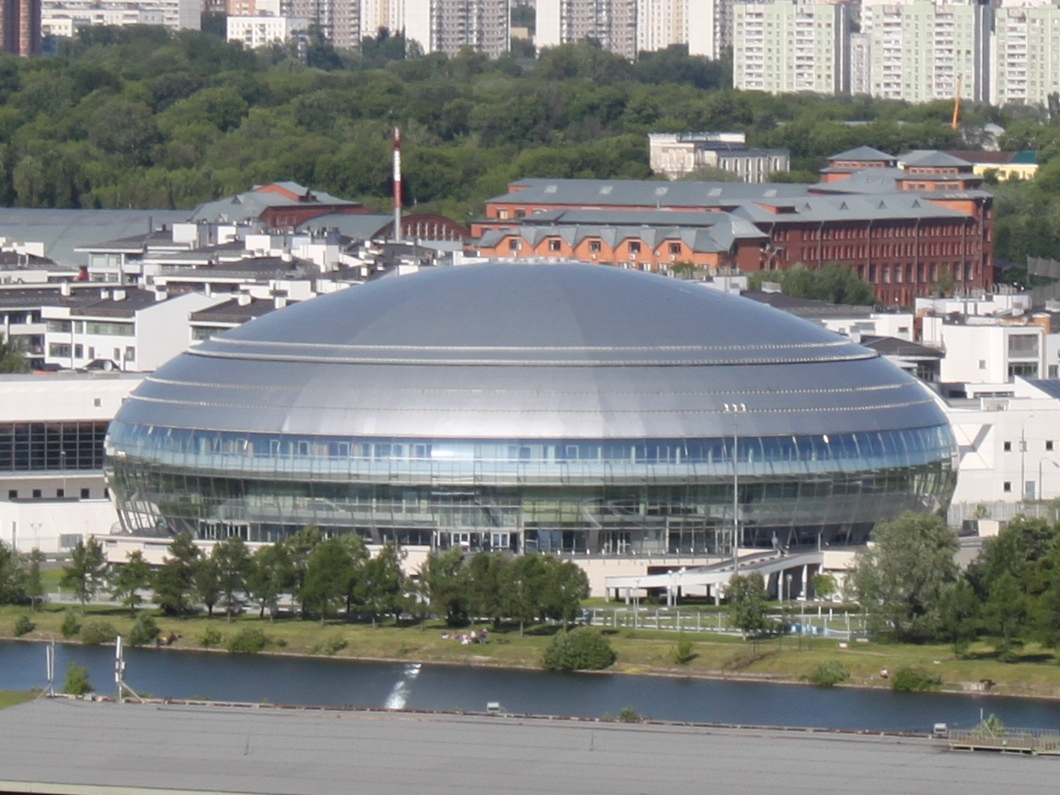
Exterior of the 5,000 seat Krylatskoye Sports Palace.

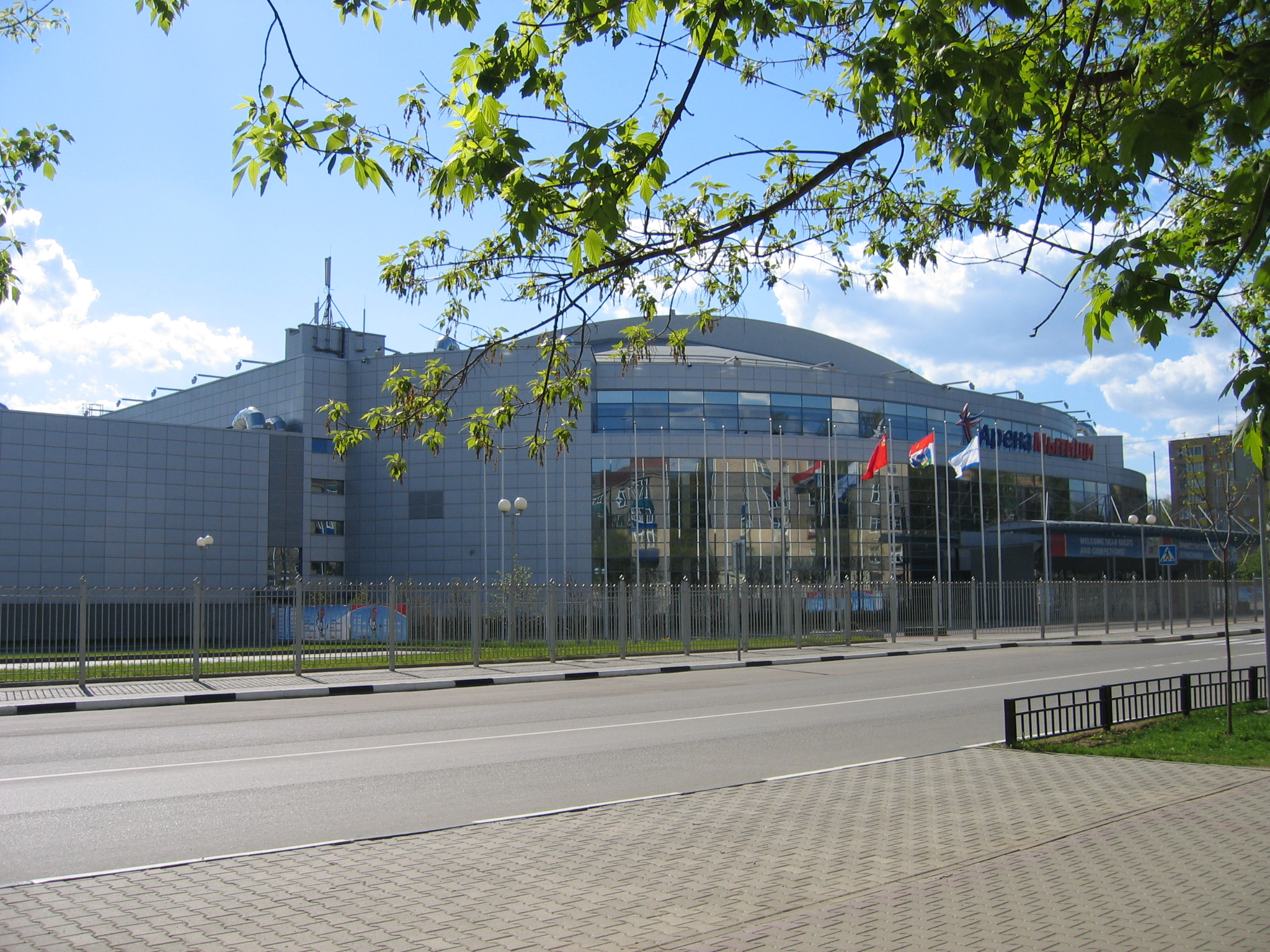
Exterior of the 7,280 seat Mytishchi Arena.

Khimki plays its VTB United League and EuroCup home games at the 4,000 seat Khimki Basketball Center. In the 2015–16 season, Khimki played its EuroLeague home games at the 5,000 seat Krylatskoye Sports Palace. For the 2017–18 season, Khimki began playing its home EuroLeague games at the 7,280 seat Mytishchi Arena.

== Club identity ==
=== Logos ===
On August 9, 2016, Khimki adopted a new logo to celebrate its 20th anniversary.

The original Khimki logo (used until 2016).

The club's 20 year anniversary logo (2016–present).

== Season by season ==
Season	Tier	Division	Pos.	Russian Cup	European competitions		Other competitions	
2001–02	1	Superleague A	8th					
2002–03	1	Superleague A	4th	Semifinalist				
2003–04	1	Superleague A	5th	Fourth place				
2004–05	1	Superleague A	4th	Fourth place	3 FIBA Europe League	3rd		
2005–06	1	Superleague A	2nd	Runner-up	3 FIBA EuroCup	RU		
2006–07	1	Superleague A	3rd		2 ULEB Cup	T16		
2007–08	1	Superleague A	2nd	Winner	2 ULEB Cup	T16		
2008–09	1	Superleague A	2nd		2 Eurocup	RU	United League	RU
2009–10	1	Superleague A	2nd	Fourth place	1 Euroleague	T16	United League	4th
2010–11	1	PBL	2nd		1 Euroleague	RS	United League	C
2011–12	1	PBL	2nd		2 Eurocup	C	United League	QF
2012–13	1	PBL	2nd		1 Euroleague	T16	United League	4th
2013–14	1	United League ^{1}	5th	Semifinalist	2 Eurocup	T16		
2014–15	1	United League	2nd	Quarterfinalist	2 Eurocup	C		
2015–16	1	United League	4th		1 Euroleague	T16		
2016–17	1	United League	2nd	Top 16	2 EuroCup	QF		
2017–18	1	United League	2nd		1 EuroLeague	QF		
2018–19	1	United League	2nd	Top 16	1 EuroLeague	RS		
2019–20	1	United League	1st		1 EuroLeague	RS		
2020–21	1	United League	7th		1 EuroLeague	RS		
2021–22	2	Super League 1	11th	Top 32				
2022–23	2	Super League 1	4th	Fourth place				
2023–24	2	Super League 1	2nd	Top 16				

Notes:

^1 In 2013, the VTB United League replaced the PBL as Russia's first tier league.

== Titles and honours ==
=== Domestic competitions ===
- Russian Championship (RSL / PBL / VTB):
  - Runners-up (11): 2006, 2008, 2009, 2010, 2011, 2012, 2013, 2015, 2017, 2018, 2019
- Russian Cup:
  - Winners (1): 2008
  - Runners-up (1): 2006

=== Regional competitions ===
- VTB United League:
  - Winners (1): 2011
  - Runners-up (4): 2015, 2017, 2018, 2019

=== European competitions ===
- EuroCup:
  - Winners (2): 2012, 2015
  - Runners-up (1): 2009
- FIBA EuroChallenge:
  - Runners-up (1): 2006

=== Other competitions ===
- Sevilla, Spain Invitational Game:
  - Winners (1): 2009
- Fuenlabrada, Spain Invitational Game:
  - Winners (1): 2009
- Trofeo Costa de Sol
  - Winners (1): 2015
- Gomelsky Cup:
  - Winners (1): 2017

== Players ==
=== Current roster ===
Note: Flags indicate national team eligibility at FIBA-sanctioned events. Players may hold other non-FIBA nationalities not displayed.

BC Khimki roster
Players	Coaches
Pos. / No. / Nat. / Name / Ht. / Wt. / Age	Head coach: (Russia) Roman Semerninov; Legend: (C) Team captain; Injured; Roster; Updated: August 12, 2021

=== Notable players ===
Note: Flags indicate national team eligibility at FIBA-sanctioned events. Players may hold other non-FIBA nationalities not displayed.

Criteria

To appear in this section a player must have either:

- Set a club record or won an individual award while at the club
- Played at least one official international match for their national team at any time
- Played at least one official NBA match at any time.

- (Russia) Vitaly Fridzon
- (Russia) Vasily Karasev
- (Russia) Sergei Karaulov
- (Russia) Kelly McCarty
- (Russia) Sergei Monia
- (Russia) Nikita Morgunov
- (Russia) Timofey Mozgov
- (Russia) Pavel Podkolzin
- (Russia) Aleksey Savrasenko
- (Russia) Nikita Shabalkin
- (Russia) Alexey Shved
- (Belarus) Vladimir Veremeenko
- (Argentina) Carlos Delfino
- (Argentina) Rubén Wolkowyski
- (Belize) Milt Palacio
- (Venezuela) Óscar Torres
- (Bosnia and Herzegovina) Ratko Varda
- (Finland) Teemu Rannikko
- (Finland) Petteri Koponen
- (France) Jérôme Moïso
- (Germany) Ademola Okulaja
- (Republic of Ireland) Pat Burke
- (Italy) Gianmarco Pozzecco
- (Lithuania) Paulius Jankūnas
- (Lithuania) Robertas Javtokas
- (Latvia) Jānis Timma
- (Poland) Maciej Lampe
- (Croatia) Zoran Planinić
- (Croatia) Krešimir Lončar
- (Slovenia) Zoran Dragić
- (Montenegro) Marko Todorović
- (Spain) Carlos Cabezas
- (Spain) Jorge Garbajosa
- (Spain) Raül López
- (United States) Melvin Booker
- (United States) Daniel Ewing
- (United States) Keith Langford
- (United States) Chris Quinn
- (United States) Clay Tucker
- (United States) Paul Davis
- (United States) James Augustine
- (United States) Tyler Honeycutt
- (United States) Thomas Robinson
- (United States) James Anderson
- (United States) Jordan Mickey

== Head coaches ==
- (Russia) Sergey Elevich: 1997–2007
- (Lithuania) Kęstutis Kemzūra: 2007–2008
- (Italy) Sergio Scariolo: 2008–2010
- (Russia) Oleg Meleshchenko: 2010–2011
- (Lithuania) Rimas Kurtinaitis: 2011–2016, 2019–2021
- (Montenegro) Duško Ivanović: 2016–2017
- (Greece) Georgios Bartzokas: 2017–2019
- (Russia) Andrey Maltsev: 2021–2025
- (Russia) Gleb Plotnikov: 2025–2026
- (Russia) Roman Semerninov: 2026–present

== See also ==
- Moscow Basketball derby
