= Wood Colony, California =

Unincorporated area in Stanislaus County, California, United States

Coordinates: 37.682°N 121.068°W

Wood Colony is an unincorporated area in Stanislaus County, California, United States, located to the west of Modesto. It has been designated as a "Community of Interest" by Stanislaus County's Local Area Formation Commission (LAFCO).

== History ==
Wood Colony derives its name from one of the first settlers, Ebenezer "Eben" Wood, who purchased 1,760 acres from Timothy Paige in 1869. Eben Wood and his wife, Sarah A. (Wiley) Wood, moved to the property and lived in a small frame house there until 1894. Eben Wood died May 18, 1902, and was buried in Citizen's Cemetery (Modesto Cemetery) on Scenic Drive. Wood Creek near Sonora is also named for Eben Wood.

Old German Baptist Brethren church members began settling in Wood Colony in the 1870s. Today, the Old German Baptist Brethren, Old German Baptist Brethren New Conference and Old Brethren church members make up about one-third of the population of Wood Colony.

California's largest and oldest walnut tree is in Wood Colony on the corner of Dakota and North avenues was planted by early settler, Jacob Cover. Cover planted the first walnut orchard in Stanislaus County.Stanislaus Stepping Stones Newsletter.

The first Wood Colony Country Fair and Colony Tour was held on Saturday, August 16, 2014.

Wood Colony's Durrer Barn is mentioned in an article in the October 2014 issue of National Geographic (magazine).

== Schools ==
- Brethren Heritage School - Private school, K-12 grades, student enrollment - 95
- Hart-Ransom Union School District
- Sierra Vista Kirk Baucher School - Non-public school

== Wood Colony Cemetery ==
On January 8, 1910, a committee of Old German Baptist Brethren church members, John J. Wagoner, Weston H. Mohler, Jacob A. Cover, Samuel E. Garber, and Clarence L. Woodbridge, were appointed to plot out an area for the use of parking, a church building, and a cemetery. Jacob Cover drafted the layout plan. The first cemetery burial was in 1912. The current location of the cemetery is 3511 Dakota Avenue, on the west side of Dakota between Murphy and Beckwith roads.

== Politics ==
Wood Colony is governed by the Stanislaus County Board of Supervisors in District 3.

In 1996, the City of Modesto sought to annex Wood Colony's "Beckwith Triangle" which was voted down by LAFCO. At an August 2013 Modesto Planning Commission workshop, Modesto city planners unveiled a new general plan update that doubled the size of land they want to annex in and around the Beckwith Triangle. The exact acreage of the expansion was 1,825 acres. The zoning in the Beckwith-Dakota Comprehensive Planning District is "Regional Commercial" while the expansion was designated a mix of "Business Park-Industrial" with a large green asterisk denoting a "Regional Park". The current map shows a mix of regional commercial and business park slated for Wood Colony.

On January 28, 2014, after a confusing flurry of different map options the Modesto City Council voted 5-2 to adopt the "Mayor's Alternative" map for the General Plan update

NPR aired a story on the proposed annexation of Wood Colony on September 24, 2014.

Modesto's Mayor Garrad Marsh held a Town Hall meeting on Saturday, September 20, 2014, where he stated that Modesto would not annex Wood Colony if Stanislaus County signed a pledge stating they would do the same. Stanislaus County replied with a letter dated September 25, 2014. Stanislaus County District 3 Supervisor Terry Withrow directed Stanislaus County's CEO, Stan Risen, to draft the letter accepting Mayor Marsh's offer to sign a pledge.

With the election of a new Modesto Mayor, Ted Brandvold, along with several new city council members, 2016 saw a "reset" to Modesto's 1995 General Plan boundaries. The 1995 General Plan includes the Beckwith Triangle area of Wood Colony and all of Salida, California, leaving the two unincorporated communities still susceptible to annexation by the City of Modesto.

In January 2017, the Stanislaus County Board of Supervisors approved a consent item to form a Municipal Advisory Council for Wood Colony. The move was not without controversy but was not brought up at the board meeting. The Stanislaus County Board of Supervisors approved the MAC council for Wood Colony on a 5–0 vote on Tuesday, February 28, 2017.

== Almond Tree Varietal "Wood Colony" ==
David Elmer Blickenstaff (1911–1977) a Wood Colony resident and descendant of early settlers, patented an almond varietal and named it in honor of his community.
