= Modesto Christian School =

Coordinates: 37.7225°N 121.0785°W

- Salida, California; United States

Information
- Type: Private
- Religious affiliation: Christian
- Established: 1962
- Principals: Cynthia Jewell (9-12); Vicki Olson (K-8)
- Grades: Preschool–12th grade
- Gender: coeducational
- Enrollment: 343 (2013–14)
- Campus size: 32 acres
- Campus type: Suburban
- Colors: Navy and Red
- Mascot: Crusaders
- Website: www.modestochristian.org

Modesto Christian School is a private Christian school in Salida, California, on the outskirts of Modesto. It was formerly affiliated with the Assemblies of God; it was founded in 1962 by Pastor Roy Blakeley, who had previously founded Neighborhood Church. It was a charter member of the Association of Christian Schools International. The school educates children from preschool through 12th grade and is divided into an elementary, a middle, and a high school, which are housed on the same campus. It is a small school; combined enrollment was 285 in 2009 and 343 in 2013–14. The first graduating class, in 1976, consisted of 8 students; in 2007 there were 86.

In 2016, a group headed by Glen Villanueva, a local physician, purchased Modesto Christian School and part of the campus from Neighborhood Church. The school is now under the ownership of Modesto Christian School Incorporated, and is now non-denominational. A charter school, Great Valley Academy, bought the remainder of the campus.

Class sizes are small, there is a strict dress code, and in addition to Bible class and weekly church services, each class session starts with a prayer.

The school values athletics highly. Greg Pearce, the athletics director and dean of students, said in 2009: "Our first goal is to prepare our kids spiritually. Our second is to prepare them academically and our third priority has to do with sports participation." It offers baseball, softball, football, tennis, track and field, volleyball, wrestling, and boys' and girls' basketball, golf, and soccer. It is a member of the Trans-Valley League of the Sac-Joaquin Section (CIF). The sports program has been very successful; Modesto Christian was named Cal Hi Sports Division V State School of the Year in 2006 and as of March 2007 had won four state championships, 10 Northern California championships, topped the Sac-Joaquin Section 17 times and the league 35 times. In 2014 three seniors signed letters of intent to attend top-tier colleges on sports scholarships and the football team was defeated in the divisional championship.

The school has also been praised for its drama program.

== Alumni ==
- Isaiah Burse, football player
- Chuck Hayes, basketball player
- Richard Midgley, basketball player, former Modesto Christian head basketball coach
- Reeves Nelson, basketball player
- D. J. Seeley, basketball player
- Nate Sudfeld, football player
- Zach Sudfeld, football player
