= Isaiah Burse =

American football player (born 1991)

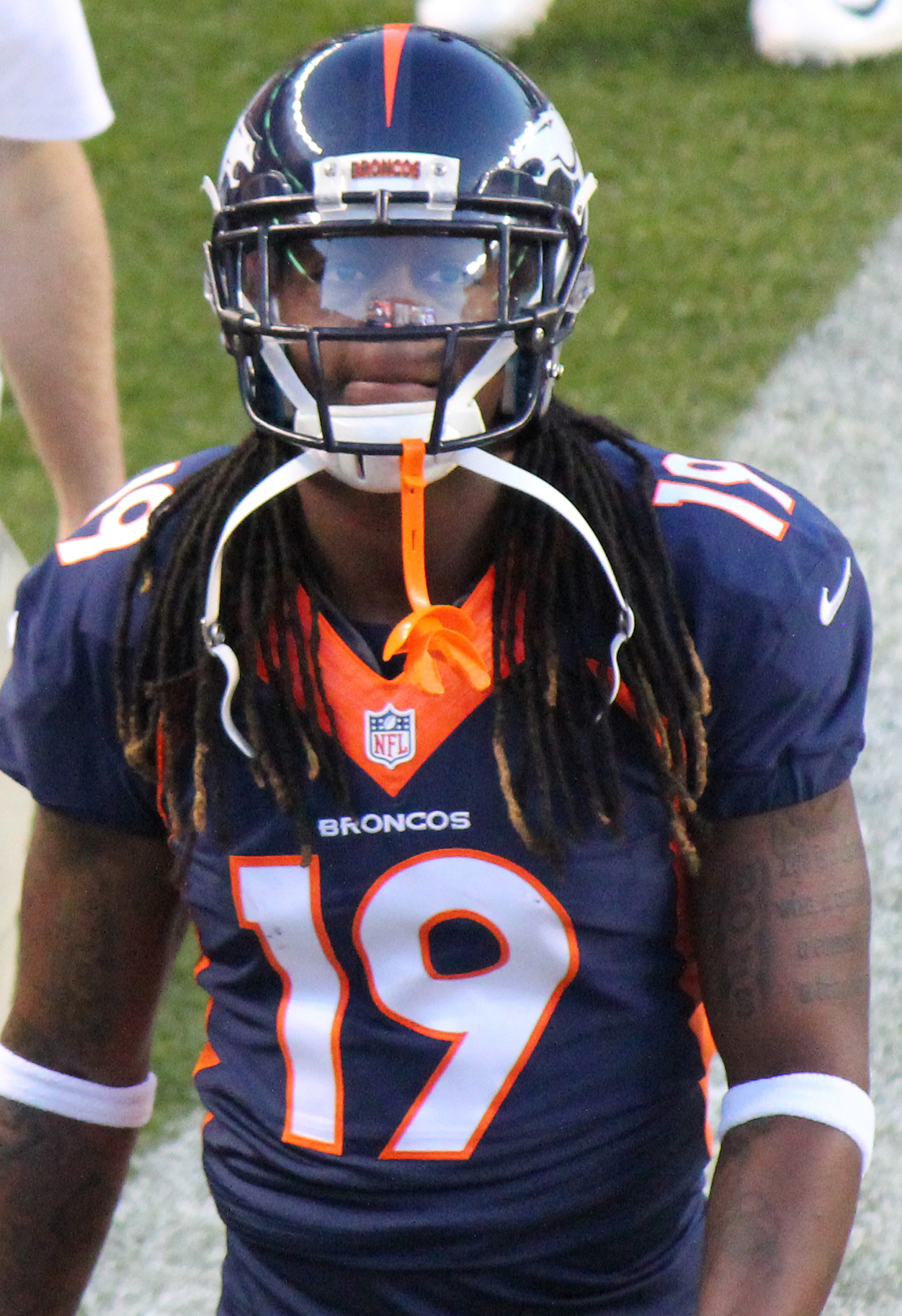
- Burse with the Denver Broncos in 2014

No. 19, 89
- Position: Wide receiver

Personal information
- Born: December 8, 1991 (age 34); Modesto, California, U.S.
- Listed height: 5 ft 10 in (1.78 m)
- Listed weight: 187 lb (85 kg)

Career information
- High school: Modesto Christian School (Salida, California)
- College: Fresno State
- NFL draft: 2014: undrafted

Career history
- Denver Broncos (2014); Pittsburgh Steelers (2015)*; San Diego / Los Angeles Chargers (2015–2017); San Diego Fleet (2019); Hamilton Tiger Cats (2020–2021)*
- * Offseason or practice squad member only

Career NFL statistics
- Return yards: 502
- Stats at Pro Football Reference

Isaiah Burse (born December 8, 1991) is an American former professional football player who was a wide receiver in the National Football League (NFL). He played college football for the Fresno State Bulldogs and was signed by the Denver Broncos as an undrafted free agent in 2014.

== Early life ==
From 2007 to 2009, Burse played for Modesto Christian High School in Modesto, California. He was the starting varsity quarterback for three seasons, and during his senior year, led the Modesto Christian Crusaders to the small school state championship. They defeated Parker, a San Diego high school, 44-40. The Crusaders finished the season with a perfect 15-0 record. Burse finished the season with 27 passing touchdowns, 26 rushing touchdowns, and was named MaxPreps Small School State Player of the Year. He was ranked a two star recruit by ESPN, and committed to play wide receiver at Fresno State.

== College career ==
Burse played college football at Fresno State University from 2010 to 2013. He finished his career with 210 receptions for 2,503 yards and 15 touchdowns.

== Professional career ==
=== Denver Broncos ===
Burse was signed by the Denver Broncos after going undrafted in the 2014 NFL draft. On December 6, 2014, the Broncos released him. On December 8, 2014, the Broncos re-signed Burse to their practice squad. On January 12, 2015, he signed a futures contract with the Chargers. He was waived on September 5, 2015.

=== Pittsburgh Steelers ===
On September 7, 2015, Burse was signed to the Steelers' practice squad. He was released by the Steelers on September 24, 2015.

=== San Diego / Los Angeles Chargers ===
On November 4, 2015, Burse was signed to the Chargers' practice squad. On January 4, 2016, he signed a futures contract with the Chargers. On September 20, 2016, he was released by the Chargers. Two days later he was signed to the practice squad. He was promoted to the active roster on October 29, 2016. He was released by the Chargers on October 31, 2016 and was signed to the practice squad two days later. He was promoted back to the active roster on November 5, 2016.

On September 2, 2017, Burse was waived/injured by the Chargers and placed on injured reserve.

=== San Diego Fleet ===
Burse signed with the San Diego Fleet of the Alliance of American Football for the inaugural 2019 season. He was waived/injured on January 10, 2019 during training camp, and was subsequently placed on injured reserve after clearing waivers. The league ceased operations in April 2019.

=== Hamilton Tiger-Cats ===
Burse signed with the Hamilton Tiger-Cats of the Canadian Football League on January 30, 2020. He was released on June 10, 2021.
