= Reeves Nelson =

American basketball player (born 1991)

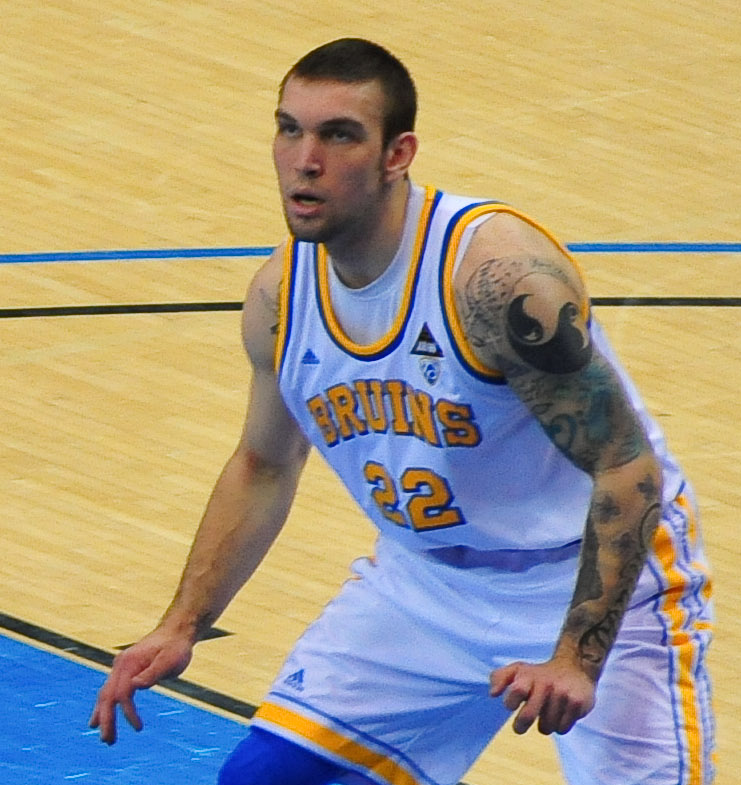
- Nelson with UCLA in 2011

Personal information
- Born: September 18, 1991 (age 35) Modesto, California, U.S.
- Listed height: 6 ft 8 in (2.03 m)
- Listed weight: 235 lb (107 kg)

Career information
- High school: Modesto Christian (Modesto, California)
- College: UCLA (2009–2011)
- NBA draft: 2012: undrafted
- Playing career: 2011–2015
- Position: Power forward

Career history
- 2011–2012: Žalgiris Kaunas
- 2013: Los Angeles D-Fenders
- 2013–2014: Delaware 87ers
- 2014: Fuerza Guinda de Nogales
- 2014: BC Kangoeroes
- 2015: Maccabi Raanana

Career highlights
- First-team All-Pac-10 (2011); Pac-10 All-Freshman team (2010)

Sophaur One (born Reeves Bruce Nelson, September 18, 1991) is an American former professional basketball player. He played college basketball for the UCLA Bruins from 2009 until 2011, when he was dismissed from the team.

Nelson played professionally for Žalgiris Kaunas in the Lithuanian Basketball League for five weeks before being released. He then declared for the 2012 NBA draft, but was not selected. Nelson then spent a pre-season with the Los Angeles Lakers before playing with the Los Angeles D-Fenders and Delaware 87ers in the NBA Development League (D-League). He also played in Mexico and Belgium.

== College career ==
Nelson signed to attend the University of California, Los Angeles (UCLA) after graduating from Modesto Christian High School in Modesto, California. He was called "the prototypical [UCLA coach] Ben Howland player" by ESPN.com. He joined the Bruins in 2009 as part of a five-player freshmen class that also included Tyler Honeycutt.

Nelson finished his sophomore season as the Bruins' top scorer (13.9) and rebounder (9.1) in 2010–11, and he was named first team All-Pac-10. In his junior year, he played six games of the 2011–12 season before he was suspended by coach Ben Howland for being late to a team meeting and behavior that was considered insubordinate. Howland reinstated him two days later, but Nelson later missed a team flight on November 19, 2011. He was suspended again on December 6, and finally dismissed from the team three days later.

In February 2012, a Sports Illustrated article portrayed Nelson as a bully on and off the court, who at times intentionally tried to injure his teammates. According to the article, Howland looked the other way and did not discipline Nelson for over two years. In May 2012, Nelson filed a defamation lawsuit against Time Inc., the parent company of Sports Illustrated, seeking $10 million in compensatory damages and $10 million in punitive damages, but it was thrown out of court in October 2012. The judge ruled that the suit interfered with freedom of speech rights of the magazine and writer, and the writer had a number of sources to corroborate the article.

== Professional career ==
On December 23, 2011, Nelson signed with Žalgiris Kaunas of Lithuania on a one-year deal (with the option of a second). On January 31, 2012, he was released by Zalgiris after just six games. In May 2012, he declared for the 2012 NBA draft.

After going undrafted in the 2012 NBA draft, Nelson joined the Los Angeles Lakers for the 2012 NBA Summer League. On September 5, 2012, he signed with the Lakers. However, he was later waived by the Lakers on October 20, 2012.

On March 29, 2013, Nelson was acquired by the Los Angeles D-Fenders.

On August 29, 2013, Nelson's rights were acquired by the Delaware 87ers in the 2013 NBA Development League Expansion Draft. On December 1, 2013, he officially joined the 87ers. On January 10, 2014, he was waived by the 87ers.

In April 2014, he joined Fuerza Guinda de Nogales of Mexico for the rest of the 2014 CIBACOPA season. He left next month after 15 games.

On June 24, 2014, he signed with Kangoeroes Basket Willebroek of Belgium for the 2014–15 season. On November 14, 2014, he was waived by the Kangoeroes after averaging 15.0 points and 6.3 rebounds in four games. On January 14, 2015, he signed with Maccabi Raanana in Israel, where he had a brief two-game stint. On February 24, he joined Panelefsiniakos B.C. in Greece. He was released from the team, without appearing in any games, after failing to perform adequately in training.

== Career statistics ==
College statistics

| Year | Team | GP | GS | MPG | FG% | 3P% | FT% | RPG | APG | SPG | BPG | PPG |
|---|---|---|---|---|---|---|---|---|---|---|---|---|
| 2009–10 | UCLA | 28 | 14 | 23.4 | .647 | — | .521 | 5.7 | .4 | .7 | .7 | 11.1 |
| 2010–11 | UCLA | 34 | 33 | 31.4 | .567 | .190 | .620 | 9.1 | 1.6 | .4 | .4 | 13.9 |
| 2011–12 | UCLA | 6 | 1 | 19.3 | .400 | .429 | .429 | 4.5 | 1.3 | .5 | .7 | 5.7 |
| Career | | 68 | 48 | 26.7 | .584 | .250 | .574 | 7.3 | 1.1 | .5 | .6 | 12.1 |

== Personal life ==
Reeves filed a motion with Los Angeles Superior Court Judge Mark Borenstein on January 25, 2016, to change his name to Sophaur One. On April 12, 2016, his request was approved.
