= Lazeric Jones =

American basketball player (born 1990)

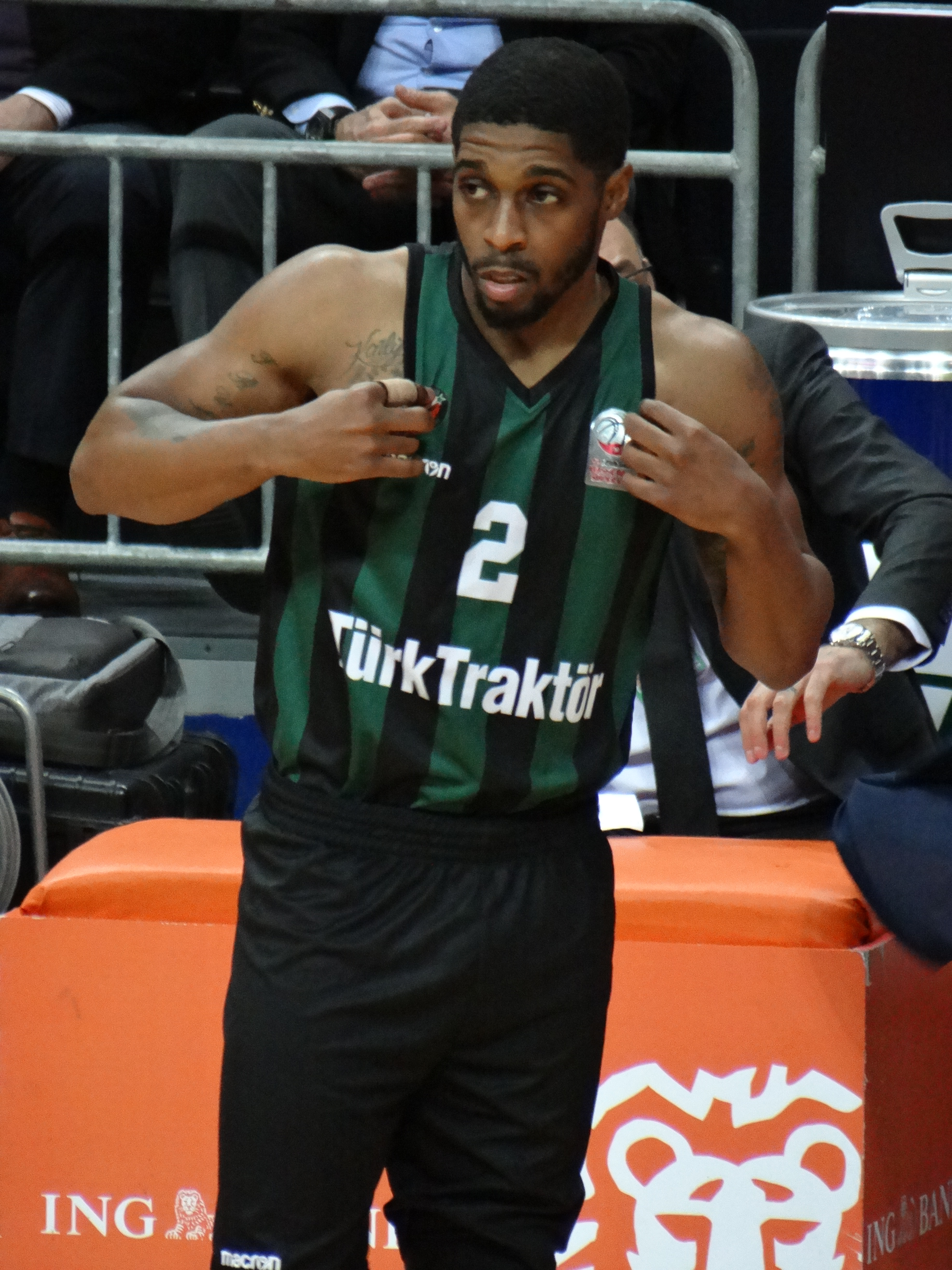
- Jones with Sakarya BB in 2018

Windy City Bulls
- Title: Player development coach
- League: NBA G League

Personal information
- Born: August 11, 1990 (age 36) Chicago, Illinois, U.S.
- Listed height: 6 ft 1 in (1.85 m)
- Listed weight: 185 lb (84 kg)

Career information
- High school: Simeon Career Academy (Chicago, Illinois)
- College: John A. Logan (2008–2010); UCLA (2010–2012)
- NBA draft: 2012: undrafted
- Playing career: 2012–2023
- Position: Point guard

Career history
- 2012–2013: Maccabi Rishon LeZion
- 2013–2014: KAOD
- 2014–2015: Szolnoki Olaj
- 2015–2016: Iowa Energy
- 2016: Pınar Karşıyaka
- 2016–2018: Sakarya BB
- 2018–2019: Monaco
- 2019–2020: Galatasaray Doğa Sigorta
- 2021: Medi Bayreuth
- 2021: Nizhny Novgorod
- 2022: ESSM Le Portel
- 2022–2023: Windy City Bulls

Career highlights
- Hungarian League champion (2015); Hungarian Cup champion (2015); Second-team All-Pac-12 (2012)
- Stats at Basketball Reference

Lazeric Deleon Jones (born August 11, 1990) is an American former professional basketball player who works as a player development coach for the Windy City Bulls of the NBA G League. He played college basketball for the UCLA Bruins, and was named a second-team all-conference player in the Pac-12 in 2012. Jones has also played professionally with the NBA G League as well as overseas in Israel, Greece, Hungary.

== Early life ==
Jones was born in Chicago, Illinois. He attended high school in Chicago at Simeon Career Academy, where he played behind future NBA Most Valuable Player Derrick Rose.

== College career ==
Jones went to junior college at John A. Logan College, and he led their basketball team to a Great Rivers Athletic Conference championship during his sophomore year in 2010. He transferred to the University of California, Los Angeles (UCLA) in 2010, when he became just the third junior college transfer in 30 years to play for the Bruins basketball program. He averaged 9.1 points and 3.7 assists in 2010–11; however, his performance dropped after a wrist injury in February. Still, he did not miss any games, and he was the only Bruin to start all 34 games.

During the offseason, he underwent a 10-week rehab program and returned to 100 percent by preseason practice the following season. In 2011–12, he was named team captain, and earned second-team All-Pac-12 honors after averaging a team-leading 13.5 points along with 4.1 assists and 3.5 rebounds per game.

== Professional career ==
After going undrafted in the 2012 NBA draft, Jones joined the Sacramento Kings for the 2012 NBA Summer League. He later signed with Maccabi Rishon LeZion of Israel for the 2012–13 season. In 26 games for Maccabi, he averaged 10.4 points, 2.4 rebounds, 2.9 assists and 1.3 steals per game.

In September 2013, Jones signed with KAOD of Greece for the 2013–14 season. In 28 games for KAOD, he averaged 13.6 points, 2.9 rebounds, 2.6 assists and 1.3 steals per game.

In July 2014, Jones joined the Chicago Bulls for the 2014 NBA Summer League. On September 10, 2014, he signed with Szolnoki Olaj of Hungary for the 2014–15 season. In 31 Adriatic/Eurocup games for Szolnoki, he averaged 13.3 points, 2.6 rebounds and 3.9 assists per game.

In July 2015, Jones joined the New Orleans Pelicans for the 2015 NBA Summer League. He signed with the Memphis Grizzlies on September 28, but was waived by the team on October 24 after appearing in six preseason games. On October 31, he was acquired by the Iowa Energy (known now as the Iowa Wolves) of the NBA D-League (now NBA G League) as an affiliate player of the Grizzlies. On January 22, 2016, Jones left Iowa after receiving a buyout. Three days later, he signed with Turkish team Pınar Karşıyaka for the rest of the season.

On November 23, 2016, Jones signed with the Turkish club Sakarya. He averaged 12 points and 3.7 assists per game during the 2017–18 season. On September 18, 2018, Jones signed with AS Monaco Basket of the French league.

On September 12, 2019, he has signed with Galatasaray Doğa Sigorta of the Basketbol Süper Ligi.

On January 11, 2021, he has signed with Medi Bayreuth of the Basketball Bundesliga. Jones averaged 6.6 points, 2.5 assists, and 1.2 rebounds per game. On September 23, 2021, he signed with Nizhny Novgorod of the VTB United League. Jones averaged 8.3 points, 5.0 assists and 2.0 rebounds per game. On January 1, 2022, he signed with ESSM Le Portel of the LNB Pro A.

=== Windy City Bulls (2022–2023) ===
On December 14, 2022, Jones signed a contract to join the Windy City Bulls.

== Coaching career ==
On October 22, 2024, Jones was hired by the Windy City Bulls to be a player development coach.

== Career statistics ==
College statistics

| Year | Team | GP | GS | MPG | FG% | 3P% | FT% | RPG | APG | SPG | BPG | PPG |
|---|---|---|---|---|---|---|---|---|---|---|---|---|
| 2010–11 | UCLA | 34 | 33 | 28.4 | .386 | .352 | .810 | 2.1 | 3.6 | 1.0 | .4 | 9.1 |
| 2011–12 | UCLA | 32 | 32 | 33.4 | .437 | .393 | .739 | 3.5 | 4.1 | 1.8 | .2 | 13.6 |
| Career | | 66 | 65 | 30.8 | .415 | .374 | .769 | 2.8 | 3.9 | 1.4 | .3 | 11.3 |
