= John W. North High School =

Coordinates: 33°58′55″N 117°20′45″W

- 1550 3rd St. Riverside, California 92507; California; USA

Information
- Type: Public
- Established: 1965
- Superintendent: Sonia Llamas
- Principal: Jodi Gonzales
- Teaching staff: 91.89 (FTE)
- Enrollment: 2,089 (2023–2024)
- Student to teacher ratio: 22.73
- Colors: Blue; Gold
- Athletics conference: CIF Southern Section; Inland Valley League
- Mascot: Husky
- Nickname: Huskies
- Rival: Riverside Poly
- Newspaper: The North Star
- Yearbook: Aurora
- Feeder schools: University Heights Middle School, Central Middle School
- Website: north.riversideunified.org

John W. North High School is a public high school in Riverside, California, part of the Riverside Unified School District, and the home of the Huskies. It is an International Baccalaureate school.

== History ==
John Wesley North High School was established in 1965 and named after the founder of Riverside, John W. North. In 2010, the California Court of Appeals Fourth District, Division 2 visited the school in an educational experience and as an outreach to young people. The Court heard two appeals in the school's theater.

In October 2021, a video went viral the footage displayed showed the math teacher Candice Reed at John W. North High School in Riverside Unified School District wearing a fake feather headdress while dancing around the classroom and chanting "SOH-CAH-TOA", which is a mnemonic for remembering a trigonometry principle. She was suspended.

== Demographics ==
North High School has a diverse student body: 10.6% Caucasian, 71.1% Latino, 11.1% black, and 4.6% Asian. Many second languages are also spoken here, including Spanish, Korean, Chinese, Tagalog, and Urdu. Average class size is 30+ students.

== Academics ==
In the 2005 Academic Performance Index (API) Statewide Rank, on a scale of 1 to 10, North ranked at 7. The same year, in the API Similar Schools Rank, North ranked at 10. As of 2010, the school is rated 7 out of 10 overall.

=== International Baccalaureate ===
In 1987, John W. North High School became the nineteenth California high school admitted into the International Baccalaureate (IB) program. North High is one of the few schools in California that awards the International Baccalaureate (IB) Diploma and Certificate to students.

== Extracurricular activities ==
North is home to many clubs and activities. This includes the Advancement Via Individual Determination (AVID) program which is designed to help motivate financially disadvantaged kids into college. North also has a number of academies: the Education and Human Services Academy, the Law and Protective Services Academy, and the Global Business Information and Technology Academy. It is also home to the Blue Star Regiment (BSR), North's award-winning marching band and auxiliary team.

North's award-winning yearbook, the Aurora, received the National Yearbook Pacemaker Award in 2005, the highest honor given to a high school yearbook by NSPA. They won tenth place at the Spring 2008 JEA Conference in Anaheim. Also, North's newspaper, The North Star, has won numerous national awards for the quality of its competitive issues and website. The North Star won third place in the 2017 Fall JEA/NSPA conference and won sixth place in 2019.

The school's Mock Trial has won first place in Riverside County in 1986, 1989, and 2000. The North Mock Trial team won second place in the 2000 California State Mock Trial competition.

=== Track and field ===
John W. North's Track and Field Team has won more CIF and state titles than any other school in the Inland Empire.

The program took off when Charles Leathers, a former hurdler himself, became the head coach in the early 1990s. In 1995 Joanna Hayes graduated from North with school records in the 100m and 300m Hurdles with times of 13.45 and 41.20. She came back from the CIF California State Meet with gold as well as running with the 4 × 100 m and 4 × 400 m teams with state winning teams of 47.18 and 3:46.16. She would later become the 2004 Olympic Gold Medal Winner in Athens in the 100m Hurdles and credits his coaching to the root of her success. Another prolific runner under Leathers was Nicole Hoxie. A sophomore during Hayes' last year, Hoxie would go on to finish the 1997 State Meet with the fastest women's time in the 100m hurdles, an incredible time of 13.35, and become a two-time champion. She also won gold with her 4 × 400 m team and a 300m hurdles time of 42.66. Hoxie went on to run successfully for the Texas Longhorns. The arrival of Nichole Denby also helped North's women's team. As a hurdler, Denby set more records: a school record of 13.20 seconds for 100m hurdles in 2000 and a best time of 41.53 in the 300m. Other women athletes at North included Keiana Shannon, April Holliverse, Chaunte Howard, Ashlee Brown, Domenique Manning, Lorainne King, Tanika Ward, Gayle Hunter, Kiersten Kirkland, Frances Chase-Dunn, and Marjani Maldonado. Together they had 12 CIF titles and 4 State titles, including back-to-back wins in 2006 and 2007.

In 2006 the men's team won the boys' State title. In 2007, the 4 × 400 m team took second in the State final. At 41.12 seconds, North High holds the fastest 100m time in Riverside County. Gutierrez currently holds the 400m North record with 46.79 seconds. And, in 2009, Dante Holland broke the 800m school record running it in 1:53.42 and making it to State.

Under his tenure, Leathers coached both the boys' and girls' teams to back-to-back CIF championships, placing North among only seven schools to do so. Since these heady successes, Coach Leather's command of the Huskies has come to an end and the team's prestige has slowly faded. Most recently, Dante was the only participating member of the North High squad going to State.

== Notable alumni ==
- Chris Claiborne, NFL linebacker, University of Southern California Football
- Duane Clemons, NFL linebacker, University of California, Berkeley
- Alvin Davis, MLB baseball player, 1984 American League Rookie of the Year
- Dan Dotson, star of Storage Wars
- Natalie Duran, star of American Ninja Warrior
- Danny Garcia, former MLB baseball player, New York Mets
- Mike Garcia, former MLB baseball player, Pittsburgh Pirates
- Ed Gray, NBA basketball player, Atlanta Hawks
- Joanna Hayes, Olympic track-and-field gold medalist
- Chaunte Howard, current American record holder in the high jump
- Solomon Hughes, actor (Winning Time:The Rise of the Lakers Dynasty )
- Adam Kennedy, MLB baseball player, Los Angeles Dodgers, Angels and others
- Christian Koss, MLB baseball player, San Francisco Giants
- J.F. Lawton, screenwriter, with credits including Pretty Woman
- Malcolm Lee, NBA basketball player, drafted by Minnesota
- Chaunte Lowe, high jumper, world champion, Olympic medalist
- Aaron Peck (American football), NFL tight end, Fresno State Football
- Clayton Sandell, ABC News correspondent
- Marcus Slaughter, basketball player, undrafted free agent
- Susan Straight, writer and novelist, Professor at the University of California, Riverside
- Deshon Taylor (born 1996), basketball player for Hapoel Haifa of the Israeli Basketball Premier League
