= Moscow basketball derby =

Russian professional basketball games

Moscow Basketball Derby
- Other names: Moscow Derby
- Location: Moscow
- Teams: Khimki Moscow Region; CSKA Moscow
- First meeting: 2005
- Latest meeting: November 11, 2020, Khimki wins
- Stadiums: Khimki Basketball Center; Universal Sports Hall CSKA

Statistics
- Total meetings: 116
- Most wins: CSKA Moscow (94)

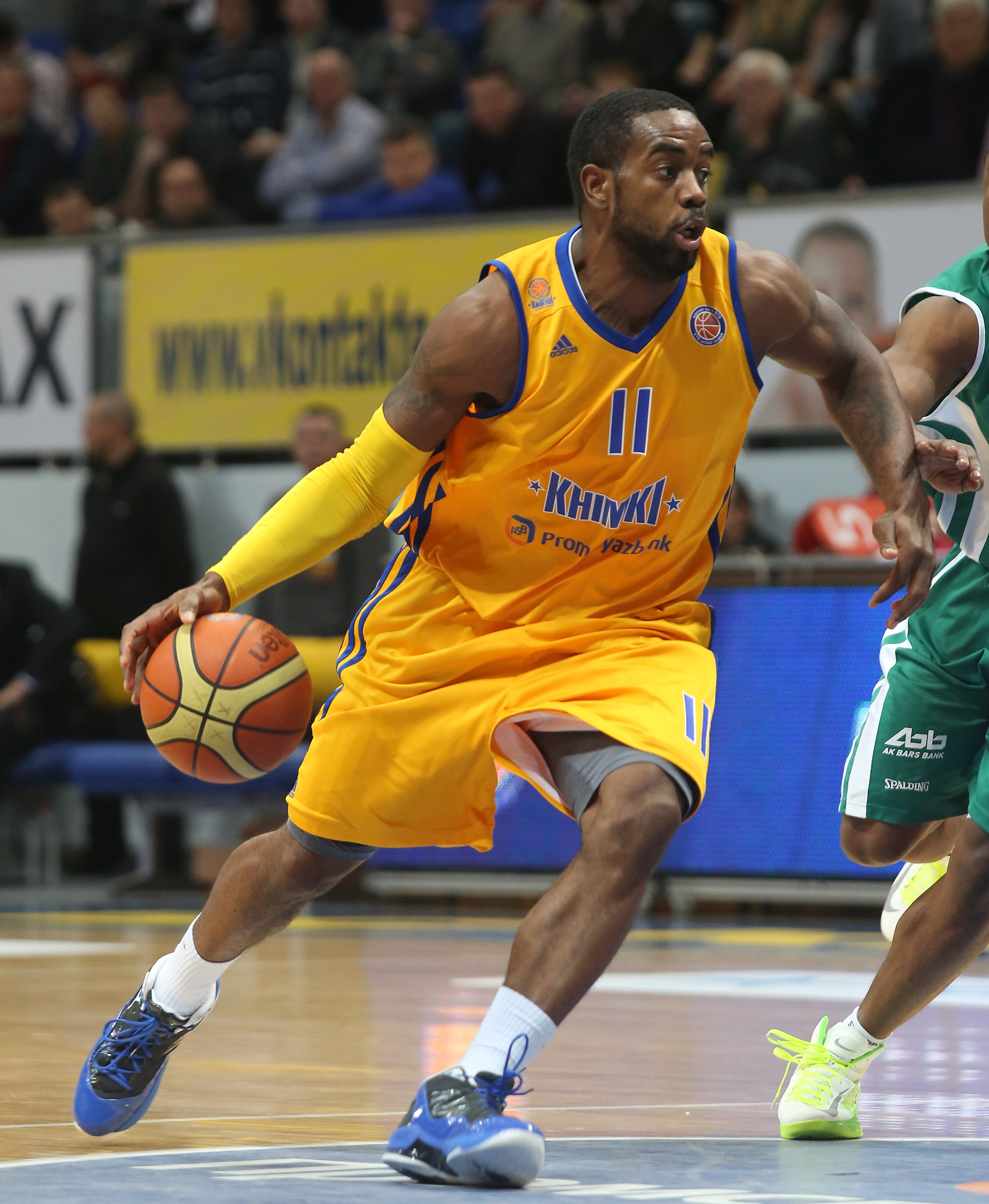
Former Khimki player K. C. Rivers

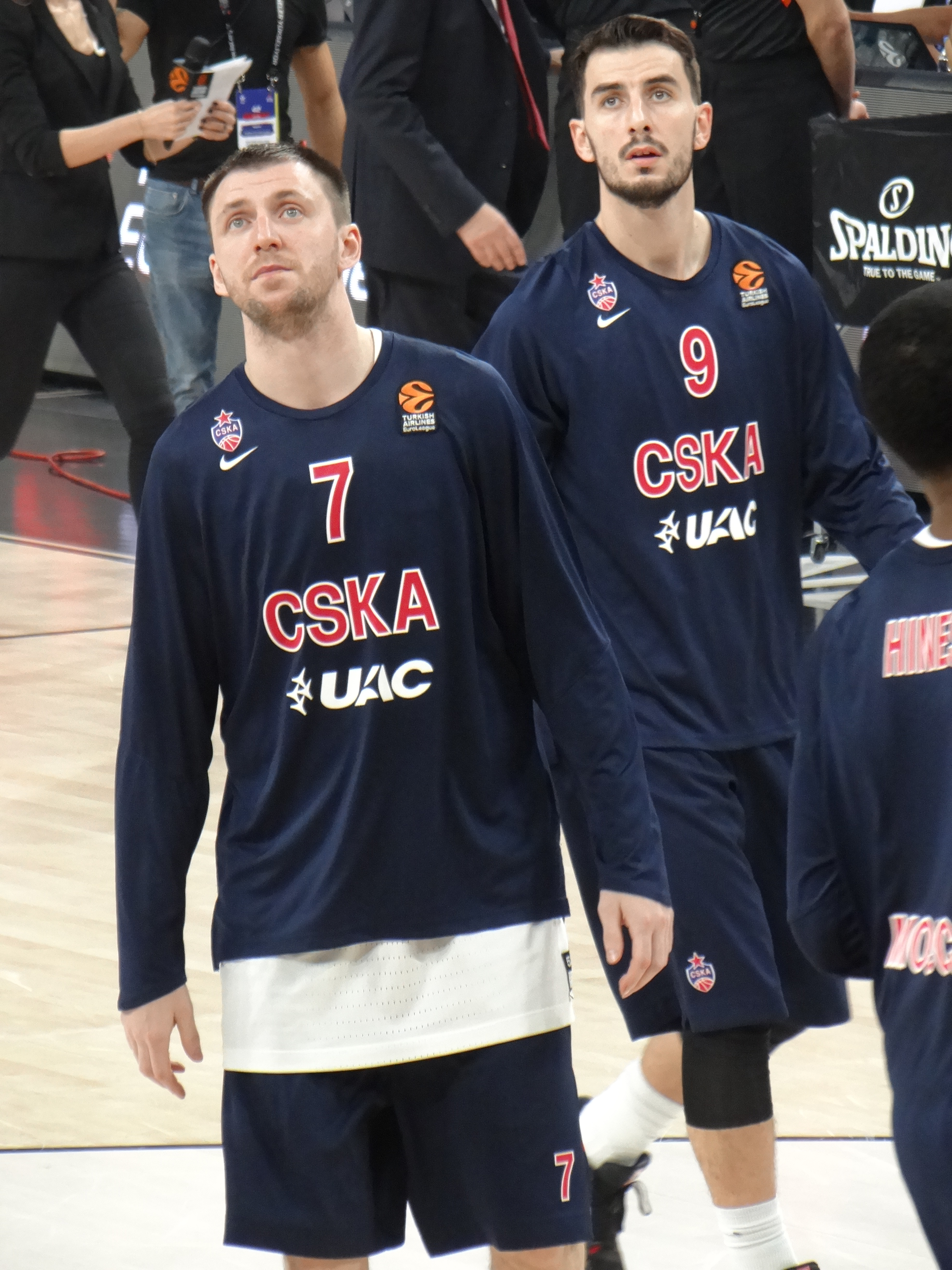
CSKA players Vitaly Fridzon and Léo Westermann

Moscow Basketball Derby is the name given to professional basketball games between CSKA Moscow of Moscow, and Khimki Moscow Region, from Khimki in Moscow Oblast. (Note: Баскетбольное дерби «ЦСКА» — «Химки») (Note: Никита Курбанов: "Матчи ЦСКА и "Химок" стали настоящим дерби") (Note: CSKA and Khimki will play in the Russian Euroleague derby) (Note: Главное противостояние российского баскетбола, Match TV) (Note: Димитрис Итудис: «Химки» остаются главным соперником ЦСКА в России)

It is considered to be the biggest rivalry in Russian basketball. (Note: ЦСКА уничтожает «Химки») (Note: ЦСКА победил «Химки» в главном дерби российского баскетбола) Until 2016, there was also a third Moscow-based basketball club, Dynamo Moscow, which had an even bigger local derby with CSKA, as the two teams were from Moscow city itself. However, the Dynamo Moscow club folded in 2016.

== Head-to-head statistics ==
| Competition | GP | CSKA | Khimki |
|---|---|---|---|
| Russian Championship | 47 | 38 | 9 |
| VTB United League | 26 | 20 | 6 |
| Russian Cup | 4 | 3 | 1 |
| EuroLeague (Note: ЦСКА против «Химок» – в битве за «Финал четырех». Это хорошо или плохо?) (Note: יורוליג: צסק"א מוסקבה הביסה 73:90 את חימקי מוסקבה) (Note: צסק"א מוסקבה תפגוש את חימקי לדרבי מסקרן) (Note: יורוליג: צסק"א מוסקבה ניצחה 68:79 את חימקי למרות משחק חלש של כוכביה) (Note: История противостояний. ЦСКА – Химки) (Note: Баскетбольное дерби «ЦСКА» — «Химки») (Note: Дерби Европейского Уровня: Химки против ЦСКА) | 4 | 3 | 1 |
| Total in all games | 91 | 64 | 20 |

Updated as of 6 January 2020

=== Titles comparison ===
| | Khimki Moscow | CSKA Moscow |
|---|---|---|
| Russian Championship | 0 | 26 |
| Russian Cup | 1 | 4 |
| Gomelsky Cup | 1 | 7 |
| VTB League | 1 | 9 |
| EuroCup | 2 | 0 |
| EuroLeague | 0 | 8 |
| Overall | 5 | 53 |
