= Malcolm Lee (basketball) =

American basketball player (born 1990)

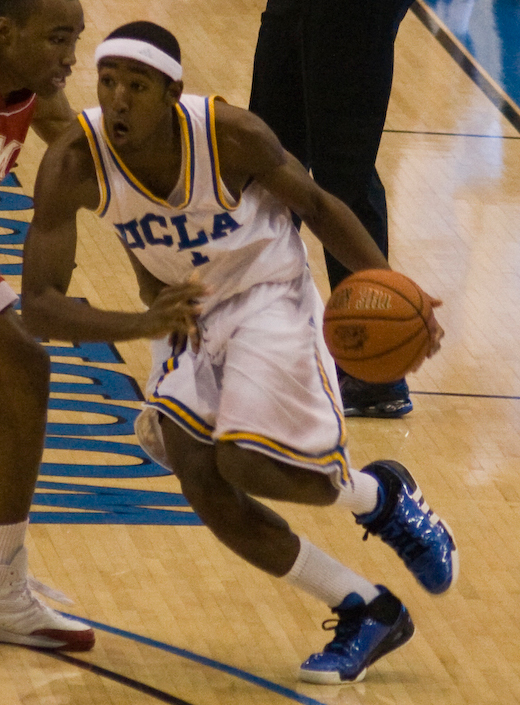
- Lee playing for UCLA

Personal information
- Born: May 22, 1990 (age 36) Riverside, California, U.S.
- Listed height: 6 ft 5 in (1.96 m)
- Listed weight: 200 lb (91 kg)

Career information
- High school: John W. North (Riverside, California)
- College: UCLA (2008–2011)
- NBA draft: 2011: 2nd round, 43rd overall pick
- Drafted by: Chicago Bulls
- Playing career: 2011–2022
- Position: Shooting guard / small forward
- Number: 3, 8, 30, 1, 11

Career history
- 2011–2013: Minnesota Timberwolves
- 2012: →Sioux Falls Skyforce
- 2014: Delaware 87ers
- 2014: Philadelphia 76ers
- 2014–2015: Delaware 87ers
- 2015: Grand Rapids Drive
- 2016: Brujos de Guayama
- 2016–2017: Trabzonspor
- 2017–2018: Igokea
- 2018–2019: Tigers Tübingen
- 2019: Kolossos Rodou
- 2019–2020: Rethymno Cretan Kings
- 2020–2022: CSO Voluntari

Career highlights
- 2× Romanian Cup winner (2021, 2022); Mirza Delibašić Cup winner (2018); First-team All-Pac-10 (2011); Fourth-team Parade All-American (2008); McDonald's All-American (2008)
- Stats at NBA.com
- Stats at Basketball Reference
Medals
Men's basketball
Representing United States
FIBA Americas U-18 Championship
Silver medal – second place	2008 Argentina	Team

Malcolm Toshio Lee (born May 22, 1990) is a former American professional basketball player who last played for the CSO Voluntari of the Liga Națională. As a college basketball player with the UCLA Bruins, he received all-conference honors in the Pacific-10 (later known as the Pac-12). After his junior year, he was selected in the second round of the 2011 NBA draft, and began his professional career with the Minnesota Timberwolves.

== Early years ==
Lee was born in Riverside, California, to Toshio and Delma Lee. He attended John W. North High School in Riverside.

Considered a four-star recruit by Rivals.com, Lee was listed as the No. 5 shooting guard and the No. 47 player in the nation in 2008.

Lee was named to the All-Pac-10 first team and Pac-10 All-Defensive team in his junior year at UCLA in 2011. He declared for the NBA draft after the season against the advice of UCLA coach Ben Howland. ESPN, Fox Sports, and Yahoo also questioned Lee's decision.

== Professional career ==
Lee was drafted in the second round of the 2011 NBA draft with the 43rd overall pick by the Chicago Bulls. He was traded on draft night to the Minnesota Timberwolves along with the draft rights to Norris Cole, the 28th pick, for the draft rights to Nikola Mirotić, the 23rd pick.

Lee signed a three-year guaranteed contract with the Timberwolves, rare for a second round pick. After his knee grew sore during training camp, Lee missed the beginning of the 2011–12 season after undergoing surgery to repair a torn meniscus in his left knee. On February 6, 2012, he was assigned to the Sioux Falls Skyforce in the NBA Development League to rehabilitate his knee, and he was recalled after playing three games. He was reassigned to Sioux Falls on February 29. He made his NBA regular season debut on March 10, 2012.

In 2012–13, Lee missed the majority of training camp and the exhibition season with an injured groin. He started 12 games during the regular season, including a career-high 10 points on December 4, 2012, in a win at Philadelphia. He became slowed by injuries, missing the remainder of the season after two surgeries in January: one hip surgery and another to repair damaged cartilage in his right knee.

On June 27, 2013, the day of the 2013 NBA draft, Lee was traded to the Golden State Warriors, who subsequently traded him to the Phoenix Suns. He spent the summer in Phoenix rehabilitating, but a less than full-strength right quadriceps prevented him from being cleared for full work. He was traded again on October 25, 2013, along with Marcin Gortat, Shannon Brown, and Kendall Marshall, to the Washington Wizards in exchange for Emeka Okafor and a 2014 lottery protected first round draft pick. Lee, Brown, and Marshall were all waived by the Wizards three days later.

On October 7, 2014, Lee signed with the Philadelphia 76ers. However, he was later waived by the 76ers on October 25, 2014. On November 3, 2014, he was acquired by the Delaware 87ers as an affiliate player. On December 5, he re-signed with the 76ers. Six days later, he was waived by the 76ers when they acquired Andrei Kirilenko and Jorge Gutiérrez in a trade. On December 13, he returned to Delaware and played that same night against the Canton Charge. On January 30, 2015, Lee was traded to the Grand Rapids Drive for the returning player rights to Khalif Wyatt.

On February 8, 2016, he signed with Brujos de Guayama of the Puerto Rican League. In 19 games, he averaged 13.4 points per game.

On September 14, 2016, he signed with Trabzonspor Basketball of the Turkish League.

On November 1, 2017, Lee signed with Igokea for the rest of the 2017–18 season. On January 16, 2018, he left with Igokea, and signed with German club Tigers Tübingen for the rest of the 2017–18 BBL season.

On January 31, 2019, Lee moved to Greece and signed with Kolossos Rodou. On October 11, 2019, he signed with another Greek team, Rethymno Cretan Kings, for the 2019–2020 season, replacing Prince Williams. Lee averaged 5.7 points, 4.8 rebounds, and 2.2 assists per game. On August 16, 2020, he signed with CSO Voluntari of the Liga Națională. After averaging 10.2 points, 4.2 rebounds, and 2.3 assists per game, Lee re-signed with the team on June 27, 2021.

== Career statistics ==
=== NBA statistics ===
Legend
GP	Games played	GS	Games started	MPG	Minutes per game
FG%	Field goal percentage	3P%	3-point field goal percentage	FT%	Free throw percentage
RPG	Rebounds per game	APG	Assists per game	SPG	Steals per game
BPG	Blocks per game	PPG	Points per game	**Bold**	Career high

==== Regular season ====
Year	Team	GP	GS	MPG	FG%	3P%	FT%	RPG	APG	SPG	BPG	PPG
2011–12	Minnesota	**19**	0	12.8	**.390**	.200	**.824**	1.4	**1.6**	.4	.2	3.3
2012–13	Minnesota	16	**12**	**18.1**	.382	**.333**	.600	**2.4**	1.3	**.8**	**.4**	**4.9**
2014–15	Philadelphia	1	0	2.0	.000	.000	.000	.0	.0	.0	.0	.0
Career		36	12	14.8	.382	.294	.703	1.8	1.4	.6	.3	3.9

=== College statistics ===
Year	Team	GP	GS	MPG	FG%	3P%	FT%	RPG	APG	SPG	BPG	PPG
2008–09	UCLA	29	0	10.7	.500	.300	.417	1.5	.6	.5	.1	3.2
2009–10	UCLA	32	32	34.8	.432	.252	.706	4.4	3.1	1.1	.3	12.1
2010–11	UCLA	33	33	33.1	.437	.295	.778	3.1	2.0	.7	.2	13.1
Career		94	65	26.7	.441	.278	.717	3.0	2.0	.8	.2	9.7
