= Salida, California =

Salida
- Census-designated place
- Motto: Salida Welcomes You!
- Interactive map of Salida
- Location in California Location in the United States
- Coordinates: 37°42′36″N 121°5′21″W
- Country: United States
- State: California
- County: Stanislaus
- Railroad station: 1870

Area
  - Total: 2.220 sq mi (5.750 km^{2})
  - Land: 2.217 sq mi (5.742 km^{2})
  - Water: 0.0031 sq mi (0.008 km^{2}) 0.14%
- Elevation: 69 ft (21 m)

Population (2020)
  - Total: 13,886
  - Density: 6,263/sq mi (2,418/km^{2})
- Time zone: UTC-8 (Pacific (PST))
  - Summer (DST): UTC-7 (PDT)
- ZIP code: 95368
- Area code: 209
- FIPS code: 06-64210
- GNIS feature ID: 1659792

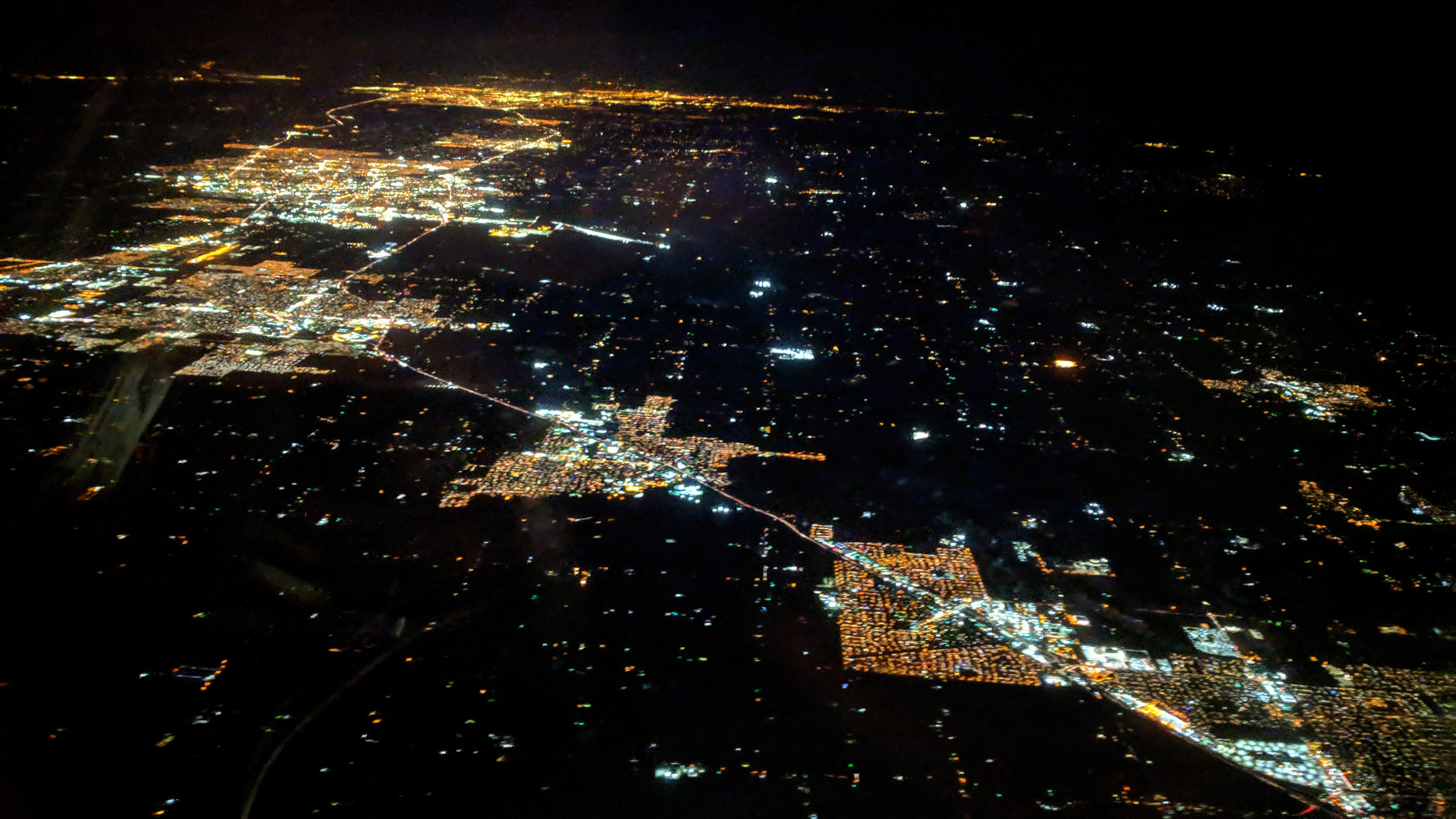
Night aerial looking north along California State Route 99. From bottom right, cities along the highway are Modesto, Salida, Ripon, Manteca, Stockton, Lodi, and Sacramento.

Salida (Spanish for "exit") is a census-designated place (CDP) in Stanislaus County, California, United States. As of the 2020 census, the CDP population was 13,886. It is part of the Modesto metropolitan area. Cultivation of almonds has historically been a significant activity in the vicinity, including a major Blue Diamond processing facility nearby. The plant is involved exclusively in processing whole brown almond kernels with a "dry" process involving no water, heat or chemicals. Salida is within the East Stanislaus Resource Conservation District, which comprises 984 square miles (2,550 km^{2}) of land area and attends to a variety of environmental conservation and best management agricultural practices.

== Etymology ==
Salida was given the Spanish name for "departure" by the Southern Pacific Railroad in 1870.

== History ==
In 1870, the Central Pacific Railroad extended its track construction to Stanislaus County's northern exit. There they established a railroad station with the Spanish name of salida, which in English means exit. This name favorably matched with modesto because both towns have Spanish meanings. They also laid the town out in the shape of a triangle. In 2012 and 2013, initial attempts to annex Salida to Modesto were studied, but were met with protests from local residents.

== Downtown ==
The Downtown of Salida is situated in the original town layout. Many government and commercial buildings line the sides of Broadway. In the center of Broadway are oak trees and a walking trail.

== Geography ==
Salida is located at 37°42′36″N 121°5′21″W (37.709877, -121.089286).

According to the United States Census Bureau, the CDP has a total area of 2.2 square miles (5.7 km^{2}) of which 99.86% is land and 0.14% is water.

== Demographics ==
Historical population
Census	Pop.	Note	%±
2000	18,070		—
2010	13,722		−24.1%
2020	13,886		1.2%
U.S. Decennial Census

=== 2020 census ===
As of the 2020 census, Salida had a population of 13,886 and a population density of 6,263.4 inhabitants per square mile (2,418.3/km^{2}). The median age was 34.4 years. The age distribution was 27.4% under the age of 18, 10.3% aged 18 to 24, 26.1% aged 25 to 44, 25.6% aged 45 to 64, and 10.6% aged 65 or older. For every 100 females, there were 99.8 males, and for every 100 females age 18 and over there were 99.2 males age 18 and over.

100.0% of residents lived in urban areas, while 0.0% lived in rural areas. The census reported that 99.4% of the population lived in households, 0.6% lived in non-institutionalized group quarters, and no one was institutionalized.

There were 3,995 households, of which 45.3% had children under the age of 18 living in them. Of all households, 61.4% were married-couple households, 6.4% were cohabiting-couple households, 14.7% were households with a male householder and no spouse or partner present, and 17.5% were households with a female householder and no spouse or partner present. About 11.9% of all households were made up of individuals and 5.7% had someone living alone who was 65 years of age or older. The average household size was 3.46, and there were 3,349 families (83.8% of all households).

There were 4,065 housing units at an average density of 1,833.6 units per square mile (708.0 units/km^{2}), of which 1.7% were vacant. The homeowner vacancy rate was 0.2% and the rental vacancy rate was 2.0%. Of occupied housing units, 78.2% were owner-occupied and 21.8% were renter-occupied.

Racial composition as of the 2020 census
Race	Number	Percent
White	5,740	41.3%
Black or African American	367	2.6%
American Indian and Alaska Native	249	1.8%
Asian	745	5.4%
Native Hawaiian and Other Pacific Islander	144	1.0%
Some other race	4,118	29.7%
Two or more races	2,523	18.2%
Hispanic or Latino (of any race)	7,619	54.9%

=== Demographic estimates ===
In 2023, the US Census Bureau estimated that 21.8% of the population were foreign-born. Of all people aged 5 or older, 55.4% spoke only English at home, 35.5% spoke Spanish, 6.2% spoke other Indo-European languages, 2.9% spoke Asian or Pacific Islander languages, and 0.1% spoke other languages. Of those aged 25 or older, 80.7% were high school graduates and 18.5% had a bachelor's degree.

=== Income and poverty ===
The median household income in 2023 was $91,990, and the per capita income was $37,031. About 10.3% of families and 9.5% of the population were below the poverty line.

=== 2010 census ===
The 2010 United States census reported that Salida had a population of 13,722. The population density was 2,462.9 inhabitants per square mile (950.9/km^{2}). The racial makeup of Salida was 8,479 (61.8%) White, 435 (3.2%) African American, 111 (0.8%) Native American, 669 (4.9%) Asian, 83 (0.6%) Pacific Islander, 3,134 (22.8%) from other races, and 811 (5.9%) from two or more races. Hispanic or Latino people of any race were 6,426 persons (46.8%).

The Census reported that 13,649 people (99.5% of the population) lived in households, 73 (0.5%) lived in non-institutionalized group quarters, and 0 (0%) were institutionalized.

There were 3,933 households, out of which 2,134 (54.3%) had children under the age of 18 living in them, 2,570 (65.3%) were opposite-sex married couples living together, 494 (12.6%) had a female householder with no husband present, 289 (7.3%) had a male householder with no wife present. There were 243 (6.2%) unmarried opposite-sex partnerships, and 14 (0.4%) same-sex married couples or partnerships. 427 households (10.9%) were made up of individuals, and 103 (2.6%) had someone living alone who was 65 years of age or older. The average household size was 3.47. There were 3,353 families (85.3% of all households); the average family size was 3.72.

The population was spread out, with 4,396 people (32.0%) under the age of 18, 1,349 people (9.8%) aged 18 to 24, 4,003 people (29.2%) aged 25 to 44, 3,113 people (22.7%) aged 45 to 64, and 861 people (6.3%) who were 65 years of age or older. The median age was 31.2 years. For every 100 females, there were 102.6 males. For every 100 females age 18 and over, there were 100.5 males.

There were 4,204 housing units at an average density of 754.6 units per square mile (291.4 units/km^{2}), of which 3,076 (78.2%) were owner-occupied, and 857 (21.8%) were occupied by renters. The homeowner vacancy rate was 2.8%; the rental vacancy rate was 6.0%. 10,395 people (75.8% of the population) lived in owner-occupied housing units and 3,254 people (23.7%) lived in rental housing units.

== Schools ==
Salida Union Elementary School District serves the Salida area, operating four TK-6 elementary schools and one middle school (grades 6-8). The school district also authorizes Great Valley Academy - Salida, a public charter school. Including the charter school, district enrollment was 2,990 students as of 2024.

High school students are served by the Modesto City Schools district, which includes Joseph Gregori High School adjacent to Salida.

=== Elementary schools ===
- Dena Boer Elementary
- Mildred Perkins Elementary
- Salida Elementary
- Sisk Elementary

=== Middle school ===
- Salida Middle School

== Government ==
In the California State Legislature, Salida is in the 4th senatorial district, represented by Republican Marie Alvarado-Gil, and in the 9th Assembly district, represented by Republican Heath Flora.

In the United States House of Representatives, Salida is in California's 5th congressional district, represented by Republican Tom McClintock.

Salida is governed by the Stanislaus County Board of Supervisors in District 3.

== Politics ==
According to Salida resident, Lee Sell, there was a movement to incorporate Salida as a city during the 1950s but it failed due to lack of tax base. Incorporation discussion surfaced again in 2007.

In 1996, the City of Modesto sought to annex Salida and Wood Colony's "Beckwith Triangle" which was voted down by LAFCO. At an August 2013 Modesto Planning Commission workshop, Modesto city planners unveiled a new general plan update to annex Salida and doubled the size of land they wanted to annex in and around the Beckwith Triangle.

Terry Withrow, Stanislaus County Supervisor whose district covers Salida, authored an opinion piece which appeared in the Modesto Bee on August 20, 2011, in favor of annexing Salida to the City of Modesto. After being elected in a run-off, Modesto Mayor Garrad Marsh expressed his support of annexing Salida in his "State of the City" speech in March 2012. Both politicians met with a contentious crowd of over 200 residents who filled the Salida Municipal Advisory Council meeting room on January 29, 2013. The majority of residents spoke against annexation.

With the election of the new Modesto Mayor, Ted Brandvold, along with several new city council members, 2016 saw a "reset" to Modesto's 1995 General Plan boundaries. The 1995 General Plan includes Salida and the Beckwith Triangle area of Wood Colony, leaving the two unincorporated communities still susceptible to annexation by the City of Modesto.

== Notable residents ==
- Frank Chance, member of Baseball Hall of Fame, born in Salida
- Gregory Rayl, NASCAR driver and crew chief
- Eddie "Piolín" Sotelo, radio broadcaster
- Spice 1, rapper
- Claude Terry, professional basketball player
