= 2013–14 Oklahoma Sooners men's basketball team =

American college basketball season

2013–14 Oklahoma Sooners men's basketball

NCAA tournament, round of 64
- Conference: Big 12

Ranking
- AP: No. 21
- Record: 23–10 (12–6 Big 12)
- Head coach: Lon Kruger (3rd season)
- Assistant coaches: Steve Henson; Lew Hill; Chris Crutchfield
- Home arena: Lloyd Noble Center

2013–14 Big 12 men's basketball standings
	Conf.				Overall
Team	W		L	PCT	W		L	PCT
No. 10 Kansas	14	–	4	.778	25	–	10	.714
No. 21 Oklahoma	12	–	6	.667	23	–	10	.697
Texas	11	–	7	.611	24	–	11	.686
No. 9 Iowa State †	11	–	7	.611	28	–	8	.778
Kansas State	10	–	8	.556	20	–	13	.606
West Virginia	9	–	9	.500	17	–	16	.515
No. 23 Baylor	9	–	9	.500	26	–	12	.684
Oklahoma State	8	–	10	.444	21	–	13	.618
Texas Tech	6	–	12	.333	14	–	18	.438
TCU	0	–	18	.000	9	–	22	.290
† 2014 Big 12 Tournament winner Rankings from AP poll

The 2013–14 Oklahoma Sooners basketball team represented the University of Oklahoma in the 2013–14 NCAA Division I men's basketball season. The Sooners were led by Lon Kruger in his third season. The team played its home games at the Lloyd Noble Center in Norman, Oklahoma as a member of the Big 12 Conference. They finished the season 23–10, 12–6 in Big 12 play to finish in second place. They lost in the quarterfinals of the Big 12 tournament to Baylor. They received an at-large bid to the NCAA tournament where they lost in the first round to North Dakota State

== Preseason ==
=== Departures ===
Name	Number	Pos.	Height	Weight	Year	Hometown	Notes
Sam Grooms	1	G	6'1"	203	Senior	Greensboro, North Carolina	Graduated
Steven Pledger	2	G	6'4"	224	Senior	Chesapeake, Virginia	Graduated
Andrew Fitzgerald	4	F	6'8"	236	Senior	Baltimore, Maryland	Graduated
Jarrod Kruger	12	F	6'1"	174	Sophomore	Topeka, Kansas	Left the team to focus on his studies
Steve Noworyta	14	F	6'7"	202	Freshman	Hainesport, New Jersey	Left the team
Amath M'Baye	22	F	6'9"	215	Junior	Bordeaux, France	Entered the 2013 NBA draft
Romero Osby	24	F	6'8"	238	Senior	Meridian, Mississippi	Graduated
Casey Arent	32	C	6'10"	229	Senior	Penryn, California	Graduated

=== Recruits ===
College recruiting
Name	Hometown	School	Height	Weight	Commit date
Edson Avila; F	Brooklyn, New York	Seward CC	6 ft 10 in (2.08 m)	225 lb (102 kg)	Apr 17, 2013
Edson Avila; F	Recruit ratings: Scout: Rivals: (JC)				
Frank Booker Jr. G	Augusta, Georgia	Westside	6 ft 4 in (1.93 m)	185 lb (84 kg)	Mar 21, 2013
Frank Booker Jr. G	Recruit ratings: Scout: Rivals: (70)				
Dominique Elliott; F	Savannah, Georgia	Westside	6 ft 8 in (2.03 m)	247 lb (112 kg)	Sep 12, 2012
Dominique Elliott; F	Recruit ratings: Scout: Rivals: (JC)				
Keshaun Hamilton; F	Parsons, Kansas	Labette CC	6 ft 10 in (2.08 m)	280 lb (130 kg)	Sep 25, 2012
Keshaun Hamilton; F	Recruit ratings: Scout: Rivals: (JC)				
Jordan Woodward; G	Edmond, Oklahoma	Edmond Memorial	6 ft 1 in (1.85 m)	170 lb (77 kg)	Aug 23, 2012
Jordan Woodward; G	Recruit ratings: Scout: Rivals: (76)				
Overall recruit ranking:
Note: In many cases, Scout, Rivals, 247Sports, On3, and ESPN may conflict in their listings of height and weight.; In these cases, the average was taken. ESPN grades are on a 100-point scale.; Sources: "Oklahoma 2013 Basketball Commitments". Rivals.; "2013 Oklahoma Basketball Commits". Scout.; "ESPN". ESPN.; "Scout.com Team Recruiting Rankings". Scout.; "2013 Team Ranking". Rivals.

== Roster ==
2013–14 Oklahoma Sooners men's basketball team
Players
Coaches

Pos.	#	Name	Height	Weight	Year	Previous school	Hometown
F	00	Ryan Spangler	6 ft 8 in (2.03 m)	230 lb (104 kg)	RS So	Bridge Creek; Gonzaga	Bridge Creek, OK
G	1	Frank Booker Jr.	6 ft 4 in (1.93 m)	201 lb (91 kg)	Fr	Westside	Augusta, GA
G	5	Je'lon Hornbeak	6 ft 4 in (1.93 m)	186 lb (84 kg)	So	Grace Prep	Arlington, TX
G	10	Jordan Woodard	6 ft 0 in (1.83 m)	185 lb (84 kg)	Fr	Edmond Memorial	Arcadia, OK
G	11	Isaiah Cousins	6 ft 4 in (1.93 m)	181 lb (82 kg)	So	Mount Vernon	Mount Vernon, NY
G	13	James Fraschilla	5 ft 10 in (1.78 m)	150 lb (68 kg)	Jr	Highland Park	Dallas, TX
F	15	Tyler Neal	6 ft 7 in (2.01 m)	231 lb (105 kg)	Sr	Putnam City West	Oklahoma City, OK
G	21	Cameron Clark	6 ft 7 in (2.01 m)	209 lb (95 kg)	Sr	Sherman	Sherman, TX
G	22	Daniel Harper	6 ft 1 in (1.85 m)	174 lb (79 kg)	RS Fr	Norman	Norman, OK
G	24	Buddy Hield	6 ft 3 in (1.91 m)	200 lb (91 kg)	So	Sunrise Christian Academy	Freeport, Bahamas
F	25	C. J. Cole	6 ft 7 in (2.01 m)	230 lb (104 kg)	RS Fr	Sperry	Sperry, OK
F	31	D. J. Bennett	6 ft 8 in (2.03 m)	202 lb (92 kg)	RS Jr	Indian Hills CC	Chicago, IL
F	41	Austin Mankin	6 ft 7 in (2.01 m)	200 lb (91 kg)	Fr	Coppell	Coppell, TX
G	45	Trey Slate	6 ft 1 in (1.85 m)	196 lb (89 kg)	Fr	Gore	Gore, OK

Head coach

- Lon Kruger (Kansas State

Assistant coach(es)

- Steve Henson (Kansas State)
- Lew Hill (Wichita State)
- Chris Crutchfield (Omaha)

Legend

- (C) Team captain
- (S) Suspended
- (I) Ineligible
- (W) Walk-on
- Injured
- Current redshirt

== Schedule ==
Date time, TV	Rank^{#}	Opponent^{#}	Result	Record	Site (attendance) city, state
Exhibition
11/02/2013*; 2:00 pm, x- SSTV		Washburn	W 104-76	–	Lloyd Noble Center (2,946); Norman, OK
11/04/2013*; 7:00 pm, SSTV		Oklahoma Christian	W 88–76	–	Lloyd Noble Center (2,703); Norman, OK
Non-conference Regular Season
11/08/2013*; 4:00 pm, SSTV		vs. Alabama	W 82–73	1–0	American Airlines Center (400); Dallas, TX
11/11/2013*; 7:00 pm, SSTV		North Texas; Coaches Vs. Cancer Classic	W 95-82	2-0	Lloyd Noble Center (9,288); Norman, OK
11/13/2013*; 7:00 pm, SSTV		Idaho; Coaches Vs. Cancer Classic	W 85–65	3–0	Lloyd Noble Center (9,445); Norman, OK
11/22/2013*; 6:00 pm, truTV		vs. Seton Hall; Coaches Vs. Cancer Classic	W 86-85	4–0	Barclays Center (6,115); Brooklyn, NY
11/23/2013*; 8:30 pm, truTV		vs. No. 1 Michigan State; Coaches Vs. Cancer Classic	L 76–87	4–1	Barclays Center (6,098); Brooklyn, NY
11/29/2013*; 2:00 pm, SSTV		Arkansas–Little Rock	W 101–81	5–1	Lloyd Noble Center (10,921); Norman, OK
12/02/2013*; 7:00 pm, ESPNU		Mercer	W 96–82	6–1	Lloyd Noble Center (9,363); Norman, OK
12/05/2013*; 7:00 pm, SSTV		Texas A&M–Corpus Christi	W 78–56	7–1	Lloyd Noble Center (2,300); Norman, OK
12/08/2013*; 12:00 pm, MASN		vs. George Mason; BB&T Classic	W 81–66	8–1	Verizon Center (N/A); Washington, D.C.
12/14/2013*; 4:00 pm, SSTV		Tulsa	W 101–91	9–1	Lloyd Noble Center (10,763); Norman, OK
12/17/2013*; 7:00 pm, SSTV		Texas–Arlington	W 91–89	10–1	Lloyd Noble Center (3,105); Norman, OK
12/21/2013*; 6:00 pm, ESPNU		vs. Texas A&M; Big 12/SEC Challenge	W 64–52	11–1	Toyota Center (N/A); Houston, TX
12/30/2013*; 7:00 pm, SSTV		Louisiana Tech	L 98–102 ^{OT}	11–2	Lloyd Noble Center (10,903); Norman, OK
Big 12 Regular Season
01/04/2014; 7:00 pm, LHN		at Texas	W 88-85	12–2 (1–0)	Frank Erwin Center (10,189); Austin, TX
01/08/2014; 6:00 pm, ESPN2		No. 18 Kansas	L 83–90	12–3 (1–1)	Lloyd Noble Center (13,127); Norman, OK
01/11/2014; 11:00 am, ESPNU		No. 9 Iowa State	W 87–82	13–3 (2–1)	Lloyd Noble Center (11,105); Norman, OK
01/14/2014; 6:00 pm, ESPN2	No. 25	at Kansas State	L 66–72	13–4 (2–2)	Bramlage Coliseum (12,250); Manhattan, KS
01/18/2014; 1:00 pm, ESPN	No. 25	at No. 12 Baylor	W 66–64	14–4 (3–2)	Ferrell Center (8,544); Waco, TX
01/22/2014; 8:00 pm, ESPNU	No. 25	TCU	W 77-69	15-4 (4-2)	Lloyd Noble Center (9,854); Norman, OK
01/25/2014; 3:00 pm, B12N	No. 25	at Texas Tech	W 74-65	16-4 (5-2)	United Spirit Arena (9,317); Lubbock, TX
01/27/2014; 8:00 pm, ESPN	No. 23	No. 8 Oklahoma State	W 88–76	17–4 (6–2)	Lloyd Noble Center (13,093); Norman, OK
02/01/2014; 3:00 pm, B12N	No. 23	at No. 16 Iowa State	L 75–81	17–5 (6–3)	Hilton Coliseum (14,384); Ames, IA
02/05/2014; 6:00 pm, ESPNU	No. 21	at West Virginia	L 86–91 ^{OT}	17–6 (6–4)	WVU Coliseum (7,538); Morgantown, WV
02/08/2014; 6:00 pm, ESPN2	No. 21	Baylor	W 88–72	18–6 (7–4)	Lloyd Noble Center (13,112); Norman, OK
02/12/2014; 7:00 pm, B12N		Texas Tech	L 60–68	18–7 (7–5)	Lloyd Noble Center (13,002); Norman, OK
02/15/2014; 1:00 pm, ESPN2		at Oklahoma State	W 77–74	19–7 (8–5)	Gallagher-Iba Arena (10,070); Stillwater, OK
02/22/2014; 3:00 pm, B12N		Kansas State	W 86–73	20–7 (9–5)	Lloyd Noble Center (12,925); Norman, OK
02/24/2014; 8:00 pm, ESPN		at No. 5 Kansas	L 75-83	20-8 (9-6)	Allen Fieldhouse (16,300); Lawrence, KS
03/01/2014; 3:00 pm, B12N		No. 24 Texas	W 77-65	21-8 (10-6)	Lloyd Noble Center (12,976); Norman, OK
03/05/2014; 8:00 pm, ESPNU	No. 23	West Virginia	W 72-62	22-8 (11-6)	Lloyd Noble Center (10,674); Norman, OK
03/08/2014; 3:00 pm, B12N	No. 23	at TCU	W 97–67	23–8 (12–6)	Daniel-Meyer Coliseum (4,878); Ft. Worth, TX
Big 12 Tournament
03/12/2014; 6:00 pm	No. 17	vs. Baylor; Quarterfinals	L 73–78	23–9	Sprint Center (18,972); Kansas City, MO
NCAA tournament
03/20/2014*; 6:27 pm, truTV	No. 21 (5 W)	vs. (12 W) North Dakota State; Second round	L 75-80 ^{OT}	23–10	Spokane Veterans Memorial Arena (10,962); Spokane, WA
*Non-conference game. ^{#}Rankings from AP Poll. (#) Tournament seedings in parentheses. All times are in Central Time. (#) during NCAA Tournament is seed within region W=West.

x- Sooner Sports Television (SSTV) is aired locally on Fox Sports. However the contract allows games to air on various affiliates. Those affiliates are FSSW, FSSW+, FSOK, FSOK+, and FCS Atlantic, Central, and Pacific.

== Rankings ==
Ranking movement Legend: ██ Increase in ranking. ██ Decrease in ranking. ██ Not ranked the previous week.
Poll	Pre	Wk 2	Wk 3	Wk 4	Wk 5	Wk 6	Wk 7	Wk 8	Wk 9	Wk 10	Wk 11	Wk 12	Wk 13	Wk 14	Wk 15	Wk 16	Wk 17	Wk 18	Wk 19	Wk 20	Final
AP	NR	NR	NR	NR	RV	RV	RV	RV	RV	RV	25	25	23	21	RV	RV	RV	23	17	21	*N/A
Coaches	NR	NR	NR	NR	NR	RV	RV	RV	RV	RV	RV	25т	25	23	25	RV	25	23	18	20	RV

*AP does not release post-tournament rankings

== See also ==
- 2013–14 Oklahoma Sooners women's basketball team
