= 2013–14 Kansas State Wildcats men's basketball team =

American college basketball season

2013–14 Kansas State Wildcats men's basketball

NCAA tournament, round of 64
- Conference: Big 12 Conference
- Record: 20–13 (10–8 Big 12)
- Head coach: Bruce Weber
- Assistant coaches: Chris Lowery; Alvin Brooks III; Chester Frazier
- Home arena: Bramlage Coliseum (12,528)

2013–14 Big 12 men's basketball standings
	Conf.				Overall
Team	W		L	PCT	W		L	PCT
No. 10 Kansas	14	–	4	.778	25	–	10	.714
No. 21 Oklahoma	12	–	6	.667	23	–	10	.697
Texas	11	–	7	.611	24	–	11	.686
No. 9 Iowa State †	11	–	7	.611	28	–	8	.778
Kansas State	10	–	8	.556	20	–	13	.606
West Virginia	9	–	9	.500	17	–	16	.515
No. 23 Baylor	9	–	9	.500	26	–	12	.684
Oklahoma State	8	–	10	.444	21	–	13	.618
Texas Tech	6	–	12	.333	14	–	18	.438
TCU	0	–	18	.000	9	–	22	.290
† 2014 Big 12 Tournament winner Rankings from AP poll

The 2013–14 Kansas State Wildcats men's basketball team represented Kansas State University in the 2013–14 NCAA Division I men's basketball season. The head coach was Bruce Weber, who was in his second year at the helm of the Wildcats. The team played its home games in Bramlage Coliseum in Manhattan, Kansas, its home court since 1988. Kansas State was a member of the Big 12 Conference. They finished the season 20–13, 10–8 in Big 12 play to finish in fifth place. They lost in the quarterfinals of the Big 12 tournament to Iowa State. They received an at-large bid to the NCAA tournament where they lost in the second round to Kentucky.

== Preseason ==
The team plays its home games at Bramlage Coliseum, which has a capacity of 12,528. They are in their 18th season as a member of the Big 12 Conference. Last season they finished with a record of 27–8 overall, 14–4 in Big 12 play and were Co-Champs of the Big 12 Conference with Kansas but lost in the Big 12 championship game against in-state rival Kansas and earn a trip to the 2013 NCAA Division I men's basketball tournament and were upset by La Salle in the round of 64.

=== Departures ===
Name	Number	Pos.	Height	Weight	Year	Hometown	Notes
Martavious Irving	3	G	6'1"	210	Senior	Fort Lauderdale, FL	Graduated
Angel Rodríguez	13	G	5'11"	180	Sophomore	Miami, FL	Transferred
Adrian Diaz	20	F	6'10"	225	Sophomore	Miami, FL	Transferred
Jordan Henriquez	21	F	6'11"	250	Senior	Port Chester, NY	Graduated
Rodney McGruder	22	G	6'4"	205	Senior	Washington, D.C.	Graduated

=== Class of 2013 recruits ===
College recruiting information
Name	Hometown	School	Height	Weight	Commit date
Wesley Iwundu; SF	Houston, TX	Westfield High School	6 ft 6 in (1.98 m)	200 lb (91 kg)	Sep 17, 2012
Wesley Iwundu; SF	Recruit ratings: Scout: Rivals: (78)				
Marcus Foster; SG	Wichita Falls, TX	Hirschi High School	6 ft 2 in (1.88 m)	185 lb (84 kg)	Sep 10, 2012
Marcus Foster; SG	Recruit ratings: Scout: Rivals: (75)				
Jevon Thomas; PG	Delafield, WI	St. John's Northwestern Military Academy	6 ft 1 in (1.85 m)	178 lb (81 kg)	Dec 20, 2012
Jevon Thomas; PG	Recruit ratings: Scout: Rivals: (POST)				
Nigel Johnson; PG	Upper Marlboro, MD	Riverdale Baptist School	6 ft 1 in (1.85 m)	170 lb (77 kg)	Apr 21, 2013
Nigel Johnson; PG	Recruit ratings: Scout: Rivals: (69)				
Neville Fincher; C	Teaneck, NJ	Hargrave Military Academy	6 ft 9 in (2.06 m)	220 lb (100 kg)	Apr 21, 2013
Neville Fincher; C	Recruit ratings: Scout: Rivals: (68)				
Jack Karapetyan; PF	Los Angeles, CA	Cathedral High School	6 ft 7 in (2.01 m)	215 lb (98 kg)	Jul 1, 2013
Jack Karapetyan; PF	Recruit ratings: Rivals: (NR)				
Overall recruit ranking: Scout: Not Ranked Top 20 Rivals: Not Ranked Top 25 ESPN: Not Ranked Top 25
Note: In many cases, Scout, Rivals, 247Sports, On3, and ESPN may conflict in their listings of height and weight.; In these cases, the average was taken. ESPN grades are on a 100-point scale.; Sources: "2013 Kansas State Basketball Commits". Rivals.; "2013 Kansas State Basketball Commits". Scout.; "2013 Kansas State Basketball Commits". ESPN.; "Scout.com Team Recruiting Rankings". Scout.; "2013 Team Ranking". Rivals.

== Schedule ==
Date time, TV	Rank^{#}	Opponent^{#}	Result	Record	Site (attendance) city, state
Exhibition
11/01/2013*; 8:00 pm, FSKC		Pittsburg State	W 75–54	–	Bramlage Coliseum (12,528); Manhattan, KS
Non-conference regular season
11/08/2013*; 8:00 pm, FSKC		Northern Colorado	L 58–60	0–1	Bramlage Coliseum (12,004); Manhattan, KS
11/13/2013*; 7:00 pm, FSKC		Oral Roberts	W 71–63	1–1	Bramlage Coliseum (12,151); Manhattan, KS
11/17/2013*; 3:00 pm, FSKC		Long Beach State	W 71–58	2–1	Bramlage Coliseum (12,003); Manhattan, KS
11/21/2013*; 9:30 am, ESPNU		vs. Charlotte; Puerto Rico Tip-Off First Round	L 61–68	2–2	Roberto Clemente Coliseum (273); San Juan, PR
11/22/2013*; 12:00 pm, ESPNU		vs. Georgetown; Puerto Rico Tip-Off	L 63–90	2–3	Roberto Clemente Coliseum (N/A); San Juan, PR
11/24/2013*; 11:30 am, ESPN3		vs. Long Beach State; Puerto Rico Tip-Off 7th place game	W 52–38	3–3	Roberto Clemente Coliseum (N/A); San Juan, PR
12/01/2013*; 3:00 pm, FSMW/FSKC		Central Arkansas	W 87–54	4–3	Bramlage Coliseum (11,651); Manhattan, KS
12/05/2013*; 8:00 pm, ESPN2		Ole Miss; Big 12/SEC Challenge	W 61–58	5–3	Bramlage Coliseum (11,990); Manhattan, KS
12/10/2013*; 7:00 pm, FSKC		South Dakota	W 64–62	6–3	Bramlage Coliseum (11,612); Manhattan, KS
12/15/2013*; 5:00 pm, FSMW/FSKC		Troy	W 72–43	7–3	Bramlage Coliseum (11,862); Manhattan, KS
12/21/2013*; 2:30 pm, ESPN2		vs. No. 21 Gonzaga; Wichita Wildcat Classic	W 72–62	8–3	Intrust Bank Arena (13,224); Wichita, KS
12/28/2013*; 4:00 pm, FS2		vs. Tulane; Brooklyn Hoops Winter Festival	W 72–41	9–3	Barclays Center (7,203); Brooklyn, NY
12/31/2013*; 2:00 pm, FSMW/FSKC		George Washington	W 72–55	10–3	Bramlage Coliseum (12,532); Manhattan, KS
Big 12 regular season
01/04/2014; 11:00 am, ESPNU		No. 6 Oklahoma State	W 74–71	11–3 (1–0)	Bramlage Coliseum (12,528); Manhattan, KS
01/07/2014; 7:00 pm, B12N	No. 25	at TCU	W 65–47	12–3 (2–0)	Daniel-Meyer Coliseum (4,280); Fort Worth, TX
01/11/2014; 1:00 pm, ESPN	No. 25	at No. 18 Kansas; Sunflower Showdown	L 60–86	12–4 (2–1)	Allen Fieldhouse (16,300); Lawrence, KS
01/14/2014; 6:00 pm, ESPN2		No. 25 Oklahoma	W 72–66	13–4 (3–1)	Bramlage Coliseum (12,250); Manhattan, KS
01/18/2014; 12:30 pm, B12N		West Virginia	W 78–56	14–4 (4–1)	Bramlage Coliseum (12,528); Manhattan, KS
01/21/2014; 6:00 pm, ESPN2	No. 22	at Texas	L 64–67	14–5 (4–2)	Frank Erwin Center (8,918); Austin, TX
01/25/2014; 12:30 pm, B12N	No. 22	at No. 18 Iowa State	L 75–81	14–6 (4–3)	Hilton Coliseum (14,384); Ames, IA
01/28/2014; 7:00 pm, B12N		Texas Tech	W 66–58	15–6 (5–3)	Bramlage Coliseum (11,805); Manhattan, KS
02/01/2014; 12:30 pm, B12N		at West Virginia	L 71–81	15–7 (5–4)	WVU Coliseum (10,121); Morgantown, WV
02/08/2014; 12:30 pm, B12N		No. 15 Texas	W 74–57	16–7 (6–4)	Bramlage Coliseum (12,171); Manhattan, KS
02/10/2014; 8:00 pm, ESPN		No. 7 Kansas; Sunflower Showdown	W 85–82 ^{OT}	17–7 (7–4)	Bramlage Coliseum (12,528); Manhattan, KS
02/15/2014; 6:00 pm, ESPNU		at Baylor	L 73–87 ^{2OT}	17–8 (7–5)	Ferrell Center (7,556); Waco, TX
02/19/2014; 8:00 pm, ESPNU		TCU	W 65–53	18–8 (8–5)	Bramlage Stadium (11,969); Manhattan, KS
02/22/2014; 3:00 pm, B12N		at Oklahoma	L 73–86	18–9 (8–6)	Lloyd Noble Center (12,925); Norman, OK
02/25/2014; 6:00 pm, ESPN2		at Texas Tech	W 60–56	19–10 (9–6)	United Spirit Arena (12,224); Lubbock, TX
03/01/2014; 6:00 pm, ESPNU		No. 15 Iowa State	W 80–73	20–9 (10–6)	Bramlage Coliseum (12,528); Manhattan, KS
03/03/2014; 8:00 pm, ESPN		at Oklahoma State	L 61–77	20–10 (10–7)	Gallagher-Iba Arena (10,969); Stillwater, OK
03/08/2014; 12:30 pm, B12N		Baylor	L 74–76	20–11 (10–8)	Bramlage Coliseum (12,528); Manhattan, KS
Big 12 tournament
03/13/2014; 11:30 am, ESPN2		vs. No. 16 Iowa State; Quarterfinals	L 85–91	20–12	Sprint Center (18,972); Kansas City, MO
NCAA tournament
03/21/2014*; 8:40 pm, CBS	No. (9 MW)	vs. (8 MW) Kentucky; Second round	L 49–56	20–13	Scottrade Center (19,223); St. Louis, MO
*Non-conference game. ^{#}Rankings from AP Poll. (#) Tournament seedings in parentheses. All times are in Central Time. During NCAA Tournament (#) denotes seed within region MW=Midwest.

== Rankings ==
Poll	Pre	Wk 1	Wk 2	Wk 3	Wk 4	Wk 5	Wk 6	Wk 7	Wk 8	Wk 9	Wk 10	Wk 11	Wk 12	Wk 13	Wk 14	Wk 15	Wk 16	Wk 17	Wk 18	Wk 19	Final
AP	RV									RV	25	RV	22	RV		RV	RV		RV		
Coaches	RV										RV	RV	RV	RV		RV	RV	RV	RV	RV	

== Roster ==
2013–14 Kansas State Wildcats men's basketball team
Players
Coaches

Pos.	#	Name	Height	Weight	Year	Hometown
G	1	Shane Southwell	6 ft 7 in (2.01 m)	215 lb (98 kg)	Sr	Harlem, NY
G	2	Marcus Foster	6 ft 2 in (1.88 m)	200 lb (91 kg)	Fr	Wichita Falls, TX
F	3	Jack Karapetyan	6 ft 7 in (2.01 m)	220 lb (100 kg)	Fr	Los Angeles, CA
G	5	Jevon Thomas	6 ft 0 in (1.83 m)	180 lb (82 kg)	Fr	Queens, NY
F	11	Nino Williams	6 ft 5 in (1.96 m)	220 lb (100 kg)	RS Jr	St. Louis, MO
G	12	Omari Lawrence	6 ft 3 in (1.91 m)	205 lb (93 kg)	Sr	Bronx, NY
G	14	Justin Edwards	6 ft 4 in (1.93 m)	195 lb (88 kg)	Jr	Whitby, OT
F	21	Brandon Bolden	6 ft 11 in (2.11 m)	210 lb (95 kg)	So	Sumter, SC
G	23	Nigel Johnson	6 ft 1 in (1.85 m)	180 lb (82 kg)	Fr	Ashburn, VA
F	24	Ryan Schultz	6 ft 5 in (1.96 m)	205 lb (93 kg)	Sr	Wichita, KS
F	25	Wesley Iwundu	6 ft 7 in (2.01 m)	195 lb (88 kg)	Fr	Houston, TX
G	33	Brian Rohleder	6 ft 3 in (1.91 m)	215 lb (98 kg)	RS So	Wichita, KS
G	40	Shawn Meyer	6 ft 3 in (1.91 m)	215 lb (98 kg)	Jr	Kansas City, MO
F	42	Thomas Gipson	6 ft 7 in (2.01 m)	265 lb (120 kg)	Jr	Ceder Hill, TX
F	50	D. J. Johnson	6 ft 9 in (2.06 m)	250 lb (113 kg)	So	Saint Louis, MO
G	55	Will Spradling	6 ft 2 in (1.88 m)	185 lb (84 kg)	Sr	Overland Park, KS

Head coach

- Bruce Weber (Wisconsin–Milwaukee)

Assistant coach(es)

- Chris Lowery (Southern Illinois)
- Alvin Brooks III (Idaho State)
- Chester Frasier (Illinois)

Legend

- (C) Team captain
- (S) Suspended
- (I) Ineligible
- (W) Walk-on
- Injured
- Current redshirt

Roster
Last update: 2013-11-07

== See also ==
- 2013-14 NCAA Division I men's basketball season
- 2013–14 NCAA Division I men's basketball rankings
