= 2013–14 Texas Tech Red Raiders basketball team =

American college basketball season

2013–14 Texas Tech Red Raiders basketball
- Conference: Big 12
- Record: 14–18 (6–12 Big 12)
- Head coach: Tubby Smith (1st season)
- Assistant coaches: Joe Esposito (1st season); Vince Taylor (1st season); Pooh Williamson (1st season)
- Home arena: United Spirit Arena

2013–14 Big 12 men's basketball standings
	Conf.				Overall
Team	W		L	PCT	W		L	PCT
No. 10 Kansas	14	–	4	.778	25	–	10	.714
No. 21 Oklahoma	12	–	6	.667	23	–	10	.697
Texas	11	–	7	.611	24	–	11	.686
No. 9 Iowa State †	11	–	7	.611	28	–	8	.778
Kansas State	10	–	8	.556	20	–	13	.606
West Virginia	9	–	9	.500	17	–	16	.515
No. 23 Baylor	9	–	9	.500	26	–	12	.684
Oklahoma State	8	–	10	.444	21	–	13	.618
Texas Tech	6	–	12	.333	14	–	18	.438
TCU	0	–	18	.000	9	–	22	.290
† 2014 Big 12 Tournament winner Rankings from AP poll

The 2013–14 Texas Tech Red Raiders basketball team represented Texas Tech University in the 2013–14 NCAA Division I men's basketball season. The team was led by head coach Tubby Smith, who brought in a whole new coaching staff for his first season. The Red Raiders played their home games at the United Spirit Arena in Lubbock, Texas and were members of the Big 12 Conference.

Joining Smith as assistant coaches for the 2013–14 season were Joe Esposito, Alvin "Pooh" Williamson, and Vince Taylor.

The Red Raiders finished the season 14–18, 6–12 in Big 12 play to finish in ninth place. They lost in the first round of the Big 12 tournament to Oklahoma State.

== Pre-season ==
=== Departures ===
PG Josh Gray (Transfer)

PG Ty Nurse (Graduated)

=== Recruits ===
The recruiting section will be filled in on Friday afternoon or Saturday morning.

College recruiting
Name	Hometown	School	Height	Weight	Commit date
Overall recruit ranking: Scout: Not Ranked Top 30 Rivals: Not Ranked Top 25 ESPN: Not Ranked Top 50
Note: In many cases, Scout, Rivals, 247Sports, On3, and ESPN may conflict in their listings of height and weight.; In these cases, the average was taken. ESPN grades are on a 100-point scale.; Sources: "Texas Tech 2013 Basketball Commitments". Rivals.; "2013 Texas Tech Basketball Commits". Scout.; "ESPN". ESPN.; "Scout.com Team Recruiting Rankings". Scout.; "2013 Team Ranking". Rivals.

== Schedule ==
Date time, TV	Opponent	Result	Record	Site (attendance) city, state
Exhibition
11/01/2013*; 7:00 pm, FCS Atlantic	Angelo State	W 65–46		United Spirit Arena (2,713); Lubbock, TX
Non-conference regular season
11/08/2013*; 7:00 pm, FCS	Houston Baptist	W 76–61	1–0	United Spirit Arena (5,295); Lubbock, TX
11/11/2013*; 7:00 pm, FSSW	Northern Arizona	W 88–68	2–0	United Spirit Arena (6,002); Lubbock, TX
11/14/2013*; 8:00 pm, ESPN2	at Alabama; Big 12/SEC Challenge	L 64–76	2–1	Coleman Coliseum (10,746); Tuscaloosa, AL
11/18/2013*; 7:00 pm, ESPNU	Texas Southern; Legends Classic	W 80–71	3–1	United Spirit Arena (6,896); Lubbock, TX
11/21/2013*; 7:00 pm, FSSW+	South Dakota State; Legends Classic	W 68–54	4–1	United Spirit Arena (5,714); Lubbock, TX
11/25/2013*; 6:30 pm, ESPN2	vs. Pittsburgh; Legends Classic semifinals	L 53–76	4–2	Barclays Center (6,231); Brooklyn, NY
11/26/2013*; 6:00 pm, ESPN3	vs. Houston; Legends Classic 3rd place game	W 76–64	5–2	Barclays Center (3,514); Brooklyn, NY
11/29/2013*; 7:00 pm, FCS	UTSA	W 94–64	6–2	United Spirit Arena (5,857); Lubbock, TX
12/03/2013*; 8:00 pm, P12N	at No. 2 Arizona	L 58–79	6–3	McKale Center (14,545); Tucson, AZ
12/15/2013*; 1:00 pm, FSSW+	Central Arkansas	W 79–57	7–3	United Spirit Arena (4,894); Lubbock, TX
12/18/2013*; 8:00 pm, ESPNU	LSU	L 69–71	7–4	United Spirit Arena (5,985); Lubbock, TX
12/21/2013*; 5:30 pm, P12N	at Arizona State	L 62–76	7–5	Wells Fargo Arena (6,039); Tempe, AZ
12/30/2013*; 7:00 pm, FCS	Mount St. Mary's	W 100–69	8–5	United Spirit Arena (4,821); Lubbock, TX
Big 12 regular season
01/04/2014; 12:30 pm, B12N	No. 13 Iowa State	L 62–73	8–6 (0–1)	United Spirit Arena (5,861); Lubbock, TX
01/06/2014; 6:00 pm, ESPNU	West Virginia	L 86–89 ^{OT}	8–7 (0–2)	United Spirit Arena (5,232); Lubbock, TX
01/11/2014; 7:00 pm, LHN	at Texas	L 64–67	8–8 (0–3)	Frank Erwin Center (9,097); Austin, TX
01/15/2014; 8:00 pm, ESPNU	No. 12 Baylor	W 82–72	9–8 (1–3)	United Spirit Arena (9,516); Lubbock, TX
01/18/2014; 5:00 pm, FSSW	at TCU	W 61–48	10–8 (2–3)	Daniel-Meyer Coliseum (6,055); Fort Worth, TX
01/22/2014; 7:00 pm, B12N	at West Virginia	L 81–87	10–9 (2–4)	WVU Coliseum (5,031); Morgantown, WV
01/25/2014; 3:00 pm, B12N	Oklahoma	L 65–74	10–10 (2–5)	United Spirit Arena (9,317); Lubbock, TX
01/28/2014; 7:00 pm, B12N	at Kansas State	L 59–66	10–11 (2–6)	Bramlage Coliseum (11,805); Manhattan, KS
02/01/2014; 12:30 pm, B12N	TCU	W 60–54	11–11 (3–6)	United Spirit Arena (7,365); Lubbock, TX
02/08/2014; 8:30 pm, ESPNU	No. 19 Oklahoma State	W 65–61	12–11 (4–6)	United Spirit Arena (15,098); Lubbock, TX
02/12/2014; 7:00 pm, B12N	at Oklahoma	W 68-60	13–11 (5–6)	Lloyd Noble Center (13,002); Norman, OK
02/15/2014; 12:30 pm, B12N	at No. 11 Iowa State	L 64–70	13–12 (5–7)	Hilton Coliseum (14,384); Ames, IA
02/18/2014; 7:00 pm, B12N	No. 8 Kansas	L 63–64	13–13 (5–8)	United Spirit Arena (12,667); Lubbock, TX
02/22/2014; 12:30 pm, B12N	at Oklahoma State	L 62–84	13–14 (5–9)	Gallagher-Iba Arena (11,539); Stillwater, OK
02/25/2014; 6:00 pm, ESPN2	Kansas State	L 56–60	13–15 (5–10)	United Spirit Arena (12,224); Lubbock, TX
03/01/2014; 12:30 pm, B12N	at Baylor	L 49–59	13–16 (5–11)	Ferrell Center (8,827); Waco, TX
03/05/2014; 7:00 pm, B12N	at No. 8 Kansas	L 57–82	13–17 (5–12)	Allen Fieldhouse (16,300); Lawrence, KS
03/08/2014; 3:00 pm, ESPNews	Texas	W 59–53	14–17 (6–12)	United Spirit Arena (12,429); Lubbock, TX
Big 12 Tournament
03/12/2014; 6:00 pm	vs. Oklahoma State; First round	L 62–80	14–18	Sprint Center; Kansas City, MO
*Non-conference game. ^{#}Rankings from AP Poll. (#) Tournament seedings in parentheses. All times are in Central Time.

== Incidents ==
On February 8, 2014, in the closing minutes of a game at Texas Tech, Oklahoma State player Marcus Smart shoved a Texas Tech fan in the stands after a verbal altercation and received a technical foul. At a press conference the following afternoon, neither Smart nor OSU coach Travis Ford addressed the question of what the fan said. OSU announced that Smart would be suspended for 3 games because of the incident. Separately, Texas Tech announced its findings that the fan had not used a racial slur (as had been reported by some sources) but had spoken inappropriately to Smart, and the fan agreed not to attend any further Texas Tech games during the 2013-2014 season.

== See also ==
- 2013–14 Texas Tech Lady Raiders basketball team
