= 2014 Big 12 men's basketball tournament =

- Classification: Division I
- Season: 2013–14
- Teams: 10
- Site: Sprint Center; Kansas City, Missouri
- Champions: Iowa State (2nd title)
- Winning coach: Fred Hoiberg (1st title)
- MVP: DeAndre Kane (Iowa State)
- Attendance: 94,996 (overall); 19,108 (championship)
- Top scorer: Georges Niang (Iowa State) (56 points)
- Television: ESPN, ESPN2, ESPNU, Big 12 Network

2013–14 Big 12 men's basketball standings
	Conf.				Overall
Team	W		L	PCT	W		L	PCT
No. 10 Kansas	14	–	4	.778	25	–	10	.714
No. 21 Oklahoma	12	–	6	.667	23	–	10	.697
Texas	11	–	7	.611	24	–	11	.686
No. 9 Iowa State †	11	–	7	.611	28	–	8	.778
Kansas State	10	–	8	.556	20	–	13	.606
West Virginia	9	–	9	.500	17	–	16	.515
No. 23 Baylor	9	–	9	.500	26	–	12	.684
Oklahoma State	8	–	10	.444	21	–	13	.618
Texas Tech	6	–	12	.333	14	–	18	.438
TCU	0	–	18	.000	9	–	22	.290
† 2014 Big 12 Tournament winner Rankings from AP poll

The 2014 Phillips 66 Big 12 men's basketball tournament was the postseason men's basketball tournament for the Big 12 Conference held from March 12 to 15 in Kansas City, Missouri at Sprint Center.

== Seeding ==
The Tournament consisted of a 10 team single-elimination tournament with the top 6 seeds receiving a bye.

2014 Big 12 Men's Basketball Tournament seeds
Seed	School	Conf.	Over.	Tiebreaker
1	Kansas ‡#	14–4	25–10	
2	Oklahoma #	12–6	23–10	
3	Texas #	11–7	24–11	1–1 vs. Iowa State; 1–1 vs. #1 Kansas
4	Iowa State #	11–7	28–8	1–1 vs. Texas; 0–2 vs. #1 Kansas
5	Kansas State #	10–8	20–13	
6	West Virginia #	9–9	17–16	1–1 vs. Baylor; 1–1 vs. #1 Kansas
7	Baylor	9–9	26–12	1–1 vs. WV; 0–2 vs. #1 Kansas
8	Oklahoma State	8–10	21–13	
9	Texas Tech	6–12	14–18	
10	TCU	0–18	9–22	
‡ – Big 12 Conference regular season champions, and tournament No. 1 seed. # – Received a single-bye in the conference tournament. Overall records include all games played in the Big 12 Conference tournament.

== Schedule ==
Session	Game	Time	Matchup	Television	Attendance
First Round – Wednesday, March 12
1	1	6:00 pm	#8 Oklahoma State 80 vs #9 Texas Tech 62	Big 12 Network	18,972
1	2	8:30 pm	#7 Baylor 76 vs #10 TCU 68	Big 12 Network	18,972
Quarterfinals – Thursday, March 13
2	3	11:30 am	#4 Iowa State 91 vs #5 Kansas State 85	ESPN2	18,972
2	4	2:00 pm	#1 Kansas 77 vs #8 Oklahoma State 70 ^{OT}	ESPN2	18,972
3	5	6:00 pm	#7 Baylor 78 vs #2 Oklahoma 73	Big 12 Network	18,972
3	6	8:30 pm	#3 Texas 66 vs #6 West Virginia 49	Big 12 Network	18,972
Semifinals – Friday, March 14
4	7	6:00 pm	#4 Iowa State 94 vs #1 Kansas 83	ESPNU	18,972
4	8	8:30 pm	#7 Baylor 86 vs #3 Texas 69	ESPNU	18,972
Final – Saturday, March 15
5	9	8:00 pm	#4 Iowa State 74 vs #7 Baylor 65	ESPN	19,108
Game times in CT. #-Rankings denote tournament seed

== Bracket ==
First round Wednesday, March 12
8	Oklahoma State	80
9	Texas Tech	62
7	Baylor	76
10	TCU	68

Quarterfinals; Thursday, March 13
1	#10 Kansas	77*
8	Oklahoma State	70
4	#16 Iowa State	91
5	Kansas State	85
2	#17 Oklahoma	73
7	Baylor	78
3	Texas	66
6	West Virginia	49

Semifinals; Friday, March 14
1	#10 Kansas	83
4	#16 Iowa State	94
7	Baylor	86
3	Texas	69

Championship; Saturday, March 15
4	#16 Iowa State	74
7	Baylor	65

* denotes overtime period

== All-Tournament Team ==
Most Outstanding Player – DeAndre Kane, Iowa State

Player	Team	Position	Class
DeAndre Kane	Iowa State	Sr.	G
Melvin Ejim	Iowa State	Sr.	F
Georges Niang	Iowa State	So.	F
Isaiah Austin	Baylor	So.	C
Andrew Wiggins	Kansas	Fr.	G

== See also ==
- 2014 Big 12 Conference women's basketball tournament
- 2014 NCAA Division I men's basketball tournament
- 2013–14 NCAA Division I men's basketball rankings
