= 2013–14 Oklahoma State Cowboys basketball team =

American college basketball season

2013–14 Oklahoma State Cowboys basketball

NCAA tournament, round of 64
- Conference: Big 12 Conference
- Record: 21–13 (8–10 Big 12)
- Head coach: Travis Ford (6th season)
- Assistant coaches: Butch Pierre; Chris Ferguson; Steve Middleton
- Home arena: Gallagher-Iba Arena

2013–14 Big 12 men's basketball standings
	Conf.				Overall
Team	W		L	PCT	W		L	PCT
No. 10 Kansas	14	–	4	.778	25	–	10	.714
No. 21 Oklahoma	12	–	6	.667	23	–	10	.697
Texas	11	–	7	.611	24	–	11	.686
No. 9 Iowa State †	11	–	7	.611	28	–	8	.778
Kansas State	10	–	8	.556	20	–	13	.606
West Virginia	9	–	9	.500	17	–	16	.515
No. 23 Baylor	9	–	9	.500	26	–	12	.684
Oklahoma State	8	–	10	.444	21	–	13	.618
Texas Tech	6	–	12	.333	14	–	18	.438
TCU	0	–	18	.000	9	–	22	.290
† 2014 Big 12 Tournament winner Rankings from AP poll

The 2013–14 Oklahoma State Cowboys basketball team represented Oklahoma State University in the 2013–14 NCAA Division I men's basketball season. This was head coach Travis Ford's sixth season at Oklahoma State. The Cowboys were members of the Big 12 Conference and played their home games at the Gallagher-Iba Arena. They finished the season 21–13, 8–10 in Big 12 play to finish in eighth place. They advanced to the quarterfinals of the Big 12 tournament where they lost to Kansas. They received an at-large bid to the NCAA tournament where they lost to Gonzaga in the second round.

== Recruits ==
College recruiting
Name	Hometown	School	Height	Weight	Commit date
Jeffrey Carroll; SF	Rowlett, Texas	Rowlett High School	6 ft 5 in (1.96 m)	200 lb (91 kg)	
Jeffrey Carroll; SF	Recruit ratings: Scout: Rivals: (75)				
Stevie Clark; PG	Oklahoma City, Oklahoma	Frederick A. Douglass High School	5 ft 10 in (1.78 m)	160 lb (73 kg)	
Stevie Clark; PG	Recruit ratings: Scout: Rivals: (85)				
Gary Gaskins; C	Cocoa, Florida	Brevard Community College	6 ft 10 in (2.08 m)	210 lb (95 kg)	
Gary Gaskins; C	Recruit ratings: Scout: Rivals: (JC)				
Leyton Hammonds; SF	North Richland Hills, Texas	Richland High School	6 ft 8 in (2.03 m)	200 lb (91 kg)	
Leyton Hammonds; SF	Recruit ratings: Scout: Rivals: (75)				
Overall recruit ranking:
Note: In many cases, Scout, Rivals, 247Sports, On3, and ESPN may conflict in their listings of height and weight.; In these cases, the average was taken. ESPN grades are on a 100-point scale.; Sources: "2013 Oklahoma State Basketball Commits". Scout.; "ESPN". ESPN.; "Scout.com Team Recruiting Rankings". Scout.; "2013 Team Ranking". Rivals.

== Roster ==
2013–14 Oklahoma State Cowboys men's basketball team
Players
Coaches

Pos.	#	Name	Height	Weight	Year	Previous school	Hometown
G	1	Ford Stuen	6 ft 3 in (1.91 m)	190 lb (86 kg)	So	Henderson County; IMG Academy (Fla.)	Henderson, KY
G/F	2	Le'Bryan Nash	6 ft 7 in (2.01 m)	235 lb (107 kg)	Jr	Lincoln	Dallas, TX
G/F	4	Brian Williams (C)	6 ft 5 in (1.96 m)	210 lb (95 kg)	RS Jr	Glen Oaks	Baton Rouge, LA
G	12	Jackson Perez	6 ft 1 in (1.85 m)	180 lb (82 kg)	Fr	Emporia	Emporia, KS
G	13	Phil Forte	5 ft 11 in (1.8 m)	185 lb (84 kg)	So	Marcus	Flower Mound, TX
F/C	14	Marek Souček	7 ft 0 in (2.13 m)	240 lb (109 kg)	Jr	Canarias Academy	Brno, Czech Republic
G/F	15	Christien Sager	6 ft 4 in (1.93 m)	205 lb (93 kg)	Jr	Rider	Wichita Falls, TX
F	20	Michael Cobbins	6 ft 8 in (2.03 m)	230 lb (104 kg)	RS Jr	Palo Duro	Amarillo, TX
F/C	21	Kamari Murphy	6 ft 8 in (2.03 m)	220 lb (100 kg)	So	Lincoln; IMG Academy (Fla.)	Brooklyn, NY
G	22	Markel Brown (C)	6 ft 3 in (1.91 m)	190 lb (86 kg)	Sr	Peabody Magnet	Alexandria, LA
G/F	23	Leyton Hammonds	6 ft 7 in (2.01 m)	205 lb (93 kg)	Fr	Richland	North Richland Hills, TX
G	24	Alex Budke	6 ft 2 in (1.88 m)	190 lb (86 kg)	Jr	Stillwater	Stillwater, OK
G/F	30	Jeffrey Carroll	6 ft 6 in (1.98 m)	205 lb (93 kg)	Fr	Rowlett	Rowlett, TX
G	33	Marcus Smart	6 ft 4 in (1.93 m)	220 lb (100 kg)	So	Marcus	Flower Mound, TX
F/C	34	Gary Gaskins	6 ft 10 in (2.08 m)	200 lb (91 kg)	Jr	Beaufort; Brevard Community College (Fla.)	Beaufort, SC
G	53	Mason Cox	6 ft 10 in (2.08 m)	230 lb (104 kg)	RS Sr	Marcus	Highland Village, TX

Head coach

- Travis Ford (Kentucky)

Assistant coach(es)

- Butch Pierre (Mississippi State)
- Chris Ferguson (Cumberlands)
- Steve Middleton (Southern Illinois)

Legend

- (C) Team captain
- (S) Suspended
- (I) Ineligible
- (W) Walk-on
- Injured
- Current redshirt

== Schedule and results ==
Date time, TV	Rank^{#}	Opponent^{#}	Result	Record	Site (attendance) city, state
Exhibition
10/27/2013*; 2:00 pm, CSN	No. 8	Campbellsville	W 80–70	–	Gallagher-Iba Arena (9,402); Stillwater, OK
11/01/2013*; 7:00 pm	No. 8	Emporia State	W 87–51	–	Gallagher-Iba Arena (7,200); Stillwater, OK
Non-conference regular season
11/08/2013*; 7:00 pm, CSN	No. 8	Mississippi Valley State	W 117–62	1–0	Gallagher-Iba Arena (9,402); Stillwater, OK
11/12/2013*; 7:00 pm, FCS Central	No. 8	Utah Valley	W 93–40	2–0	Gallagher-Iba Arena (7,526); Stillwater, OK
11/15/2013*; 7:00 pm, CSN	No. 8	Arkansas–Pine Bluff	W 97–63	3–0	Gallagher-Iba Arena (8,321); Stillwater, OK
11/19/2013*; 6:30 pm, ESPN	No. 7	No. 11 Memphis; Old Spice Classic	W 101–80	4–0	Gallagher-Iba Arena (13,611); Stillwater, OK
11/25/2013*; 6:00 pm	No. 5	at South Florida	W 93–67	5–0	USF Sun Dome (6,240); Tampa, FL
11/28/2013*; 11:00 am, ESPN2	No. 5	vs. Purdue; Old Spice Classic First Round	W 97–87	6–0	HP Field House (4,255); Lake Buena Vista, FL
11/29/2013*; 12:30 pm, ESPN	No. 5	vs. Butler; Old Spice Classic semifinals	W 69–67	7–0	HP Field House (4,182); Lake Buena Vista, FL
12/01/2013*; 6:30 pm, ESPN2	No. 5	vs. No. 21 Memphis; Old Spice Classic	L 68–73	7–1	HP Field House (3,633); Lake Buena Vista, FL
12/06/2013*; 8:30 pm, ESPNU	No. 9	South Carolina; Big 12/SEC Challenge	W 79–52	8–1	Gallagher-Iba Arena (13,611); Stillwater, OK
12/14/2013*; 1:00 pm, ESPNU	No. 7	vs. Louisiana Tech; All-College Basketball Classic	W 70–55	9–1	Chesapeake Energy Arena (7,047); Oklahoma City, OK
12/17/2013*; 7:00 pm, CSN	No. 7	Delaware State	W 75–43	10–1	Gallagher-Iba Arena (8,579); Stillwater, OK
12/21/2013*; 10:30 pm, ESPN2	No. 7	vs. No. 20 Colorado; MGM Grand Showcase	W 78–73	11–1	MGM Grand Garden Arena (5,207); Paradise, NV
12/30/2013*; 7:00 pm, CSN	No. 6	Robert Morris	W 92–66	12–1	Gallagher-Iba Arena (9,514); Stillwater, OK
Conference regular season
01/04/2014; 11:00 am, ESPNU	No. 6	at Kansas State	L 71–74	12–2 (0–1)	Bramlage Coliseum (12,528); Manhattan, KS
01/08/2014; 8:00 pm, ESPNU	No. 11	Texas	W 87–74	13–2 (1–1)	Gallagher-Iba Arena (9,068); Stillwater, OK
01/11/2014; 3:00 pm, B12N	No. 11	at West Virginia	W 73–72	14–2 (2–1)	WVU Coliseum (12,078); Morgantown, WV
01/15/2014; 7:00 pm, B12N	No. 9	TCU	W 82–50	15–2 (3–1)	Gallagher-Iba Arena (8,890); Stillwater, OK
01/18/2014; 3:00 pm, CBS	No. 9	at No. 15 Kansas	L 78–80	15–3 (3–2)	Allen Fieldhouse (16,300); Lawrence, KS
01/25/2014; 1:00 pm, ESPN2	No. 11	West Virginia	W 81–75	16–3 (4–2)	Gallagher-Iba Arena (10,011); Stillwater, OK
01/27/2014; 8:00 pm, ESPN	No. 8	at No. 23 Oklahoma; Bedlam Series	L 76–88	16–4 (4–3)	Lloyd Noble Center (13,093); Norman, OK
02/01/2014; 1:00 pm, ESPN	No. 8	Baylor	L 70–76	16–5 (4–4)	Gallagher-Iba Arena (11,500); Stillwater, OK
02/03/2014; 8:00 pm, ESPN	No. 19	No. 16 Iowa State	L 97–98 ^{3OT}	16–6 (4–5)	Gallagher-Iba Arena (10,132); Stillwater, OK
02/08/2014; 8:30 pm, ESPNU	No. 19	at Texas Tech	L 61–65	16–7 (4–6)	United Spirit Arena (15,098); Lubbock, TX
02/11/2014; 6:00 pm, ESPN2		at No. 19 Texas	L 68–87	16–8 (4–7)	Frank Erwin Center (10,904); Austin, TX
02/15/2014; 1:00 pm, ESPN2		Oklahoma; Bedlam Series	L 74–77	16–9 (4–8)	Gallagher-Iba Arena (10,070); Stillwater, OK
02/17/2014; 8:00 pm, ESPN		at Baylor	L 64–70 ^{OT}	16–10 (4–9)	Ferrell Center (6,517); Waco, TX
02/22/2014; 12:30 pm, B12N		Texas Tech	W 84–62	17–10 (5–9)	Gallagher-Iba Arena (11,539); Stillwater, OK
02/24/2014; 6:00 pm, ESPNU		at TCU	W 76–54	18–10 (6–9)	Daniel-Meyer Coliseum (5,723); Ft. Worth, TX
03/01/2014; 8:00 pm, ESPN		No. 5 Kansas; ESPN College GameDay	W 72–65	19–10 (7–9)	Gallagher-Iba Arena (13,611); Stillwater, OK
03/03/2014; 8:00 pm, ESPN		Kansas State	W 77–61	20–10 (8–9)	Gallagher-Iba Arena (10,969); Stillwater, OK
03/08/2014; 1:00 pm, ESPN		at No. 16 Iowa State	L 81–85 ^{OT}	20–11 (8–10)	Hilton Coliseum (14,384); Ames, IA
Big 12 tournament
03/12/2014; 6:00 pm, B12N	(8)	vs. (9) Texas Tech; First round	W 80–62	21–11	Sprint Center (18,972); Kansas City, MO
03/13/2014; 2:00 pm, ESPN2	(8)	vs. (1) No. 10 Kansas; Quarterfinals	L 70–77 ^{OT}	21–12	Sprint Center (18,972); Kansas City, MO
NCAA tournament
03/21/2014*; 3:40 pm, TNT	(9 W)	vs. (8 W) Gonzaga; Second Round	L 77–85	21–13	Viejas Arena (11,196); San Diego, CA
*Non-conference game. ^{#}Rankings from AP Poll. (#) Tournament seedings in parentheses. All times are in Central Time. For NCAA tournament (#) is seed within region W=West.

CSN = Cowboy Sports Network. The Cowboy Sports Network is affiliated with Fox Sports Net. Games could air on Fox Sports Oklahoma, Fox Sports Oklahoma Plus, Fox Sports Southwest, Fox Sports Southwest Plus, or Fox College Sports.

== Rankings ==
Ranking movement Legend: ██ Increase in ranking. ██ Decrease in ranking. ██ Not ranked the previous week.
Poll	Pre	Wk 2	Wk 3	Wk 4	Wk 5	Wk 6	Wk 7	Wk 8	Wk 9	Wk 10	Wk 11	Wk 12	Wk 13	Wk 14	Wk 15	Wk 16	Wk 17	Wk 18	Wk 19	Final
AP	8т	8	7	5	9	7	7	7	6	11	9	11	8	19	RV	NR	NR	RV	NR	*N/A
Coaches	12	12	9	8	11	9	7	7	6	12	8	12т	10	19	RV	NR	NR	RV	RV	NR

*AP does not release post-tournament rankings

== See also ==
2013–14 Oklahoma State Cowgirls basketball team
