= 2013–14 West Virginia Mountaineers men's basketball team =

American college basketball season

2013–14 West Virginia Mountaineers men's basketball

NIT First round vs. Georgetown, L 65–77
- Conference: Big 12 Conference
- Record: 17–16 (9–9 Big 12)
- Head coach: Bob Huggins (7th season)
- Assistant coaches: Larry Harrison; Erik Martin; Ron Everhart
- Home arena: WVU Coliseum

2013–14 Big 12 men's basketball standings
	Conf.				Overall
Team	W		L	PCT	W		L	PCT
No. 10 Kansas	14	–	4	.778	25	–	10	.714
No. 21 Oklahoma	12	–	6	.667	23	–	10	.697
Texas	11	–	7	.611	24	–	11	.686
No. 9 Iowa State †	11	–	7	.611	28	–	8	.778
Kansas State	10	–	8	.556	20	–	13	.606
West Virginia	9	–	9	.500	17	–	16	.515
No. 23 Baylor	9	–	9	.500	26	–	12	.684
Oklahoma State	8	–	10	.444	21	–	13	.618
Texas Tech	6	–	12	.333	14	–	18	.438
TCU	0	–	18	.000	9	–	22	.290
† 2014 Big 12 Tournament winner Rankings from AP poll

The 2013–14 West Virginia Mountaineers men's basketball team represented West Virginia University during the 2013–14 NCAA Division I men's basketball season. The Mountaineers were coached by seventh year head coach Bob Huggins and played their home games at WVU Coliseum. They finished the season 17–16, 9–9 in Big 12 play to finish in a tie for sixth place. They lost in the quarterfinals of the Big 12 tournament to Texas. They were invited to the National Invitation Tournament where they lost in the first round to Georgetown.

== Before the season ==
=== Departures ===
Name	Number	Pos.	Height	Weight	Year	Hometown	Notes
Dominique Rutledge	1	F	6'8"	245	Senior	Newark, New Jersey	Graduated
Deniz Kılıçlı	13	F	6'9"	260	Senior	Istanbul, Turkey	Graduated
Matt Humphrey	21	G	6'5"	195	Senior	Chicago, Illinois	Graduated
Aaric Murray	24	C	6'10"	250	Senior	Philadelphia, Pennsylvania	Transferred to Texas Southern
Jabarie Hinds	4	G	5'11"	180	Sophomore	Mount Vernon, New York	Transferred to UMass
Aaron Brown	12	F	6'5"	220	Sophomore	Darby, Pennsylvania	Transferred to Saint Joseph's
Keaton Miles	55	F	6'6"	205	Sophomore	Dallas, Texas	Transferred to Arkansas

=== Recruits ===
College recruiting
Name	Hometown	School	Height	Weight	Commit date
Devin Williams (basketball); PF	Cincinnati, OH	Montverde Academy (FL)	6 ft 8 in (2.03 m)	220 lb (100 kg)	Nov 3, 2012
Devin Williams (basketball); PF	Recruit ratings: Scout: Rivals: (88)				
Elijah Macon; PF	Columbus, OH	Brewster Academy (NH)	6 ft 8 in (2.03 m)	225 lb (102 kg)	Sep 23, 2011
Elijah Macon; PF	Recruit ratings: Scout: Rivals: (83)				
Brandon Watkins; C	Decatur, GA	Grady	6 ft 9 in (2.06 m)	225 lb (102 kg)	Oct 7, 2011
Brandon Watkins; C	Recruit ratings: Scout: Rivals: (78)				
Nathan Adrian; PF	Morgantown, WV	Morgantown	6 ft 7 in (2.01 m)	200 lb (91 kg)	Sep 9, 2011
Nathan Adrian; PF	Recruit ratings: Scout: Rivals: (71)				
Daxter Miles; PG	Baltimore, MD	Dunbar	6 ft 2 in (1.88 m)	175 lb (79 kg)	Jun 1, 2013
Daxter Miles; PG	Recruit ratings: Scout: Rivals: (NR)				
Overall recruit ranking: Scout: Not Ranked Rivals: 23 ESPN: 20
Note: In many cases, Scout, Rivals, 247Sports, On3, and ESPN may conflict in their listings of height and weight.; In these cases, the average was taken. ESPN grades are on a 100-point scale.; Sources: "West Virginia 2013 Basketball Commitments". Rivals.; "2013 West Virginia Basketball Commits". Scout.; "ESPN". ESPN.; "Scout.com Team Recruiting Rankings". Scout.; "2013 Team Ranking". Rivals.

In addition to the five high school players signed, coach Bob Huggins also received commitments from Junior College transfers Jonathan Holton (Palm Beach Community College) and Remi Dibo (Casper College), both forwards.

== Season ==
=== Preseason ===
Head coach Bob Huggins announced the Mountaineers' full season schedule on August 8, 2013. The Mountaineers would play home dates against opponents such as Gonzaga and Purdue, as well as participating in the annual Cancún Challenge with 2013 NCAA Tournament teams such as Saint Louis and Wisconsin. The Mountaineers also scheduled to visit Virginia Tech and Missouri, with the Missouri game part of the first ever Big 12/SEC Challenge. West Virginia's 18 game conference slate included home and away dates against each of the nine other members of the Big 12 Conference.

== Roster ==
2013–14 West Virginia Mountaineers men's basketball team
Players
Coaches

Pos.	#	Name	Height	Weight	Year	Previous school	Hometown
F	0	Remi Dibo	6 ft 9 in (2.06 m)	220 lb (100 kg)	Jr	Casper College	Montreuil, France
F	1	Jonathan Holton	6 ft 7 in (2.01 m)	215 lb (98 kg)	Jr	Palm Beach State CC	Miami, FL
G	3	Juwan Staten	6 ft 1 in (1.85 m)	190 lb (86 kg)	Jr	Dayton	Dayton, OH
F	5	Devin Williams	6 ft 8 in (2.03 m)	250 lb (113 kg)	Fr	Montverde Academy	Cincinnati, OH
G	10	Eron Harris	6 ft 2 in (1.88 m)	195 lb (88 kg)	So	Lawrence North	Indianapolis, IN
F	11	Nathan Adrian	6 ft 8 in (2.03 m)	220 lb (100 kg)	Fr	Morgantown	Morgantown, WV
G	14	Gary Browne	6 ft 1 in (1.85 m)	195 lb (88 kg)	Jr	Arlington Country Day	Cupey, San Juan, Puerto Rico
G	15	Terry Henderson	6 ft 3 in (1.91 m)	200 lb (91 kg)	So	Neuse Baptist Christian	Raleigh, NC
F	20	Brandon Watkins	6 ft 9 in (2.06 m)	225 lb (102 kg)	Fr	Grady	Decatur, GA
G	30	Richard Romero	5 ft 11 in (1.8 m)	195 lb (88 kg)	So	Greenbrier East	White Sulphur Springs, WV
F	34	Kevin Noreen	6 ft 10 in (2.08 m)	255 lb (116 kg)	Jr	Minnesota Transitions Charter	Minneapolis, MN
F	45	Elijah Macon	6 ft 9 in (2.06 m)	250 lb (113 kg)	Fr	Brewster Academy	Columbus, OH

Head coach

- Bob Huggins (West Virginia)

Assistant coach(es)

- Larry Harrison (Pittsburgh)
- Ron Everhart (Virginia Tech)
- Erik Martin (Cincinnati)

Legend

- (C) Team captain
- (S) Suspended
- (I) Ineligible
- (W) Walk-on
- Injured
- Current redshirt

== Schedule and results ==
Sources: and

Date time, TV	Rank^{#}	Opponent^{#}	Result	Record	Site (attendance) city, state
Exhibition
11/04/2013*; 7:00 pm		Fairmont State	W 89–70	–	WVU Coliseum (5,375); Morgantown, WV
Non-conference games
11/08/2013*; 8:00 pm		Mount St. Mary's	W 77–62	1–0	WVU Coliseum (8,336); Morgantown, WV
11/12/2013*; 1:00 pm, ESPN		at Virginia Tech; ESPN Tip-Off Marathon	L 82–87	1–1	Cassell Coliseum (5,049); Blacksburg, VA
11/17/2013*; 4:00 pm, RTPT		Duquesne	W 96–83	2–1	WVU Coliseum (6,038); Morgantown, WV
11/21/2013*; 7:00 pm, RTPT		Georgia Southern; Cancún Challenge	W 101–68	3–1	WVU Coliseum (4,814); Morgantown, WV
11/23/2013*; 1:30 pm, RTPT		Presbyterian; Cancún Challenge	W 88–55	4–1	WVU Coliseum (5,067); Morgantown, WV
11/26/2013*; 6:00 pm, CBSSN		vs. Old Dominion; Cancún Challenge Semifinals	W 78–60	5–1	Hard Rock Hotel Riviera Maya (934); Cancún, MX
11/27/2013*; 9:30 pm, CBSSN		vs. No. 10 Wisconsin; Cancún Challenge Championship	L 63–70	5–2	Hard Rock Hotel Riviera Maya (934); Cancún, MX
12/02/2013*; 7:00 pm, RTPT		Loyola (MD)	W 96–47	6–2	WVU Coliseum (4,692); Morgantown, WV
12/05/2013*; 7:00 pm, ESPN2		at Missouri; Big 12/SEC Challenge	L 71–80	6–3	Mizzou Arena (7,292); Columbia, MO
12/10/2013*; 9:00 pm, ESPNU		No. 20 Gonzaga	L 76–80	6–4	WVU Coliseum (9,350); Morgantown, WV
12/14/2013*; 7:30 pm, RTPT		vs. Marshall; Chesapeake Energy Capital Classic	W 74–64	7–4	Charleston Civic Center (11,038); Charleston, WV
12/22/2013*; 1:00 pm, ESPNU		Purdue	L 70–73	7–5	WVU Coliseum (10,019); Morgantown, WV
12/29/2013*; 3:00 pm, RTPT		vs. William & Mary	W 82–45	8–5	Charleston Civic Center (8,885); Charleston, WV
Conference games
01/04/2014; 4:00 pm, B12N		at TCU	W 74–69	9–5 (1–0)	Daniel–Meyer Coliseum (5,038); Fort Worth, TX
01/06/2014; 7:00 pm, ESPNU		at Texas Tech	W 89–86 ^{OT}	10–5 (2–0)	United Spirit Arena (5,005); Lubbock, TX
01/11/2014; 4:00 pm, B12N		No. 11 Oklahoma State	L 72–73	10–6 (2–1)	WVU Coliseum (12,078); Morgantown, WV
01/13/2014; 7:00 pm, ESPNU		Texas	L 69–80	10–7 (2–2)	WVU Coliseum (8,706); Morgantown, WV
01/18/2014; 1:30 pm, B12N		at Kansas State	L 56–78	10–8 (2–3)	Bramlage Coliseum (12,528); Manhattan, KS
01/22/2014; 8:00 pm, B12N		Texas Tech	W 87–81	11–8 (3–3)	WVU Coliseum (5,031); Morgantown, WV
01/25/2014; 2:00 pm, ESPN2		at Oklahoma State	L 75–81	11–9 (3–4)	Gallagher-Iba Arena (10,011); Stillwater, OK
01/28/2014; 7:00 pm, ESPN2		at Baylor	W 66–64	12–9 (4–4)	Ferrell Center (5,529); Waco, TX
02/01/2014; 1:30 pm, B12N		Kansas State	W 81–71	13–9 (5–4)	WVU Coliseum (10,121); Morgantown, WV
02/05/2014; 7:00 pm, ESPNU		No. 21 Oklahoma	W 91–86 ^{OT}	14–9 (6–4)	WVU Coliseum (7,538); Morgantown, WV
02/08/2014; 4:00 pm, ESPN		at No. 8 Kansas	L 69–83	14–10 (6–5)	Allen Fieldhouse (16,300); Lawrence, KS
02/10/2014; 7:00 pm, ESPNU		No. 11 Iowa State	W 102–77	15–10 (7–5)	WVU Coliseum (8,177); Morgantown, WV
02/15/2014; 8:00 pm, LHN		at No. 19 Texas	L 71–88	15–11 (7–6)	Frank Erwin Center (12,179); Austin, TX
02/22/2014; 1:30 pm, B12N		Baylor	L 75–88	15–12 (7–7)	WVU Coliseum (11,843); Morgantown, WV
02/26/2014; 8:00 pm, B12N		at Iowa State	L 66–83	15–13 (7–8)	Hilton Coliseum (14,384); Ames, IA
03/01/2014; 1:30 pm, RTPT		TCU	W 81–59	16–13 (8–8)	WVU Coliseum (11,358); Morgantown, WV
03/05/2014; 9:00 pm, ESPNU		at No. 23 Oklahoma	L 62–72	16–14 (8–9)	Lloyd Noble Center (10,674); Norman, OK
03/08/2014; 12:00 pm, ESPN		No. 8 Kansas	W 92–86	17–14 (9–9)	WVU Coliseum (14,038); Morgantown, WV
Big 12 tournament
03/13/2014; 8:30 pm, B12N		vs. Texas; Quarterfinals	L 49–66	17–15	Sprint Center (18,972); Kansas City, MO
NIT
03/18/2014*; 7:00 pm, ESPN	No. (5)	at (4) Georgetown; First round	L 65–77	17–16	McDonough Gymnasium (2,133); Washington, DC
*Non-conference game. ^{#}Rankings from AP Poll, (#) during NIT is seed within region. (#) Tournament seedings in parentheses. All times are in Eastern Time..

== See also ==
- 2013–14 NCAA Division I men's basketball rankings
- 2013–14 West Virginia Mountaineers women's basketball team
