= 2013–14 Big 12 Conference men's basketball season =

2013–14 Big 12 Men's Basketball Season
- League: NCAA Division I
- Sport: Basketball
- Teams: 10
- TV partner(s): CBS, ESPN, FSN

Regular Season
- 2014 Big 12 Champions: Kansas
- Runners-up: Oklahoma
- Season MVP: Melvin Ejim
- Top scorer: Melvin Ejim

Tournament
- Champions: Iowa State
- Runners-up: Baylor
- Finals MVP: DeAndre Kane

Basketball seasons
- ← 2012–13 2014–15 →

2013–14 Big 12 men's basketball standings
	Conf.				Overall
Team	W		L	PCT	W		L	PCT
No. 10 Kansas	14	–	4	.778	25	–	10	.714
No. 21 Oklahoma	12	–	6	.667	23	–	10	.697
Texas	11	–	7	.611	24	–	11	.686
No. 9 Iowa State †	11	–	7	.611	28	–	8	.778
Kansas State	10	–	8	.556	20	–	13	.606
West Virginia	9	–	9	.500	17	–	16	.515
No. 23 Baylor	9	–	9	.500	26	–	12	.684
Oklahoma State	8	–	10	.444	21	–	13	.618
Texas Tech	6	–	12	.333	14	–	18	.438
TCU	0	–	18	.000	9	–	22	.290
† 2014 Big 12 Tournament winner Rankings from AP poll

The 2013–14 Big 12 men's basketball season will begin with practices in October 2013, followed by the start of the regular-season in November. Conference play is scheduled to begin in early-January 2014, and conclude in March with the 2014 Big 12 men's basketball tournament at the Sprint Center in Kansas City.

== Preseason ==
	Big 12 Coaches
1.	Kansas (5)
1.	Oklahoma State (5)
3.	Baylor
4.	Iowa State
5.	Kansas State
5.	Oklahoma
7.	West Virginia
8.	Texas
9.	Texas Tech
10.	TCU

() first place votes

Pre-Season All-Big 12 Teams

Big 12 Coaches
Isaiah Austin, C Baylor
Cory Jefferson, F Baylor
Melvin Ejim, F Iowa State
Andrew Wiggins, G Kansas
Marcus Smart, G Oklahoma State

- Player of the Year: Marcus Smart, Oklahoma State
- Newcomer of the Year: Tarik Black, Kansas
- Freshman of the Year: Andrew Wiggins, Kansas

== Rankings ==
Legend
Increase in ranking
Decrease in ranking
Not ranked previous week

		Pre	Wk 2	Wk 3	Wk 4	Wk 5	Wk 6	Wk 7	Wk 8	Wk 9	Wk 10	Wk 11	Wk 12	Wk 13	Wk 14	Wk 15	Wk 16	Wk 17	Wk 18	Wk 19	Wk 20	Final
Baylor	AP	25	23	20	18	20	14	12	11	9	7	12	24							RV	23	
Baylor	C	RV	25	21	17	20	18	15	12	11	9	13	23	RV	RV			RV		RV	RV	18
Iowa State	AP			21	17	17	17	17	14	13	9	8	16	16	16	11	17	15	16	16	9	
Iowa State	C	RV	RV	RV	22	18	16	13	13	12	7	10	17	18	17	14	19	17	17	16	9	11
Kansas	AP	5	5	2	2	6	13	18	16	16	18	15	8	6	8	7	8	5	8	10	10	
Kansas	C	6	6	3	2	7	13	19	16	17	20	18	11	7	9	7	8	6	8	10	10	14
Kansas State	AP									RV	25	RV	22	RV		RV	RV		RV			
Kansas State	C	RV									RV	RV	RV	RV		RV	RV	RV	RV	RV		
Oklahoma	AP						RV	RV	RV	RV	RV	25	25	23	21	RV	RV	RV	23	17	21	
Oklahoma	C							RV	RV	RV	RV	RV	25	25	23	25	RV	25	23	18	20	RV
Oklahoma State	AP	8	8	7	5	9	7	7	7	6	11	9	11	8	19	RV			RV			
Oklahoma State	C	12	12	9	8	11	9	7	7	6	12	8	12	10	19	RV			RV	RV		
TCU	AP																					
TCU	C																					
Texas	AP								RV	RV			RV	25	15	19	19	24	RV	RV	RV	
Texas	C								RV	RV	RV		RV	RV	18	19	17	23	RV	RV	RV	RV
Texas Tech	AP																					
Texas Tech	C																					
West Virginia	AP																					
West Virginia	C															RV	RV					

== Conference Schedules ==
=== Conference matrix ===
This table summarizes the head-to-head results between teams in conference play during the regular season. Records in parentheses are head-to-head results between teams in conference play during the regular season and in the post-season conference tournament.

	Baylor	Iowa State	Kansas	Kansas State	Oklahoma	Oklahoma State	TCU	Texas	Texas Tech	West Virginia
vs. Baylor	—	1–1	2–0	0–2	2–0	0–2	0–2	2–0	1–1	1–1
vs. Iowa State	1–1	—	2–0	1–1	1–1	0–2	0–2	1–1	0–2	1–1
vs. Kansas	0–2	0–2	—	1–1	0–2	1–1	0–2	1–1	0–2	1–1
vs. Kansas State	2–0	1–1	1–1	—	1–1	1–1	0–2	1–1	0–2	1–1
vs. Oklahoma	0–2	1–1	2–0	1–1	—	0–2	0–2	0–2	1–1	1–1
vs. Oklahoma State	2–0	2–0	1–1	1–1	2–0	—	0–2	1–1	1–1	0–2
vs. TCU	2–0	2–0	2–0	2–0	2–0	2–0	—	2–0	2–0	2–0
vs. Texas	0–2	1–1	1–1	1–1	2–0	1–1	0–2	—	1–1	0–2
vs. Texas Tech	1–1	2–0	2–0	2–0	1–1	1–1	0–2	1–1	—	2–0
vs. West Virginia	1–1	1–1	1–1	1–1	1–1	2–0	0–2	2–0	0–2	—
Total	9–9	11–7	14–4	10–8	12–6	8–10	0–18	11–7	6–12	9–9

=== Baylor ===
Date time, TV	Rank^{#}	Opponent^{#}	Result	Record	Site (attendance) city, state
Big 12 Regular Season
01/07/2014; 6:00 pm, ESPN2	No. 7	at No. 9 Iowa State	L 72-87	12–2 (0–1)	Hilton Coliseum (14,383); Ames, IA
01/11/2014; 12:30 pm, B12N	No. 7	TCU	W 88-62	13–2 (1–1)	Ferrell Center (7,573); Waco, TX
01/15/2014; 8:00 pm, ESPNU	No. 12	at Texas Tech	L 72-82	13–3 (1–2)	United Spirit Arena (9,516); Lubbock, TX
01/18/2014; 1:00 pm, ESPN	No. 12	No. 25 Oklahoma	L 64-66	13–4 (1–3)	Ferrell Center (8,544); Waco, TX
01/20/2014; 8:00 pm, ESPN	No. 24	at No. 8 Kansas	L 68-78	13–5 (1–4)	Allen Fieldhouse (16,300); Lawrence, KS
01/25/2014; 12:30 pm, B12N	No. 24	Texas	L 60-74	13–6 (1–5)	Ferrell Center (8,052); Waco, TX
01/28/2014; 6:00 pm, ESPN2		West Virginia	L 64-66	13–7 (1–6)	Ferrell Center (5,529); Waco, TX
02/01/2014; 1:00 pm, ESPN		at No. 8 Oklahoma State	W 76-70	14–7 (2–6)	Gallagher-Iba Arena (11,500); Stillwater, OK
02/04/2014; 6:00 pm, ESPN2		No. 8 Kansas	L 52-69	14–8 (2–7)	Ferrell Center (8,305); Waco, TX
02/08/2014; 6:00 pm, ESPN2		at No. 21 Oklahoma	L 72-88	14–9 (2–8)	Lloyd Noble Center (13,112); Norman, OK
02/12/2014; 6:00 pm, ESPNU		at TCU	W 91-58	15–9 (3–8)	Daniel-Meyer Coliseum (4,705); Fort Worth, TX
02/15/2014; 6:00 pm, ESPNU		Kansas State	W 87-73 ^{2OT}	16–9 (4–8)	Ferrell Center (7,556); Waco, TX
02/17/2014; 8:00 pm, ESPN		Oklahoma State	W 70-64 ^{OT}	17–9 (5–8)	Ferrell Center (6,517); Waco, TX
02/22/2014; 12:30 pm, B12N		at West Virginia	W 88-75	18–9 (6–8)	WVU Coliseum (11,843); Morgantown, WV
02/26/2014; 8:00 pm, ESPNU		at No. 24 Texas	L 69-74	18–10 (6–9)	Frank Erwin Center (12,471); Austin, TX
03/01/2014; 12:30 pm, B12N		Texas Tech	W 59-49	19–10 (7–9)	Ferrell Center (8,827); Waco, TX
03/04/2014; 6:00 pm, ESPN2		No. 16 Iowa State	W 74-61	20–10 (8–9)	Ferrell Center (8,502); Waco, TX
03/08/2014; 12:30 pm, B12N		at Kansas State	W 76-74	21–10 (9–9)	Bramlage Coliseum (12,528); Manhattan, KS
2014 Big 12 Men's Basketball tournament
03/12/2014; 8:30 pm, B12N		vs. (10) TCU; Big 12 Tournament 1st Round	W 76-68	22–10	Sprint Center (18,972); Kansas City, MO
03/13/2014; 6:00 pm, B12N		vs. No. 17 (2) Oklahoma; Big 12 Tournament quarterfinals	W 78-73	23–10	Sprint Center (18,972); Kansas City, MO
03/14/2014; 8:30 pm, ESPNU		vs. (3) Texas; Big 12 Tournament semifinals	W 86-69	24–10	Sprint Center (18,972); Kansas City, MO
03/15/2014; 8:00 pm, ESPN		vs. No. 16 (4) Iowa State; Big 12 tournament championship	L 65-74	24–11	Sprint Center (18,972); Kansas City, MO
*Non-conference game. ^{#}Rankings from AP Poll. (#) Tournament seedings in parentheses. All times are in Central Time.

=== Iowa State ===
Date time, TV	Rank^{#}	Opponent^{#}	Result	Record	Site (attendance) city, state
Big 12 Regular Season
01/04/2014; 12:30 pm, B12N	No. 13	at Texas Tech	W 73-62	13–0 (1–0)	United Spirit Arena (5,861); Lubbock, TX
01/07/2014; 6:00 pm, ESPN2	No. 9	No. 7 Baylor	W 87-72	14–0 (2–0)	Hilton Coliseum (14,383); Ames, IA
01/11/2014; 11:00 am, ESPNU	No. 9	at Oklahoma	L 82-87	14–1 (2–1)	Lloyd Noble Center (11,105); Norman, OK
01/13/2014; 8:00 pm, ESPN	No. 8	No. 15 Kansas	L 70-77	14–2 (2–2)	Hilton Coliseum (14,384); Ames, IA
01/18/2014; 3:00 pm, B12N	No. 8	at Texas	L 76-86	14–3 (2–3)	Frank Erwin Center (12,709); Austin, TX
01/25/2014; 12:30 pm, B12N	No. 16	No. 22 Kansas State	W 81-75	15–3 (3–3)	Hilton Coliseum (14,384); Ames, IA
01/29/2014; 8:00 pm, ESPNU	No. 16	at No. 6 Kansas	L 81-92	15–4 (3–4)	Allen Fieldhouse (16,300); Lawrence, KS
02/01/2014; 3:00 pm, B12N	No. 16	No. 23 Oklahoma	W 81-75	16–4 (4–4)	Hilton Coliseum (14,384); Ames, IA
02/03/2014; 8:00 pm, ESPN	No. 16	at No. 19 Oklahoma State	W 98-97 ^{3OT}	17–4 (5–4)	Gallagher-Iba Arena (10,132); Stillwater, OK
02/08/2014; 3:00 pm, B12N	No. 16	TCU	W 84-69	18–4 (6–4)	Hilton Coliseum (14,384); Ames, IA
02/10/2014; 6:00 pm, ESPNU	No. 11	at West Virginia	L 77-102	18–5 (6–5)	WVU Coliseum (8,177); Morgantown, WV
02/15/2014; 12:30 pm, B12N	No. 11	Texas Tech	W 70-64	19–5 (7–5)	Hilton Coliseum (14,384); Ames, IA
02/18/2014; 6:00 pm, B12N	No. 17	No. 19 Texas	W 85-76	20–5 (8–5)	Hilton Coliseum (14,384); Ames, IA
02/22/2014; 3:00 pm, ESPN2	No. 17	at TCU	W 71-60	21–5 (9–5)	Daniel–Meyer Coliseum (5,778); Fort Worth, TX
02/26/2014; 7:00 pm, B12N	No. 15	West Virginia	W 83-66	22–5 (10–5)	Hilton Coliseum (14,384); Ames, IA
03/01/2014; 6:00 pm, ESPNU	No. 15	at Kansas State	L 73-80	22–6 (10–6)	Bramlage Coliseum (12,528); Manhattan, KS
03/04/2014; 6:00 pm, ESPN2	No. 16	at Baylor	L 61-74	22–7 (10–7)	Ferrell Center (8,502); Waco, TX
03/08/2014; 1:00 pm, ESPN	No. 16	Oklahoma State	W 85-81 ^{OT}	23–7 (11–7)	Hilton Coliseum (14,384); Ames, IA
2014 Big 12 Men's Basketball tournament
03/13/2014; 11:30 am, ESPN2	No. 16	vs. (5) Kansas State; Big 12 Tournament quarterfinals	W 91-85	24–7	Sprint Center (18,972); Kansas City, MO
03/14/2014; 6:00 pm, ESPNU	No. 16	vs. No. 10 (1) Kansas; Big 12 Tournament semifinals	W 94-83	25–7	Sprint Center (18,972); Kansas City, MO
03/15/2014; 8:00 pm, ESPN	No. 16	vs. (7) Baylor; Big 12 tournament championship	W 74-65	26–7	Sprint Center (18,972); Kansas City, MO
*Non-conference game. ^{#}Rankings from AP Poll. (#) Tournament seedings in parentheses. All times are in Central Time.

=== Kansas ===
Date time, TV	Rank^{#}	Opponent^{#}	Result	Record	Site (attendance) city, state
Big 12 Regular Season
01/08/2014; 6:00 pm, ESPN2	No. 18	at Oklahoma	W 90-83	10–4 (1–0)	Lloyd Noble Center (13,127); Norman, Oklahoma
01/11/2014; 1:00 pm, ESPN	No. 18	No. 25 Kansas State	W 86-60	11–4 (2–0)	Allen Fieldhouse (16,300); Lawrence, Kansas
01/13/2014; 8:00 pm, ESPN	No. 15	at No. 8 Iowa State	W 77-70	12–4 (3–0)	Hilton Coliseum (14,384); Ames, Iowa
01/18/2014; 3:00 pm, CBS	No. 15	No. 9 Oklahoma State	W 80-78	13–4 (4–0)	Allen Fieldhouse (16,300); Lawrence, Kansas
01/20/2014; 8:00 pm, ESPN	No. 8	No. 24 Baylor	W 78-68	14–4 (5–0)	Allen Fieldhouse (16,300); Lawrence, Kansas
01/25/2014; 8:00 pm, ESPNU	No. 8	at TCU	W 91-69	15–4 (6–0)	Daniel–Meyer Coliseum (7,494); Ft. Worth, Texas
01/29/2014; 8:00 pm, ESPNU	No. 6	No. 16 Iowa State	W 92-81	16–4 (7–0)	Allen Fieldhouse (16,300); Lawrence, Kansas
02/01/2014; 3:00 pm, ESPN	No. 6	at No. 25 Texas	L 69-81	16–5 (7–1)	Frank Erwin Center (16,540); Austin, Texas
02/04/2014; 6:00 pm, ESPN2	No. 8	at Baylor	W 69-52	17–5 (8–1)	Ferrell Center (8,305); Waco, Texas
02/08/2014; 3:00 pm, ESPN	No. 8	West Virginia	W 83-69	18–5 (9–1)	Allen Fieldhouse (16,300); Lawrence, Kansas
02/10/2014; 8:00 pm, ESPN	No. 7	at Kansas State	L 82-85 ^{OT}	18–6 (9–2)	Bramlage Coliseum (12,528); Manhattan, Kansas
02/15/2014; 3:00 pm, B12N	No. 7	TCU	W 95-65	19–6 (10–2)	Allen Fieldhouse (16,300); Lawrence, Kansas
02/18/2014; 7:00 pm, B12N	No. 8	at Texas Tech	W 64-63	20–6 (11–2)	United Spirit Arena (12,667); Lubbock, Texas
02/22/2014; 6:30 pm, ESPNU	No. 8	No. 19 Texas	W 85-64	21–6 (12–2)	Allen Fieldhouse (16,300); Lawrence, Kansas
02/24/2014; 8:00 pm, ESPN	No. 5	Oklahoma	W 83-75	22–6 (13–2)	Allen Fieldhouse (16,300); Lawrence, Kansas
03/01/2014; 8:00 pm, ESPN	No. 5	at Oklahoma State	L 65-72	22–7 (13–3)	Gallagher-Iba Arena (13,611); Stillwater, Oklahoma
03/05/2014; 7:00 pm, B12N	No. 8	Texas Tech	W 82-57	23–7 (14–3)	Allen Fieldhouse (16,300); Lawrence, Kansas
03/08/2014; 11:00 am, ESPN	No. 8	at West Virginia	L 86-92	23–8 (14–4)	WVU Coliseum (14,038); Morgantown, West Virginia
2014 Big 12 Men's Basketball tournament
03/13/2014; 2:00 pm, ESPN2	No. 10	vs. (8) Oklahoma State; Big 12 Tournament quarterfinals	W 77-70 ^{OT}	24–8	Sprint Center (18,972); Kansas City, MO
03/14/2014; 6:00 pm, ESPNU	No. 10	vs. No. 16 (4) Iowa State; Big 12 Tournament semifinals	L 83-94	24–9	Sprint Center (18,972); Kansas City, MO
*Non-conference game. ^{#}Rankings from AP Poll. (#) Tournament seedings in parentheses. All times are in Central Time.

=== Kansas State ===
Date time, TV	Rank^{#}	Opponent^{#}	Result	Record	Site (attendance) city, state
Big 12 Regular Season
01/04/2014; 3:00 pm, ESPNU		No. 6 Oklahoma State	W 74-71	11–3 (1–0)	Bramlage Coliseum (12,528); Manhattan, KS
01/07/2014; 7:00 pm, B12N	No. 25	at TCU	W 65-47	12–3 (2–0)	Daniel-Meyer Coliseum (4,280); Fort Worth, TX
01/11/2014; 6:00 pm, ESPN	No. 25	at No. 18 Kansas	L 60-86	12–4 (2–1)	Allen Fieldhouse (16,300); Lawrence, KS
01/14/2014; 6:00 pm, ESPN2		No. 25 Oklahoma	W 72-66	13–4 (3–1)	Bramlage Coliseum (12,250); Manhattan, KS
01/18/2014; 12:30 pm, B12N		West Virginia	W 78-56	14–4 (4–1)	Bramlage Coliseum (12,528); Manhattan, KS
01/21/2014; 6:00 pm, ESPN2	No. 22	at Texas	L 64-67	15–4 (4–2)	Frank Erwin Center (8,918); Austin, TX
01/25/2014; 12:30 pm, B12N	No. 22	at No. 16 Iowa State	L 75-81	15–5 (4–3)	Hilton Coliseum (14,384); Ames, IA
01/28/2014; 7:00 pm, B12N		Texas Tech	W 66-58	15–6 (5–3)	Bramlage Coliseum (11,805); Manhattan, KS
02/01/2014; 12:30 pm, B12N		at West Virginia	L 71-81	15–7 (5–4)	WVU Coliseum (10,121); Morgantown, WV
02/08/2014; 12:30 pm, B12N		No. 15 Texas	W 74-57	16–7 (6–4)	Bramlage Coliseum (12,171); Manhattan, KS
02/10/2014; 8:00 pm, ESPN		No. 7 Kansas	W 85-82 ^{OT}	17–7 (7–4)	Bramlage Coliseum (12,528); Manhattan, KS
02/15/2014; 6:00 pm, ESPNU		at Baylor	L 73-87 ^{2OT}	17–8 (7–5)	Ferrell Center (7,556); Waco, TX
02/19/2014; 8:00 pm, ESPNU		TCU	W 65-53	18–8 (8–5)	Bramlage Stadium (11,969); Manhattan, KS
02/22/2014; 3:00 pm, B12N		at Oklahoma	L 73-86	18–9 (8–6)	Lloyd Noble Center (12,925); Norman, OK
02/25/2014; 6:00 pm, ESPN2		at Texas Tech	W 60-56	19–9 (9–6)	United Spirit Arena (12,224); Lubbock, TX
03/01/2014; 6:00 pm, ESPNU		No. 15 Iowa State	W 80-73	20–9 (10–6)	Bramlage Coliseum (12,528); Manhattan, KS
03/03/2014; 8:00 pm, ESPN		at Oklahoma State	L 61-77	20–10 (10–7)	Gallagher-Iba Arena (10,969); Stillwater, OK
03/08/2014; 12:30 pm, B12N		Baylor	L 74-76	20–11 (10–8)	Bramlage Coliseum (12,528); Manhattan, KS
2014 Big 12 Men's Basketball tournament
03/13/2014; 11:30 am, ESPN2		vs. No. 16 (4) Iowa State; Big 12 Tournament quarterfinals	L 85-91	20–12	Sprint Center (18,972); Kansas City, MO
*Non-conference game. ^{#}Rankings from AP Poll. (#) Tournament seedings in parentheses. All times are in Central Time.

=== Oklahoma ===
Date time, TV	Rank^{#}	Opponent^{#}	Result	Record	Site (attendance) city, state
Big 12 Regular Season
01/04/2014; 7:00 pm, LHN		at Texas	W 88-85	12–2 (1–0)	Frank Erwin Center (10,189); Austin, TX
01/08/2014; 6:00 pm, ESPN2		No. 18 Kansas	L 83-90	12–3 (1–1)	Lloyd Noble Center (13,127); Norman, OK
01/11/2014; 11:00 am, ESPNU		No. 9 Iowa State	W 87-82	13–3 (2–1)	Lloyd Noble Center (11,105); Norman, OK
01/14/2014; 6:00 pm, ESPN2	No. 25	at Kansas State	L 66-72	13–4 (2–2)	Bramlage Coliseum (12,250); Manhattan, KS
01/18/2014; 1:00 pm, ESPN	No. 25	at No. 12 Baylor	W 66-64	14–4 (3–2)	Ferrell Center (8,544); Waco, TX
01/22/2014; 8:00 pm, ESPNU	No. 25	TCU	W 77-69	15–4 (4–2)	Lloyd Noble Center (9,854); Norman, OK
01/25/2014; 3:00 pm, B12N	No. 25	at Texas Tech	W 74-65	16–4 (5–2)	United Spirit Arena (9,317); Lubbock, TX
01/27/2014; 8:00 pm, ESPN	No. 23	No. 8 Oklahoma State	W 88–76	17–4 (6–2)	Lloyd Noble Center (13,093); Norman, OK
02/01/2014; 3:00 pm, B12N	No. 23	at No. 16 Iowa State	L 75-81	17–5 (6–3)	Hilton Coliseum (14,384); Ames, IA
02/05/2014; 6:00 pm, ESPNU	No. 21	at West Virginia	L 86-91 ^{OT}	17–6 (6–4)	WVU Coliseum (7,538); Morgantown, WV
02/08/2014; 6:00 pm, ESPN2	No. 21	Baylor	W 88-72	18–6 (7–4)	Lloyd Noble Center (13,112); Norman, OK
02/12/2014; 7:00 pm, B12N		Texas Tech	L 60-68	18–7 (7–5)	Lloyd Noble Center (9,956); Norman, OK
02/15/2014; 1:00 pm, ESPN		at Oklahoma State	W 77-74	19–7 (8–5)	Gallagher-Iba Arena (10,070); Stillwater, OK
02/22/2014; 3:00 pm, B12N		Kansas State	W 86-73	20–7 (9–5)	Lloyd Noble Center (12,925); Norman, OK
02/24/2014; 8:00 pm, ESPN		at No. 5 Kansas	L 75-83	20–8 (9–6)	Allen Fieldhouse (16,300); Lawrence, KS
03/01/2014; 3:00 pm, B12N		No. 24 Texas	W 77-65	21–8 (10–6)	Lloyd Noble Center (12,976); Norman, OK
03/05/2014; 8:00 pm, ESPNU	No. 23	West Virginia	W 72-62	22–8 (11–6)	Lloyd Noble Center (10,674); Norman, OK
03/08/2014; 3:00 pm, B12N	No. 23	at TCU	W 97-67	23–8 (12–6)	Daniel-Meyer Coliseum (4,878); Ft. Worth, TX
2014 Big 12 Men's Basketball tournament
03/13/2014; 6:00 pm, B12N	No. 17	vs. (7) Baylor; Big 12 Tournament quarterfinals	L 73-78	23–9	Sprint Center (18,972); Kansas City, MO
*Non-conference game. ^{#}Rankings from AP Poll. (#) Tournament seedings in parentheses. All times are in Central Time.

=== Oklahoma State ===
Date time, TV	Rank^{#}	Opponent^{#}	Result	Record	Site (attendance) city, state
Big 12 Regular Season
01/04/2014; 3:00 pm, ESPNU	No. 6	at Kansas State	L 71-74	12–2 (0–1)	Bramlage Coliseum (12,528); Manhattan, KS
01/08/2014; 8:00 pm, ESPNU	No. 11	Texas	W 87-74	13–2 (1–1)	Gallagher-Iba Arena (9,068); Stillwater, OK
01/11/2014; 3:00 pm, B12N	No. 11	at West Virginia	W 73-72	14–2 (2–1)	WVU Coliseum (12,078); Morgantown, WV
01/15/2014; 7:00 pm, B12N	No. 9	TCU	W 82-50	15–2 (3–1)	Gallagher-Iba Arena (8,890); Stillwater, OK
01/18/2014; 3:00 pm, CBS	No. 9	at No. 15 Kansas	L 78-80	15–3 (3–2)	Allen Fieldhouse (16,300); Manhattan, KS
01/25/2014; 1:00 pm, ESPN2	No. 11	West Virginia	W 81-75	16–3 (4–2)	Gallagher-Iba Arena (10,011); Stillwater, OK
01/27/2014; 8:00 pm, ESPN	No. 8	at No. 23 Oklahoma	W 88–76	16–4 (4–3)	Lloyd Noble Center (13,093); Norman, OK
02/01/2014; 1:00 pm, ESPN	No. 8	Baylor	L 70-76	16–5 (4–4)	Gallagher-Iba Arena (11,500); Stillwater, OK
02/03/2014; 8:00 pm, ESPN	No. 19	No. 16 Iowa State	L 97-98 ^{3OT}	16–6 (4–5)	Gallagher-Iba Arena (10,132); Stillwater, OK
02/08/2014; 8:30 pm, ESPNU	No. 19	at Texas Tech	L 61-65	16–7 (4–6)	United Spirit Arena (15,098); Lubbock, TX
02/11/2014; 6:00 pm, ESPN2		at No. 19 Texas	L 68-87	16–8 (4–7)	Frank Erwin Center (10,904); Austin, TX
02/15/2014; 1:00 pm, ESPN		Oklahoma	L 74-77	16–9 (4–8)	Gallagher-Iba Arena (10,070); Stillwater, OK
02/17/2014; 8:00 pm, ESPN		at Baylor	L 64-70 ^{OT}	16–10 (4–9)	Ferrell Center (6,517); Waco, TX
02/22/2014; 12:30 pm, B12N		Texas Tech	W 84-62	17–10 (5–9)	Gallagher-Iba Arena (11,539); Stillwater, OK
02/24/2014; 6:00 pm, ESPNU		at TCU	W 76-54	18–10 (6–9)	Daniel-Meyer Coliseum (5,723); Ft. Worth, TX
03/01/2014; 8:00 pm, ESPN		No. 5 Kansas	W 72-65	19–10 (7–9)	Gallagher-Iba Arena (13,611); Stillwater, OK
03/03/2014; 8:00 pm, ESPN		Kansas State	W 77-61	20–10 (8–9)	Gallagher-Iba Arena (10,969); Stillwater, OK
03/08/2014; 1:00 pm, ESPN		at No. 16 Iowa State	L 81-85 ^{OT}	20–11 (8–10)	Hilton Coliseum (14,384); Ames, IA
2014 Big 12 Men's Basketball tournament
03/12/2014; 6:00 pm, B12N		vs. (9) Texas Tech; Big 12 Tournament 1st Round	W 80-62	21–11	Sprint Center (18,972); Kansas City, MO
03/13/2014; 2:00 pm, ESPN2		vs. No. 10 (1) Kansas; Big 12 Tournament quarterfinals	L 70-77 ^{OT}	21–12	Sprint Center (18,972); Kansas City, MO
*Non-conference game. ^{#}Rankings from AP Poll. (#) Tournament seedings in parentheses. All times are in Central Time.

=== TCU ===
Date time, TV	Rank^{#}	Opponent^{#}	Result	Record	Site (attendance) city, state
Big 12 Regular Season
01/04/2014; 3:00 pm, B12N		West Virginia	L 69-74	9–4 (0–1)	Daniel-Meyer Coliseum (5,038); Fort Worth, TX
01/07/2014; 7:00 pm, B12N		No. 25 Kansas State	L 47-65	9–5 (0–2)	Daniel-Meyer Coliseum (4,280); Fort Worth, TX
01/11/2014; 12:30 pm, B12N		at No. 7 Baylor	L 62-86	9–6 (0–3)	Ferrell Center (7,573); Waco, TX
01/15/2014; 7:00 pm, B12N		at No. 9 Oklahoma State	L 50-82	9–7 (0–4)	Gallagher-Iba Arena (8,890); Stillwater, OK
01/18/2014; 5:00 pm, FSSW		Texas Tech	L 49-60	9–8 (0–5)	Daniel-Meyer Coliseum (6,055); Fort Worth, TX
01/22/2014; 8:00 pm, ESPNU		at No. 25 Oklahoma	L 69-77	9–9 (0–6)	Lloyd Noble Center (9,854); Norman, OK
01/25/2014; 8:00 pm, ESPNU		Kansas	L 69-91	9–10 (0–7)	Daniel-Meyer Coliseum (7,494); Fort Worth, TX
02/01/2014; 12:30 pm, B12N		at Texas Tech	L 54-60	9–11 (0–8)	United Spirit Arena (7,365); Lubbock, TX
02/04/2014; 7:00 pm, B12N		No. 15 Texas	L 54-59	9–12 (0–9)	Daniel-Meyer Coliseum (5,233); Fort Worth, TX
02/08/2014; 3:00 pm, B12N		at No. 16 Iowa State	L 69-84	9–13 (0–10)	Hilton Coliseum (14,384); Ames, IA
02/12/2014; 6:00 pm, B12N		Baylor	L 58-91	9–14 (0–11)	Daniel-Meyer Coliseum (4,705); Fort Worth, TX
02/15/2014; 3:00 pm, B12N		at No. 7 Kansas	L 65-95	9–15 (0–12)	Allen Fieldhouse (16,300); Manhattan, KS
02/19/2014; 8:00 pm, ESPNU		at Kansas State	L 53-65	9–16 (0–13)	Bramlage Coliseum (11,969); Manhattan, KS
02/22/2014; 3:00 pm, ESPN2		No. 17 Iowa State	L 60-71	9–17 (0–14)	Daniel-Meyer Coliseum (5,778); Fort Worth, TX
02/24/2014; 6:00 pm, ESPNU		Oklahoma State	L 54-76	9–18 (0–15)	Daniel-Meyer Coliseum (5,723); Fort Worth, TX
03/01/2014; 12:30 pm, Root Sports		at West Virginia	L 58-81	9–19 (0–16)	WVU Coliseum (11,358); Morgantown, WV
03/05/2014; 7:00 pm, LHN		at Texas	L 54-66	9–20 (0–17)	Frank Erwin Center (9,450); Austin, TX
03/08/2014; 3:00 pm, B12N		No. 23 Oklahoma	L 67-97	9–21 (0–18)	Daniel-Meyer Coliseum (4,878); Fort Worth, TX
2014 Big 12 Men's Basketball tournament
03/12/2014; 8:30 pm, B12N		vs. (7) Baylor; Big 12 Tournament 1st Round	L 68-76	9–22	Sprint Center (18,972); Kansas City, MO
*Non-conference game. ^{#}Rankings from AP Poll. (#) Tournament seedings in parentheses. All times are in Central Time.

=== Texas ===
Date time, TV	Rank^{#}	Opponent^{#}	Result	Record	Site (attendance) city, state
Big 12 Regular Season
01/04/2014; 7:00 pm, LHN		Oklahoma	L 85-88	11–3 (0–1)	Frank Erwin Center (10,189); Austin, TX
01/08/2014; 8:00 pm, ESPNU		at No. 11 Oklahoma State	L 74-87	11–4 (0–2)	Gallagher-Iba Arena (9,068); Stillwater, OK
01/11/2014; 7:00 pm, LHN		Texas Tech	W 67-64	12–4 (1–2)	Frank Erwin Center (9,097); Austin, TX
01/15/2014; 6:00 pm, ESPNU		at West Virginia	W 80-69	13–4 (2–2)	WVU Coliseum (8,706); Morgantown, WV
01/18/2014; 3:00 pm, B12N		No. 8 Iowa State	W 86-76	14–4 (3–2)	Frank Erwin Center (12,709); Austin, TX
01/21/2014; 6:00 pm, ESPN2		No. 22 Kansas State	W 67-64	15–4 (4–2)	Frank Erwin Center (8,918); Austin, TX
01/25/2014; 12:45 pm, B12N		at No. 24 Baylor	W 74-60	16–4 (5–2)	Ferrell Center (8,052); Waco, TX
02/01/2014; 3:00 pm, ESPN	No. 25	No. 6 Kansas	W 81-69	17–4 (6–2)	Frank Erwin Center (16,540); Austin, TX
02/04/2014; 7:00 pm, B12N	No. 15	at TCU	W 59-54	18–4 (7–2)	Daniel-Meyer Coliseum (5,533); Ft. Worth, TX
02/08/2014; 12:45 pm, B12N	No. 15	at Kansas State	L 57-74	18–5 (7–3)	Bramlage Coliseum (12,171); Manhattan, KS
02/11/2014; 6:00 pm, ESPN2	No. 19	Oklahoma State	W 87-68	19–5 (8–3)	Frank Erwin Center (10,904); Austin, TX
02/15/2014; 7:00 pm, LHN	No. 19	West Virginia	W 88-71	20–5 (9–3)	Frank Erwin Center (14,735); Austin, TX
02/18/2014; 6:00 pm, ESPN2	No. 19	at No. 17 Iowa State	L 76-85	20–6 (9–4)	Hilton Coliseum (14,384); Ames, IA
02/22/2014; 6:30 pm, ESPNU	No. 19	at No. 8 Kansas	L 54-85	20–7 (9–5)	Allen Fieldhouse (16,300); Lawrence, KS
02/26/2014; 8:00 pm, ESPNU	No. 24	Baylor	W 74-69	21–7 (10–5)	Frank Erwin Center (12,471); Austin, TX
03/01/2014; 3:00 pm, B12N	No. 24	at Oklahoma	L 65-77	21–8 (10–6)	Lloyd Noble Center (12,976); Norman, OK
03/05/2014; 7:00 pm, LHN		TCU	W 66-54	22–8 (11–6)	Frank Erwin Center (9,450); Austin, TX
03/08/2014; 3:00 pm, ESPNews		at Texas Tech	L 53-59	22–9 (11–7)	United Spirit Arena (12,429); Lubbock, TX
2014 Big 12 Men's Basketball tournament
03/13/2014; 8:30 pm, B12N		vs. (6) West Virginia; Big 12 Tournament quarterfinals	W 66-49	23–9	Sprint Center (18,972); Kansas City, MO
03/14/2014; 8:30 pm, ESPNU		vs. (7) Baylor; Big 12 Tournament semifinals	L 69-86	23–10	Sprint Center (18,972); Kansas City, MO
*Non-conference game. ^{#}Rankings from AP Poll. (#) Tournament seedings in parentheses. All times are in Central Time.

=== Texas Tech ===
Date time, TV	Rank^{#}	Opponent^{#}	Result	Record	Site (attendance) city, state
Big 12 Regular Season
01/04/2014; 12:30 pm, B12N		No. 13 Iowa State	L 62-73	8–6 (0–1)	United Spirit Arena (5,861); Lubbock, TX
01/06/2014; 6:00 pm, ESPNU		West Virginia	L 86-89 ^{OT}	8–7 (0–2)	United Spirit Arena (5,005); Lubbock, TX
01/11/2014; 7:00 pm, LHN		at Texas	L 64-67	8–8 (0–3)	Frank Erwin Center (9,097); Austin, TX
01/15/2014; 8:00 pm, ESPNU		No. 12 Baylor	W 82-72	9–8 (1–3)	United Spirit Arena (9,516); Lubbock, TX
01/18/2014; 5:00 pm, FSSW		at TCU	W 60-49	10–8 (2–3)	Daniel-Meyer Coliseum (6,055); Ft. Worth, TX
01/22/2014; 7:00 pm, B12N		at West Virginia	L 81-87	10–9 (2–4)	WVU Coliseum (5,031); Morgantown, WV
01/25/2014; 3:00 pm, B12N		No. 25 Oklahoma	L 65-74	10–10 (2–5)	United Spirit Arena (9,317); Lubbock, TX
01/28/2014; 7:00 pm, B12N		at Kansas State	L 58-66	10–11 (2–6)	Bramlage Coliseum (11,805); Manhattan, KS
02/01/2014; 12:30 pm, B12N		TCU	W 60-54	11–11 (3–6)	United Spirit Arena (7,365); Lubbock, TX
02/08/2014; 8:30 pm, ESPNU		No. 19 Oklahoma State	W 65-61	12–11 (4–6)	United Spirit Arena (15,098); Lubbock, TX
02/12/2014; 7:00 pm, B12N		at Oklahoma	W 68-60	13–11 (5–6)	Lloyd Noble Center (9,956); Norman, OK
02/15/2014; 12:30 pm, B12N		at No. 11 Iowa State	L 64-70	13–12 (5–7)	Hilton Coliseum (14,384); Ames, IA
02/18/2014; 7:00 pm, B12N		No. 8 Kansas	L 63-64	13–13 (5–8)	United Spirit Arena (12,667); Lubbock, TX
02/22/2014; 12:30 pm, B12N		at Oklahoma State	L 62-84	13–14 (5–9)	Gallagher-Iba Arena (11,539); Stillwater, OK
02/25/2014; 6:00 pm, ESPN2		Kansas State	L 56-60	13–15 (5–10)	United Spirit Arena (12,224); Lubbock, TX
03/01/2014; 12:30 pm, B12N		at Baylor	L 49-59	13–16 (5–11)	Ferrell Center (8,827); Waco, TX
03/05/2014; 7:00 pm, B12N		at No. 8 Kansas	L 57-82	13–17 (5–12)	Allen Fieldhouse (16,300); Manhattan, KS
03/08/2014; 3:00 pm, ESPNews		Texas	W 59-53	14–17 (6–12)	United Spirit Arena (12,429); Lubbock, TX
2014 Big 12 Men's Basketball tournament
03/12/2014; 6:00 pm, B12N		vs. (8) Oklahoma State; Big 12 Tournament 1st Round	L 62-80	14–18	Sprint Center (18,972); Kansas City, MO
*Non-conference game. ^{#}Rankings from AP Poll. (#) Tournament seedings in parentheses. All times are in Central Time.

=== West Virginia ===
Date time, TV	Rank^{#}	Opponent^{#}	Result	Record	Site (attendance) city, state
Big 12 Regular Season
01/04/2014; 4:00 pm, B12N		at TCU	W 74-69	9–5 (1–0)	Daniel-Meyer Coliseum (5,038); Ft. Worth, TX
01/06/2014; 7:00 pm, ESPNU		at Texas Tech	W 89-86 ^{OT}	10–5 (2–0)	United Spirit Arena (5,005); Lubbock, TX
01/11/2014; 4:00 pm, B12N		No. 11 Oklahoma State	L 72-73	10–6 (2–1)	WVU Coliseum (12,078); Morgantown, WV
01/13/2014; 7:00 pm, ESPNU		Texas	L 69-80	10–7 (2–2)	WVU Coliseum (8,706); Morgantown, WV
01/18/2014; 1:30 pm, B12N		at Kansas State	L 56-78	10–8 (2–3)	Bramlage Coliseum (12,528); Manhattan, KS
01/22/2014; 8:00 pm, B12N		Texas Tech	W 87-81	11–8 (3–3)	WVU Coliseum (5,031); Morgantown, WV
01/25/2014; 2:00 pm, ESPN2		at No. 11 Oklahoma State	L 75-81	11–9 (3–4)	Gallagher-Iba Arena (10,011); Stillwater, OK
01/28/2014; 7:00 pm, ESPN2		at Baylor	W 66-64	12–9 (4–4)	Ferrell Center (5,529); Waco, TX
02/01/2014; 1:30 pm, B12N		Kansas State	W 81-71	13–9 (5–4)	WVU Coliseum (10,121); Morgantown, WV
02/05/2014; 7:00 pm, ESPNU		No. 21 Oklahoma	W 91-86 ^{OT}	14–9 (6–4)	WVU Coliseum (7,538); Morgantown, WV
02/08/2014; 4:00 pm, ESPN		at No. 8 Kansas	L 69-83	14–10 (6–5)	Allen Fieldhouse (16,300); Lawrence, KS
02/10/2014; 7:00 pm, ESPNU		No. 11 Iowa State	W 102-77	15–10 (7–5)	WVU Coliseum (8,177); Morgantown, WV
02/15/2014; 8:00 pm, LHN		at No. 19 Texas	L 71-88	15–11 (7–6)	Frank Erwin Center (14,735); Austin, TX
02/22/2014; 1:30 pm, B12N		Baylor	L 75-88	15–12 (7–7)	WVU Coliseum (11,843); Morgantown, WV
02/26/2014; 8:00 pm, B12N		at No. 15 Iowa State	L 66-83	15–13 (7–8)	Hilton Coliseum (14,384); Ames, IA
03/01/2014; 1:30 pm, Root Sports		TCU	W 81-59	16–13 (8–8)	WVU Coliseum (11,358); Morgantown, WV
03/05/2014; 9:00 pm, ESPNU		at No. 23 Oklahoma	L 62-72	16–14 (8–9)	Lloyd Noble Center (10,674); Norman, OK
03/08/2014; 12:00 pm, ESPN		No. 8 Kansas	W 92-86	17–14 (9–9)	WVU Coliseum (14,038); Morgantown, WV
2014 Big 12 Men's Basketball tournament
03/13/2014; 9:30 pm, B12N		vs. (3) Texas; Big 12 Tournament quarterfinals	L 49-66	17–15	Sprint Center (18,972); Kansas City, MO
*Non-conference game. ^{#}Rankings from AP Poll. (#) Tournament seedings in parentheses. All times are in Eastern Time.

== Postseason ==
=== Big 12 tournament ===
- March 12–15, 2014–Big 12 Conference Basketball Tournament, Sprint Center, Kansas City, MO.

2013 Big 12 men's basketball tournament seeds and results
Seed	School	Conf.	Over.	Tiebreaker	First Round March 12	Quarterfinals March 13	Semifinals March 14	Championship March 15
1.	‡† Kansas	14–4	23–8		Bye	#8 Oklahoma State	#4 Iowa State	
2.	† Oklahoma	12–6	23–8		Bye	#7 Baylor		
3.	† Texas	11–7	22–9	1–1 vs ISU; 1–1 vs KU	Bye	#6 West Virginia	#7 Baylor	
4.	† Iowa State	11–7	23–7	1–1 vs UT; 0–2 vs KU	Bye	#5 Kansas State	#1 Kansas	#7 Baylor
5.	† Kansas State	10–8	20–11		Bye	#4 Iowa State		
6.	† West Virginia	9–9	17–14	1–1 vs BU; 1–1 vs KU	Bye	#3 Texas		
7.	Baylor	9–9	21–10	1–1 vs WVU; 0–2 vs KU	#10 TCU	#2 Oklahoma	#3 Texas	#4 Iowa State
8.	Oklahoma State	8–10	20–11		#9 Texas Tech	#1 Kansas		
9.	Texas Tech	6–12	14–17		#8 Oklahoma State			
10.	TCU	0–18	9–21		#7 Baylor			
‡ – Big 12 regular season champions, and tournament No. 1 seed. † – Received a single-bye in the conference tournament. Overall records include all games played in the Big 12 tournament.

==== Bracket ====
First round Wednesday, March 12
8	Oklahoma State	80
9	Texas Tech	62
7	Baylor	76
10	TCU	68

Quarterfinals; Thursday, March 13
1	Kansas	77*
8	Oklahoma State	70
4	Iowa State	91
5	Kansas State	85
3	Texas	66
6	West Virginia	49
2	Oklahoma	73
7	Baylor	78

Semifinals; Friday, March 14
1	Kansas	83
4	Iowa State	94
3	Texas	69
7	Baylor	86

Championship; Saturday, March 15
4	Iowa State	74
7	Baylor	65

* denotes overtime game

=== NCAA tournament ===
Seed	Region	School	Second Round	Third Round	Sweet 16	Elite Eight	Final Four	Championship
2	East	Kansas	#15 Eastern Kentuck - March 21, Saint Louis - W, 80–69	#10 Stanford - March 23, Saint Louis - L, 57–60				
3	East	Iowa State	#14 North Carolina Central - March 21, San Antonio - W, 93–75	#6 North Carolina - March 23, San Antonio - W, 85–83	#7 Connecticut - March 28, New York - L, 76–81			
5	West	Oklahoma	#12 North Dakota State - March 20, Spokane - L, 75–80^{OT}					
6	West	Baylor	#11 Nebraska - March 21, San Antonio - W, 74–60	#3 Creighton - March 23, San Antonio - W, 85–55	#2 Wisconsin - March 27, Anaheim - L, 52–69			
7	Midwest	Texas	#10 Arizona State - March 20, Milwaukee - W, 87–85	#2 Michigan - March 22, Milwaukee - L, 65–79				
9	Midwest	Kansas State	#8 Kentucky - March 21, Saint Louis - L, 49–56					
9	West	Oklahoma State	#8 Gonzaga - March 21, San Diego - L, 77–85					
	7 Bids	W-L (%):	4–3 .571	2–2 .500	0–2 .000	0–0 .000	0–0 .000	TOTAL: 6–7 .462

=== National Invitation tournament ===
Seed	Bracket	School	First Round	Second Round	Quarterfinals	Semifinals	Finals
5	Florida State	West Virginia	#4 Georgetown - March 18, Washington, D.C. - L, 65–77				
	1 Bid	W-L (%):	0–1 .000	0–0 .000	0–0 .000	0–0 .000	TOTAL: 0–1 .000
