= 2013–14 Texas Longhorns men's basketball team =

American college basketball season

2013–14 Texas Longhorns men's basketball

NCAA tournament, Round of 32
- Conference: Big 12
- Record: 24–11 (11–7 Big 12)
- Head coach: Rick Barnes (16th season)
- Assistant coaches: Rob Lanier; Russell Springmann; Chris Ogden
- Home arena: Frank Erwin Center

2013–14 Big 12 men's basketball standings
	Conf.				Overall
Team	W		L	PCT	W		L	PCT
No. 10 Kansas	14	–	4	.778	25	–	10	.714
No. 21 Oklahoma	12	–	6	.667	23	–	10	.697
Texas	11	–	7	.611	24	–	11	.686
No. 9 Iowa State †	11	–	7	.611	28	–	8	.778
Kansas State	10	–	8	.556	20	–	13	.606
West Virginia	9	–	9	.500	17	–	16	.515
No. 23 Baylor	9	–	9	.500	26	–	12	.684
Oklahoma State	8	–	10	.444	21	–	13	.618
Texas Tech	6	–	12	.333	14	–	18	.438
TCU	0	–	18	.000	9	–	22	.290
† 2014 Big 12 Tournament winner Rankings from AP poll

The 2013–14 Texas Longhorns men's basketball team represented the University of Texas at Austin in the 2013–14 NCAA Division I men's basketball season. Their head coach was Rick Barnes, who was in his 16th year as head coach. The team played their home games at the Frank Erwin Center in Austin, Texas and were members of the Big 12 Conference. They finished the season 24–11, 10–6 in Big 12 play to finish in a tie for third place. They advanced to the semifinals of the Big 12 tournament where they lost to Baylor. They received an at-large bid to the NCAA tournament where they defeated Arizona State in the second round before losing in the third round to Michigan.

== Before the season ==
=== Departures ===
Name	Number	Pos.	Height	Weight	Year	Hometown	Notes
Dean Melchionni	0	G	6'4"	193	Senior	Lancaster, Pennsylvania	Graduated
Sheldon McClellan	1	G	6'4"	188	Sophomore	Houston, Texas	Transferred
Jaylen Bond	5	F	6'7"	224	Sophomore	Maroua, Cameroon	Transferred to Temple
Myck Kabongo	12	F	6'1"	169	Sophomore	Toronto, Ontario, Canada	Entered 2013 NBA draft
Julien Lewis	14	G	6'3"	190	Sophomore	Galveston, Texas	Transferred
Andrew Dick	22	G	6'2"	180	Senior	Sherman, Texas	Graduated
Ioannis Papapetrou	33	F	6'8"	225	Freshman	Athens, Greece	Signed a professional contract with Olympiacos

=== Recruiting ===
College recruiting information
Name	Hometown	School	Height	Weight	Commit date
Demarcus Croaker; G	Orlando, FL	Jones	6 ft 3 in (1.91 m)	180 lb (82 kg)	Mar 19, 2013
Demarcus Croaker; G	Recruit ratings: Scout: Rivals: (79)				
Isaiah Taylor; G	Houston, TX	The Village	6 ft 2 in (1.88 m)	175 lb (79 kg)	Jan 4, 2013
Isaiah Taylor; G	Recruit ratings: Scout: Rivals: (78)				
Martez Walker; G	Detroit, MI	Pershing	6 ft 5 in (1.96 m)	195 lb (88 kg)	Apr 30, 2013
Martez Walker; G	Recruit ratings: Scout: Rivals: (77)				
Kendal Yancy-Harris; G	Richardson, TX	Berkner	6 ft 4 in (1.93 m)	195 lb (88 kg)	Mar 30, 2013
Kendal Yancy-Harris; G	Recruit ratings: Scout: Rivals: (82)				
Overall recruit ranking: Scout: NR Rivals: NR ESPN: NR
Note: In many cases, Scout, Rivals, 247Sports, On3, and ESPN may conflict in their listings of height and weight.; In these cases, the average was taken. ESPN grades are on a 100-point scale.; Sources: "Texas 2013 Basketball Commitments". Rivals.; "2013 Texas Basketball Commits". Scout.; "ESPN". ESPN.; "Scout.com Team Recruiting Rankings". Scout.; "2013 Team Ranking". Rivals.

== Schedule ==
Date time, TV	Rank^{#}	Opponent^{#}	Result	Record	Site (attendance) city, state
Non-conference regular season
11/08/2013*; 7:00 pm, LHN		Mercer	W 76–73	1–0	Frank Erwin Center (8,108); Austin, TX
11/12/2013*; 7:00 pm, LHN		South Alabama; CBE Classic Opening Round	W 84–77	2–0	Frank Erwin Center (7,193); Austin, TX
11/15/2013*; 7:00 pm, LHN		Stephen F. Austin	W 72–62	3–0	Frank Erwin Center (7,348); Austin, TX
11/18/2013*; 7:00 pm, LHN		Houston Baptist; CBE Classic	W 89–61	4–0	Frank Erwin Center (6,943); Austin, TX
11/25/2013*; 6:30 pm, ESPNU		vs. BYU; CBE Classic semifinals	L 82–86	4–1	Sprint Center (7,682); Kansas City, MO
11/26/2013*; 6:30 pm, ESPNU		vs. DePaul; CBE Classic consolation round	W 77–59	5–1	Sprint Center (8,324); Kansas City, MO
11/29/2013*; 7:00 pm, LHN		Texas–Arlington	W 72–69	6–1	Frank Erwin Center (7,749); Austin, TX
12/02/2013*; 9:00 pm, ESPN2		Vanderbilt; Big 12/SEC Challenge	W 70–64	7–1	Frank Erwin Center (7,431); Austin, TX
12/07/2013*; 11:00 am, ESPNU		at Temple	W 81–80 ^{OT}	8–1	Wells Fargo Center (6,092); Philadelphia, PA
12/14/2013*; 7:00 pm, LHN		Texas State	W 85–53	9–1	Frank Erwin Center (9,534); Austin, TX
12/18/2013*; 6:00 pm, ESPN2		at No. 14 North Carolina	W 86–83	10–1	Dean Smith Center (17,143); Chapel Hill, NC
12/21/2013*; 3:00 pm, CBS		No. 5 Michigan State	L 78–92	10–2	Frank Erwin Center (15,832); Austin, TX
12/30/2013*; 1:00 pm, LHN		Rice	W 66–44	11–2	Frank Erwin Center (8,199); Austin, TX
Conference season
01/04/2014; 7:00 pm, LHN		Oklahoma	L 85–88	11–3 (0–1)	Frank Erwin Center (10,189); Austin, TX
01/08/2014; 8:00 pm, ESPNU		at No. 11 Oklahoma State	L 74–87	11–4 (0–2)	Gallagher-Iba Arena (9,068); Stillwater, OK
01/11/2014; 7:00 pm, LHN		Texas Tech	W 67–64	12–4 (1–2)	Frank Erwin Center (9,097); Austin, TX
01/13/2014; 6:00 pm, ESPNU		at West Virginia	W 80–69	13–4 (2–2)	WVU Coliseum (8,706); Morgantown, WV
01/18/2014; 3:00 pm, ESPN3		No. 8 Iowa State	W 86–76	14–4 (3–2)	Frank Erwin Center (12,709); Austin, TX
01/21/2014; 6:00 pm, ESPN2		No. 22 Kansas State	W 67–64	15–4 (4–2)	Frank Erwin Center (8,918); Austin, TX
01/25/2014; 12:45 pm, B12N		at No. 24 Baylor	W 74–60	16–4 (5–2)	Ferrell Center (8,052); Waco, TX
02/01/2014; 3:00 pm, ESPN	No. 25	No. 6 Kansas	W 81–69	17–4 (6–2)	Frank Erwin Center (16,540); Austin, TX
02/04/2014; 7:00 pm, B12N	No. 15	at TCU	W 59–54	18–4 (7–2)	Daniel-Meyer Coliseum (5,233); Ft. Worth, TX
02/08/2014; 12:45 pm, B12N	No. 15	at Kansas State	L 57–74	18–5 (7–3)	Bramlage Coliseum (12,171); Manhattan, KS
02/11/2014; 6:00 pm, ESPN2	No. 19	Oklahoma State	W 87–68	19–5 (8–3)	Frank Erwin Center (10,904); Austin, TX
02/15/2014; 7:00 pm, LHN	No. 19	West Virginia	W 88–71	20–5 (9–3)	Frank Erwin Center (12,179); Austin, TX
02/18/2014; 6:00 pm, ESPN2	No. 19	at No. 17 Iowa State	L 76–85	20–6 (9–4)	Hilton Coliseum (14,384); Ames, IA
02/22/2014; 6:30 pm, ESPNU	No. 19	at No. 8 Kansas	L 54–85	20–7 (9–5)	Allen Fieldhouse (16,300); Lawrence, KS
02/26/2014; 8:00 pm, ESPNU	No. 24	Baylor	W 74–69	21–7 (10–5)	Frank Erwin Center (12,471); Austin, TX
03/01/2014; 3:00 pm, B12N	No. 24	at Oklahoma	L 65–77	21–8 (10–6)	Lloyd Noble Center (12,976); Norman, OK
03/05/2014; 7:00 pm, LHN		TCU	W 66–54	22–8 (11–6)	Frank Erwin Center (9,450); Austin, TX
03/08/2014; 3:00 pm, ESPNews		at Texas Tech	L 53–59	22–9 (11–7)	United Spirit Arena (12,429); Lubbock, TX
Big 12 Tournament
03/13/2014; 8:30 pm, B12N		vs. West Virginia; Quarterfinals	W 66–49	23–9	Sprint Center (18,972); Kansas City, MO
03/14/2014; 8:30 pm, ESPNU		vs. Baylor; Semifinals	L 69–86	23–10	Sprint Center (18,972); Kansas City, MO
NCAA tournament
03/20/2014*; 8:40 pm, CBS	No. (MW 7)	vs. (MW 10) Arizona State; Second round	W 87–85	24–10	BMO Harris Bradley Center (17,331); Milwaukee, WI
03/22/2014*; 4:15 pm, CBS	No. (MW 7)	vs. No. 7 (MW 2) Michigan; Third round	L 65–79	24–11	BMO Harris Bradley Center (18,206); Milwaukee, WI
*Non-conference game. ^{#}Rankings from AP Poll / Coaches' Poll. (#) Tournament seedings in parentheses. All times are in Central Time. For NCAA tournament (#) is seed within region MW=Midwest.

== Roster ==
2013–14 Texas Longhorns men's basketball team
Players
Coaches

Pos.	#	Name	Height	Weight	Year	Previous school	Hometown
G	0	Kendall Yancy	6 ft 3 in (1.91 m)	200 lb (91 kg)	Fr	Berkner	Richardson, TX
G	1	Isaiah Taylor	6 ft 1 in (1.85 m)	170 lb (77 kg)	Fr	The Village School	Hayward, CA
G	2	Demarcus Holland	6 ft 2 in (1.88 m)	185 lb (84 kg)	So	Naaman Forest	Garland, TX
G	3	Javan Felix	5 ft 11 in (1.8 m)	195 lb (88 kg)	So	St. Augustine	New Orleans, LA
F	4	Danny Newsome	6 ft 9 in (2.06 m)	190 lb (86 kg)	RS Fr	Langham Creek	Houston, TX
F	10	Jonathan Holmes	6 ft 8 in (2.03 m)	240 lb (109 kg)	Jr	Antonian College Prep	San Antonio, TX
F	21	Connor Lammert	6 ft 9 in (2.06 m)	235 lb (107 kg)	So	Churchill	San Antonio, TX
G	24	Martez Walker	6 ft 4 in (1.93 m)	185 lb (84 kg)	Fr	Pershing	Detroit, MI
F	30	Ryan McClurg	6 ft 5 in (1.96 m)	225 lb (102 kg)	Fr	Seven Lakes	Katy, TX
G	40	Tarale Murry (W)	6 ft 2 in (1.88 m)	187 lb (85 kg)	Jr	Lehman	San Antonio, TX
C	44	Prince Ibeh	6 ft 10 in (2.08 m)	250 lb (113 kg)	So	Naaman Forest	Garland, TX
F	52	Brandon Allums (W)	6 ft 4 in (1.93 m)	241 lb (109 kg)	So	Plano West	Plano, TX
C	55	Cameron Ridley	6 ft 9 in (2.06 m)	285 lb (129 kg)	So	Bush	Richmond, TX

Head coach

- Rick Barnes (Lenoir–Rhyne)

Assistant coach(es)

- Rob Lanier (St. Bonaventure)
- Russell Springmann (Salisbury)
- Christopher Ogden (Texas)

Legend

- (C) Team captain
- (S) Suspended
- (I) Ineligible
- (W) Walk-on
- Injured
- Current redshirt

Roster
Last update: 2014-02-17
