= 2013–14 Baylor Bears basketball team =

American college basketball season

2013–14 Baylor Bears men's basketball

NCAA tournament, Sweet Sixteen
- Conference: Big 12 Conference

Ranking
- Coaches: No. 18т
- AP: No. 23
- Record: 26–12 (9–9 Big 12)
- Head coach: Scott Drew (11th season)
- Assistant coaches: Jerome Tang; Grant McCasland; Paul Mills
- Home arena: Ferrell Center

2013–14 Big 12 men's basketball standings
	Conf.				Overall
Team	W		L	PCT	W		L	PCT
No. 10 Kansas	14	–	4	.778	25	–	10	.714
No. 21 Oklahoma	12	–	6	.667	23	–	10	.697
Texas	11	–	7	.611	24	–	11	.686
No. 9 Iowa State †	11	–	7	.611	28	–	8	.778
Kansas State	10	–	8	.556	20	–	13	.606
West Virginia	9	–	9	.500	17	–	16	.515
No. 23 Baylor	9	–	9	.500	26	–	12	.684
Oklahoma State	8	–	10	.444	21	–	13	.618
Texas Tech	6	–	12	.333	14	–	18	.438
TCU	0	–	18	.000	9	–	22	.290
† 2014 Big 12 Tournament winner Rankings from AP poll

The 2013–14 Baylor Bears basketball team represented Baylor University in the 2013–14 NCAA Division I men's basketball season. This was head coach Scott Drew's eleventh season at Baylor. The Bears competed in the Big 12 Conference and played their home games at the Ferrell Center. They finished the season 26–12, 9–9 in Big 12 play to finish in a tie for sixth place. They advanced to the championship game of the Big 12 tournament where they lost to Iowa State. They received an at-large bid to the NCAA tournament where they defeated Nebraska and Creighton to advance to the Sweet Sixteen where they lost to Wisconsin.

== Pre-season ==
=== Departures ===
Name	Number	Pos.	Height	Weight	Year	Hometown	Notes
J'mison Morgan	11	F/C	6'11"	250	Senior	Dallas, Texas	Graduated
Deuce Bello	14	G	6'4"	185	Sophomore	Greensboro, North Carolina	Transferred to Missouri
A. J. Walton	22	G	6'1"	185	Senior	Little Rock, Arkansas	Graduated
Jacob Neubert	23	F	6'5"	200	Senior	Waco, Texas	Graduated
Pierre Jackson	55	G	5'10"	180	Senior	Las Vegas, Nevada	Graduated; Entered 2013 NBA draft; Selected 2nd Round, Pick #42 by Philadelphia 76ers

== Roster ==
2013–14 Baylor Bears men's basketball team
Players
Coaches

Pos.	#	Name	Height	Weight	Year	Previous school	Hometown
F	00	Royce O'Neale	6 ft 6 in (1.98 m)	220 lb (100 kg)	Jr	Harker Heights; Denver	Killeen, TX
G	1	Kenny Chery	5 ft 11 in (1.8 m)	180 lb (82 kg)	Jr	Archbishop Carroll (D.C.); State Fair CC	Montreal
F	2	Rico Gathers	6 ft 8 in (2.03 m)	270 lb (122 kg)	So	Riverside Academy	LaPlace, LA
G	4	Gary Franklin	6 ft 2 in (1.88 m)	190 lb (86 kg)	RS Sr	Mater Dei; California	Santa Ana, CA
G	5	Brady Heslip	6 ft 2 in (1.88 m)	180 lb (82 kg)	RS Sr	New Hampton Prep; Boston College	Burlington, ON
F	12	Johnathan Motley	6 ft 9 in (2.06 m)	210 lb (95 kg)	Fr	North Shore	Houston, TX
F/C	15	Chad Rykhoek	6 ft 11 in (2.11 m)	230 lb (104 kg)	RS Fr	Ft. Worth Christian	Ft. Worth, TX
F	20	Logan Lowery	6 ft 6 in (1.98 m)	190 lb (86 kg)	RS Jr	Kingwood; Centenary	Kingwood, TX
C	21	Isaiah Austin	7 ft 1 in (2.16 m)	225 lb (102 kg)	So	Grace Prep	Arlington, TX
G/F	24	Ish Wainright	6 ft 5 in (1.96 m)	245 lb (111 kg)	Fr	Montrose Christian (MD)	Kansas City, MO
F	25	Allerik Freeman	6 ft 3 in (1.91 m)	200 lb (91 kg)	Fr	Findlay Prep	Charlotte, NC
F	34	Cory Jefferson	6 ft 9 in (2.06 m)	220 lb (100 kg)	Sr	Killeen	Killeen, TX
F	35	Taurean Prince	6 ft 7 in (2.01 m)	205 lb (93 kg)	So	Earl Warren	San Antonio, TX

Head coach

- Scott Drew (Butler)

Assistant coach(es)

- Jerome Tang (Charter Oak State)
- Grant McCasland (Baylor)
- Paul Mills (Texas A&M)

Legend

- (C) Team captain
- (S) Suspended
- (I) Ineligible
- (W) Walk-on
- Injured
- Current redshirt

== Rankings ==
Ranking movement Legend: ██ Improvement in ranking. ██ Decrease in ranking. RV=Received votes.
Poll	Pre	2	3	4	5	6	7	8	9	10	11	12	13	14	15	16	17	18	19	20	Final
AP	25	23	20	18	20	14	12	11	9	7	12	24	NR	NR	NR	NR	NR	NR	RV	23	N/A
Coaches	RV	25	21	17	20	18	15	12	11	9	13	23	RV	NR	NR	NR	RV	NR	RV	RV	18т

== Schedule and results ==
Date time, TV	Rank^{#}	Opponent^{#}	Result	Record	Site (attendance) city, state
Non-conference regular season
11/08/2013*; 9:00 pm, FSSW	No. 25	vs. Colorado	W 72–60	1–0	American Airlines Center (5,207); Dallas, TX
11/12/2013*; 2:00 pm, ESPN	No. 23	South Carolina; ESPN Tip-Off Marathon	W 66–64	2–0	Ferrell Center (5,706); Waco, TX
11/17/2013*; 4:00 pm, FSSW	No. 23	Louisiana–Lafayette; Maui on the Mainland	W 87–68	3–0	Ferrell Center (5,290); Waco, TX
11/20/2013*; 6:00 pm, FSSW	No. 20	Charleston Southern	W 69–64	4–0	Ferrell Center (5,185); Waco, TX
11/25/2013*; 8:30 pm, ESPNU	No. 18	at Chaminade; Maui Invitational 1st Round	W 93–77	5–0	Lahaina Civic Center (2,400); Maui, HI
11/26/2013*; 8:30 pm, ESPN	No. 18	vs. Dayton; Maui Invitational Semifinals	W 67–66	6–0	Lahaina Civic Center (2,400); Maui, HI
11/27/2013*; 9:00 pm, ESPN	No. 18	vs. No. 8 Syracuse; Maui Invitational Championship	L 67–74	6–1	Lahaina Civic Center (2,400); Maui, HI
12/01/2013*; 2:00 pm, FSSW	No. 18	Hardin–Simmons	W 104–59	7–1	Ferrell Center (5,159); Waco, TX
12/06/2013*; 8:00 pm, ESPN	No. 20	vs. No. 3 Kentucky; Big 12/SEC Challenge	W 67–62	8–1	AT&T Stadium (12,818); Arlington, TX
12/18/2013*; 8:30 pm, FSSW+	No. 12	Northwestern State	W 91–84 ^{OT}	9–1	Ferrell Center (5,667); Waco, TX
12/22/2013*; 4:00 pm, FSSW	No. 12	Southern	W 81–56	10–1	Ferrell Center (5,562); Waco, TX
12/30/2013*; 7:00 pm, FSSW+	No. 9	Oral Roberts	W 81–55	11–1	Ferrell Center (8,037); Waco, TX
01/03/2014*; 7:00 pm, FSSW+	No. 9	Savannah State	W 80–50	12–1	Ferrell Center (5,685); Waco, TX
Big 12 regular season
01/07/2014; 6:00 pm, ESPN2	No. 7	at No. 9 Iowa State	L 72–87	12–2 (0–1)	Hilton Coliseum (14,384); Ames, IA
01/11/2014; 12:30 pm, B12N	No. 7	TCU	W 88–62	13–2 (1–1)	Ferrell Center (7,573); Waco, TX
01/15/2014; 8:00 pm, ESPNU	No. 12	at Texas Tech	L 72–82	13–3 (1–2)	United Spirit Arena (9,516); Lubbock, TX
01/18/2014; 1:00 pm, ESPN	No. 12	No. 25 Oklahoma	L 64–66	13–4 (1–3)	Ferrell Center (8,544); Waco, TX
01/20/2014; 8:00 pm, ESPN	No. 24	at No. 8 Kansas	L 68–78	13–5 (1–4)	Allen Fieldhouse (16,300); Lawrence, KS
01/25/2014; 12:30 pm, B12N	No. 24	Texas	L 60–74	13–6 (1–5)	Ferrell Center (8,052); Waco, TX
01/28/2014; 6:00 pm, ESPN2		West Virginia	L 64–66	13–7 (1–6)	Ferrell Center (5,529); Waco, TX
02/01/2014; 1:00 pm, ESPN		at No. 8 Oklahoma State	W 76–70	14–7 (2–6)	Gallagher-Iba Arena (11,500); Stillwater, OK
02/04/2014; 6:00 pm, ESPN2		No. 8 Kansas	L 52–69	14–8 (2–7)	Ferrell Center (8,305); Waco, TX
02/08/2014; 6:00 pm, ESPN2		at No. 21 Oklahoma	L 72–88	14–9 (2–8)	Lloyd Noble Center (13,112); Norman, OK
02/12/2014; 6:00 pm, ESPNU		at TCU	W 91–58	15–9 (3–8)	Daniel-Meyer Coliseum (4,705); Fort Worth, TX
02/15/2014; 6:00 pm, ESPNU		Kansas State	W 87–73 ^{2OT}	16–9 (4–8)	Ferrell Center (7,556); Waco, TX
02/17/2014; 6:00 pm, ESPN		Oklahoma State	W 70-64 ^{OT}	17–9 (5–8)	Ferrell Center (6,517); Waco, TX
02/22/2014; 12:30 pm, B12N		at West Virginia	W 88-75	18–9 (6–8)	WVU Coliseum (11,843); Morgantown, WV
02/26/2014; 8:00 pm, ESPNU		at No. 24 Texas	L 69-74	18–10 (6–9)	Frank Erwin Center (12,471); Austin, TX
03/01/2014; 12:30 pm, B12N		Texas Tech	W 59-49	19–10 (7–9)	Ferrell Center (8,827); Waco, TX
03/04/2014; 6:00 pm, ESPN2		No. 16 Iowa State	W 74-61	20–10 (8–9)	Ferrell Center (8,502); Waco, TX
03/08/2014; 12:30 pm, B12N		at Kansas State	W 76-74	21–10 (9–9)	Bramlage Coliseum (12,528); Manhattan, KS
Big 12 tournament
03/12/2014; 8:30 pm, B12N		vs. (10) TCU; First round	W 76–68	22–10	Sprint Center (18,972); Kansas City, MO
03/13/2014; 6:00 pm, B12N		vs. No. 17 (2) Oklahoma; Quarterfinals	W 78–73	23–10	Sprint Center (18,972); Kansas City, MO
03/14/2014; 8:30 pm, ESPNU		vs. (3) Texas; Semifinals	W 86–69	24–10	Sprint Center (18,972); Kansas City, MO
03/15/2014; 8:00 pm, ESPN		vs. No. 16 (4) Iowa State; Championship	L 65-74	24–11	Sprint Center (18,972); Kansas City, MO
NCAA tournament
03/21/2014*; 11:40 am, truTV	No. 23 (W 6)	vs. (W 11) Nebraska; Second round	W 74–60	25–11	AT&T Center (12,895); San Antonio, TX
03/23/2014*; 6:45 pm, truTV	No. 23 (W 6)	vs. No. 16 (W 3) Creighton; Third round	W 85–55	26–11	AT&T Center (13,431); San Antonio, TX
03/27/2014*; 6:47 pm, TBS	No. 23 (W 6)	vs. No. 12 (W 2) Wisconsin; Sweet Sixteen	L 52–69	26–12	Honda Center (17,773); Anaheim, CA
*Non-conference game. ^{#}Rankings from AP Poll, (#) is seed within region W=West. (#) Tournament seedings in parentheses. All times are in Central Time.
