= 2013–14 TCU Horned Frogs men's basketball team =

American college basketball season

2013–14 TCU Horned Frogs men's basketball
- Conference: Big 12 Conference
- Record: 9–22 (0–18 Big 12)
- Head coach: Trent Johnson (2nd season)
- Assistant coaches: Donny Guerinoni; Kwanza Johnson; Brent Scott
- Home arena: Daniel–Meyer Coliseum

2013–14 Big 12 men's basketball standings
	Conf.				Overall
Team	W		L	PCT	W		L	PCT
No. 10 Kansas	14	–	4	.778	25	–	10	.714
No. 21 Oklahoma	12	–	6	.667	23	–	10	.697
Texas	11	–	7	.611	24	–	11	.686
No. 9 Iowa State †	11	–	7	.611	28	–	8	.778
Kansas State	10	–	8	.556	20	–	13	.606
West Virginia	9	–	9	.500	17	–	16	.515
No. 23 Baylor	9	–	9	.500	26	–	12	.684
Oklahoma State	8	–	10	.444	21	–	13	.618
Texas Tech	6	–	12	.333	14	–	18	.438
TCU	0	–	18	.000	9	–	22	.290
† 2014 Big 12 Tournament winner Rankings from AP poll

The 2013–14 TCU Horned Frogs basketball team represented Texas Christian University in the 2013–14 NCAA Division I men's basketball season. This was head coach Trent Johnson's second season at TCU. They played their home games at Daniel–Meyer Coliseum in Fort Worth, Texas and were members of the Big 12 Conference. They finished the season 9–22, 0–18 in Big 12 play to finish in last place. They lost in the first round of the Big 12 tournament to Baylor.

== Before the season ==
=== Departures ===
Name	Number	Pos.	Height	Weight	Year	Hometown	Notes

=== Recruits ===
College recruiting
Name	Hometown	School	Height	Weight	Commit date
Overall recruit ranking: Scout: Not Ranked Rivals: Not Ranked ESPN: Not Ranked
Note: In many cases, Scout, Rivals, 247Sports, On3, and ESPN may conflict in their listings of height and weight.; In these cases, the average was taken. ESPN grades are on a 100-point scale.; Sources: "TCU 2012 Basketball Commitments". Rivals.; "2013 TCU Basketball Commits". Scout.; "ESPN". ESPN.; "Scout.com Team Recruiting Rankings". Scout.; "2013 Team Ranking". Rivals.

== Roster ==
2013–14 TCU Horned Frogs men's basketball team
Players
Coaches

Pos.	#	Name	Height	Weight	Year	Previous school	Hometown
G	0	Charles Hill Jr.	6 ft 2 in (1.88 m)	180 lb (82 kg)	So	Trimble Tech	Ft. Worth, TX
C	1	Karviar Shephard	6 ft 10 in (2.08 m)	225 lb (102 kg)	Fr	Prime Prep Academy	Dallas, TX
G	2	Michael Williams	6 ft 2 in (1.88 m)	185 lb (84 kg)	Fr	Reagan	San Antonio, TX
G	3	Clyde Smith III	6 ft 2 in (1.88 m)	185 lb (84 kg)	Fr	Hotchkiss School	Houston, TX
F	4	Amric Fields	6 ft 9 in (2.06 m)	210 lb (95 kg)	Jr	Putnam West	Oklahoma City, OK
G	5	Kyan Anderson	5 ft 11 in (1.8 m)	175 lb (79 kg)	Jr	North Crowley	Ft. Worth, TX
G	10	Kemal Dincer	6 ft 3 in (1.91 m)	187 lb (85 kg)	So	Robert College	Istanbul, Turkey
F	11	Brandon Parrish	6 ft 6 in (1.98 m)	185 lb (84 kg)	Fr	Seguin	Arlington, TX
G	13	Christian Gore	6 ft 2 in (1.88 m)	175 lb (79 kg)	So	Franklin; Brown	El Paso, TX
G	20	Thomas Montigel	6 ft 2 in (1.88 m)	195 lb (88 kg)	Sr	Paschal	Ft. Worth, TX
G	21	Hudson Price	6 ft 6 in (1.98 m)	200 lb (91 kg)	Fr	The First Academy	Orlando, FL
F	22	Jarvis Ray	6 ft 6 in (1.98 m)	195 lb (88 kg)	Sr	O. Perry Walker	New Orleans, LA
F	23	Devonta Abrom	6 ft 8 in (2.03 m)	255 lb (116 kg)	Jr	Seagoville; Arkansas	Dallas, TX
G	32	Trey Zeigler (redshirt)	6 ft 5 in (1.96 m)	203 lb (92 kg)	Sr	Mount Pleasant; Pittsburgh	Detroit, MI
C	44	Aaron Durley	6 ft 10 in (2.08 m)	270 lb (122 kg)	RS Fr	Fort Bend Bush	Houston, TX

Head coach

- Trent Johnson (Boise State)

Assistant coach(es)

- Donny Guerinoni (Nevada)
- Kwanza Johnson (Tulsa)
- Pooh Williamson (Tulsa)

Legend

- (C) Team captain
- (S) Suspended
- (I) Ineligible
- (W) Walk-on
- Injured
- Current redshirt

== Schedule and results ==
Date time, TV	Opponent	Result	Record	Site (attendance) city, state
Exhibition
11/01/2013*; 7:00 pm	Arkansas–Fort Smith	W 81–74	–	Daniel-Meyer Coliseum (785); Fort Worth, TX
Non-conference games
11/08/2013*; 6:30 pm, FSSW+	vs. SMU	L 61–69	0–1	American Airlines Center (5,207); Dallas, TX
11/12/2013*; 7:00 pm, FSSW+	Longwood	L 79–82	0–2	Daniel-Meyer Coliseum (4,067); Fort Worth, TX
11/19/2013*; 7:00 pm, FSSW+	Abilene Christian	W 71–64	1–2	Daniel-Meyer Coliseum (4,619); Fort Worth, TX
11/24/2013*; 5:00 pm, P12N	at Washington State	W 64–62	2–2	Beasley Coliseum (2,237); Pullman, WA
11/27/2013*; 1:00 am, CBSSN	at Alaska-Anchorage; Great Alaska Shootout – first round	W 73–70	3–2	Sullivan Arena (3,922); Anchorage, AK
11/29/2013*; 8:30 pm, CBSSN	vs. Tulsa; Great Alaska Shootout – semifinals	W 72–65	4–2	Sullivan Arena (3,940); Anchorage, AK
11/30/2013*; 11:30 pm, CBSSN	vs. Harvard; Great Alaska Shootout – championship	L 50–71	4–3	Sullivan Arena (4,253); Anchorage, AK
12/05/2013*; 6:00 pm, ESPNU	at Mississippi State; Big 12/SEC Challenge	W 71–61	5–3	The Hump (6,795); Starkville, MS
12/15/2013*; 1:00 pm, FSSW	Texas–Pan American	W 57–48	6–3	Daniel-Meyer Coliseum (3,958); Fort Worth, TX
12/19/2013*; 7:00 pm, FCS	Grambling State	W 98–75	7–3	Daniel-Meyer Coliseum (4,288); Fort Worth, TX
12/21/2013*; 11:00 am, FSSW+	Tulsa	W 70–58	8–3	Daniel-Meyer Coliseum (4,066); Fort Worth, TX
12/29/2013*; 1:00 pm, FSSW	Texas Southern	W 77–64	9–3	Daniel-Meyer Coliseum (4,146); Fort Worth, TX
Conference games
01/04/2014; 3:00 pm, B12N	West Virginia	L 69–74	9–4 (0–1)	Daniel-Meyer Coliseum (5,038); Fort Worth, TX
01/07/2014; 7:00 pm, B12N	No. 25 Kansas State	L 47–65	9–5 (0–2)	Daniel-Meyer Coliseum (4,280); Fort Worth, TX
01/11/2014; 12:30 pm, B12N	at No. 7 Baylor	L 62–88	9–6 (0–3)	Ferrell Center (7,573); Waco, TX
01/15/2014; 7:00 pm, B12N	at No. 9 Oklahoma State	L 50–82	9–7 (0–4)	Gallagher-Iba Arena (8,890); Stillwater, OK
01/18/2014; 5:00 pm, FSSW	Texas Tech	L 49–60	9–8 (0–5)	Daniel-Meyer Coliseum (6,055); Fort Worth, TX
01/22/2014; 8:00 pm, ESPNU	at No. 25 Oklahoma	L 69–77	9–9 (0–6)	Lloyd Noble Center (9,854); Norman, OK
01/25/2014; 8:00 pm, ESPNU	No. 8 Kansas	L 69–91	9–10 (0–7)	Daniel-Meyer Coliseum (7,494); Fort Worth, TX
02/01/2014; 12:30 pm, B12N	at Texas Tech	L 54–60	9–11 (0–8)	United Spirit Arena (7,365); Lubbock, TX
02/04/2014; 7:00 pm, B12N	No. 15 Texas	L 54–59	9–12 (0–9)	Daniel-Meyer Coliseum (5,233); Fort Worth, TX
02/08/2014; 3:00 pm, B12N	at No. 16 Iowa State	L 69–84	9–13 (0–10)	Hilton Coliseum (14,384); Ames, IA
02/12/2014; 6:00 pm, B12N	Baylor	L 58–91	9–14 (0–11)	Daniel-Meyer Coliseum (4,705); Fort Worth, TX
02/15/2014; 3:00 pm, B12N	at No. 7 Kansas	L 65–95	9–15 (0–12)	Allen Fieldhouse (16,300); Lawrence, KS
02/19/2014; 8:00 pm, ESPNU	at Kansas State	L 53–65	9–16 (0–13)	Bramlage Coliseum (11,969); Manhattan, KS
02/22/2014; 3:00 pm, ESPN2	No. 17 Iowa State	L 60–71	9–17 (0–14)	Daniel-Meyer Coliseum (5,778); Fort Worth, TX
02/24/2014; 6:00 pm, ESPNU	Oklahoma State	L 54–76	9–18 (0–15)	Daniel-Meyer Coliseum (5,723); Fort Worth, TX
03/01/2014; 12:30 pm, RTPT	at West Virginia	L 59–81	9–19 (0–16)	WVU Coliseum (11,358); Morgantown, WV
03/05/2014; 7:00 pm, LHN	at Texas	L 54–66	9–20 (0–17)	Frank Erwin Center (9,450); Austin, TX
03/08/2014; 3:00 pm, B12N	No. 23 Oklahoma	L 67–97	9–21 (0–18)	Daniel-Meyer Coliseum (4,878); Fort Worth, TX
Big 12 tournament
03/12/2014; 8:30 pm, B12N	vs. Baylor; First round	L 68–76	9–22	Sprint Center (18,972); Kansas City, MO
*Non-conference game. ^{#}Rankings from AP Poll / Coaches' Poll. (#) Tournament seedings in parentheses. All times are in Central Time.
