= Gore High School (Oklahoma) =

Coordinates: 35.541684°N 95.123493°W

Location
- 1200 North Highway 10; Gore, Oklahoma 74435

Information
- Type: Public high school
- Principal: James Bliss
- Teaching staff: 12.01 (FTE)
- Grades: 9 - 12
- Enrollment: 139 (2023-2024)
- Student to teacher ratio: 11.57
- Colors: Green and white
- Team name: Pirates

Gore High School is a high school in Gore, Oklahoma.

== Notable people ==
- Professional basketball coach John Whisenant attended Gore High School, where his father and grandfather were both basketball coaches.
