= Fox 4 =

Fox 4 may refer to:

== Television stations in the United States ==
=== Current ===
- KDFW in Dallas–Fort Worth, Texas (owned and operated directly by Fox)
- KFDM-DT3, a digital channel of KFDM in Beaumont, Texas (branded as Fox 4 Beaumont)
- KFQX in Grand Junction, Colorado
- KHMT in Hardin–Billings, Montana
- KTBY in Anchorage, Alaska
- WCBI-TV in Columbus, Mississippi
- WDAF-TV in Kansas City, Missouri

=== Former ===
- KBTV-TV in Port Arthur, Texas (2009–2021)
- KSNB-TV in Superior, Nebraska (1994–2009)
- WFTX-TV in Fort Myers, Florida (broadcasts on channel 26; was branded as Fox 4 from 2000–2026)

== Other uses ==
- Fox four, a brevity code used by NATO pilots; see Fox (code word)
