= KUIL =

KUIL may refer to:

- KUIL-LD, a low-power television station (channel 36, virtual 12) licensed to serve Beaumont, Texas, United States
- KBMT-LD, a low-power television station (channel 43, virtual 12) licensed to serve Beaumont, Texas, which held the call sign KUIL-LD from 2009 to 2018
- Quillayute Airport (ICAO code KUIL)
