= 2013–14 Kansas Jayhawks men's basketball team =

American college basketball season

2013–14 Kansas Jayhawks men's basketball

Big 12 regular season champions

NCAA tournament, round of 32
- Conference: Big 12

Ranking
- Coaches: No. 14
- AP: No. 10
- Record: 25–10 (14–4 Big 12)
- Head coach: Bill Self (11th season)
- Assistant coaches: Jerrance Howard (1st season); Norm Roberts (3rd season); Kurtis Townsend (10th season)
- Home arena: Allen Fieldhouse

2013–14 Big 12 men's basketball standings
	Conf.				Overall
Team	W		L	PCT	W		L	PCT
No. 10 Kansas	14	–	4	.778	25	–	10	.714
No. 21 Oklahoma	12	–	6	.667	23	–	10	.697
Texas	11	–	7	.611	24	–	11	.686
No. 9 Iowa State †	11	–	7	.611	28	–	8	.778
Kansas State	10	–	8	.556	20	–	13	.606
West Virginia	9	–	9	.500	17	–	16	.515
No. 23 Baylor	9	–	9	.500	26	–	12	.684
Oklahoma State	8	–	10	.444	21	–	13	.618
Texas Tech	6	–	12	.333	14	–	18	.438
TCU	0	–	18	.000	9	–	22	.290
† 2014 Big 12 Tournament winner Rankings from AP poll

The 2013–14 Kansas Jayhawks men's basketball team represented the University of Kansas in the 2013–14 NCAA Division I men's basketball season, which was the Jayhawks' 116th basketball season. The Jayhawks played their home games at Allen Fieldhouse as a member of the Big 12 Conference. They finished the season 25–10, 14–4 in Big 12 play to win the Big 12 regular season championship. They advanced to the semifinals of the Big 12 tournament where they lost to Iowa State. They received an at-large bid to the NCAA tournament where they defeated Eastern Kentucky in the round of 64 before losing in the round of 32 to Stanford.

On February 24, 2014, the Jayhawks made history in the "modern era of basketball" by clinching their 10th consecutive Big 12 regular season championship. Only UCLA had won more consecutive "power conference" championships with 13 (1967–1979). Head Coach Bill Self also made history by passing John Wooden and Adolph Rupp (nine consecutive regular season conference championships) for the most consecutive conference championships all-time.

== Pre-season ==
=== Departures ===
Name	Position	Reason
Kevin Young	Forward	Graduation
Jeff Withey	Center	Graduation
Travis Releford	Guard	Graduation
Elijah Johnson	Guard	Graduation
Ben McLemore	Guard	Entered NBA draft

=== Transfers ===
Name	Position	Old school	New school
Hunter Mickelson	PF	Arkansas	Kansas
Rio Adams	G	Kansas	Odessa College
Tarik Black	F	Memphis	Kansas

=== Coaching changes ===
Coach	Old Position	New Position
Joe Dooley	Kansas Assistant	Florida Gulf Coast Head Coach
Jerrance Howard	SMU Assistant	Kansas Assistant
Doc Sadler	Kansas Director of Basketball Operations	Iowa State Assistant
Brennan Bechard	Kansas Assistant Director of Basketball Operations	Kansas Director of Basketball Operations

=== Recruiting ===
==== Class of 2013 ====
Kansas recruits at the 2013 McDonald's All-American Boys Game

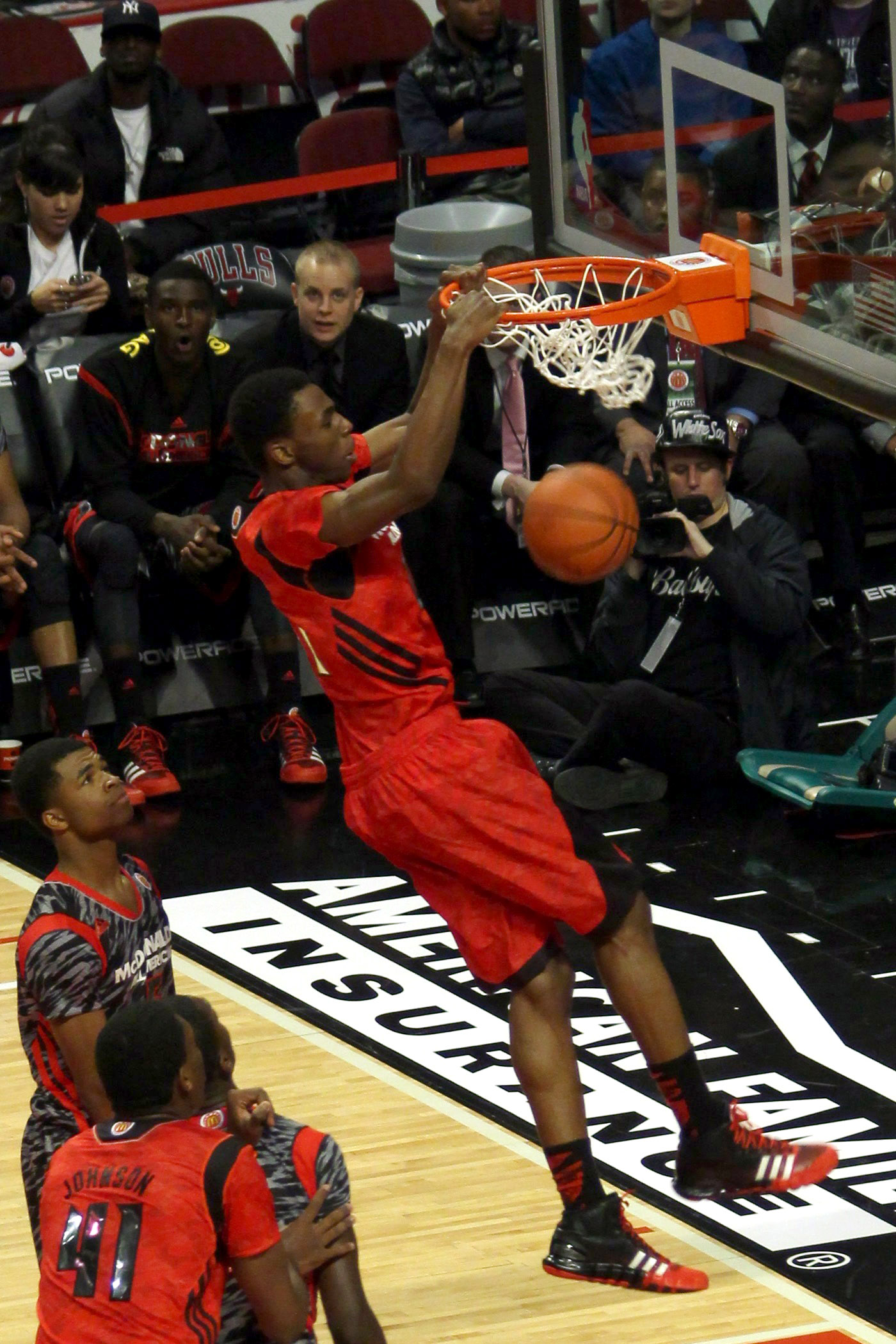
Andrew Wiggins

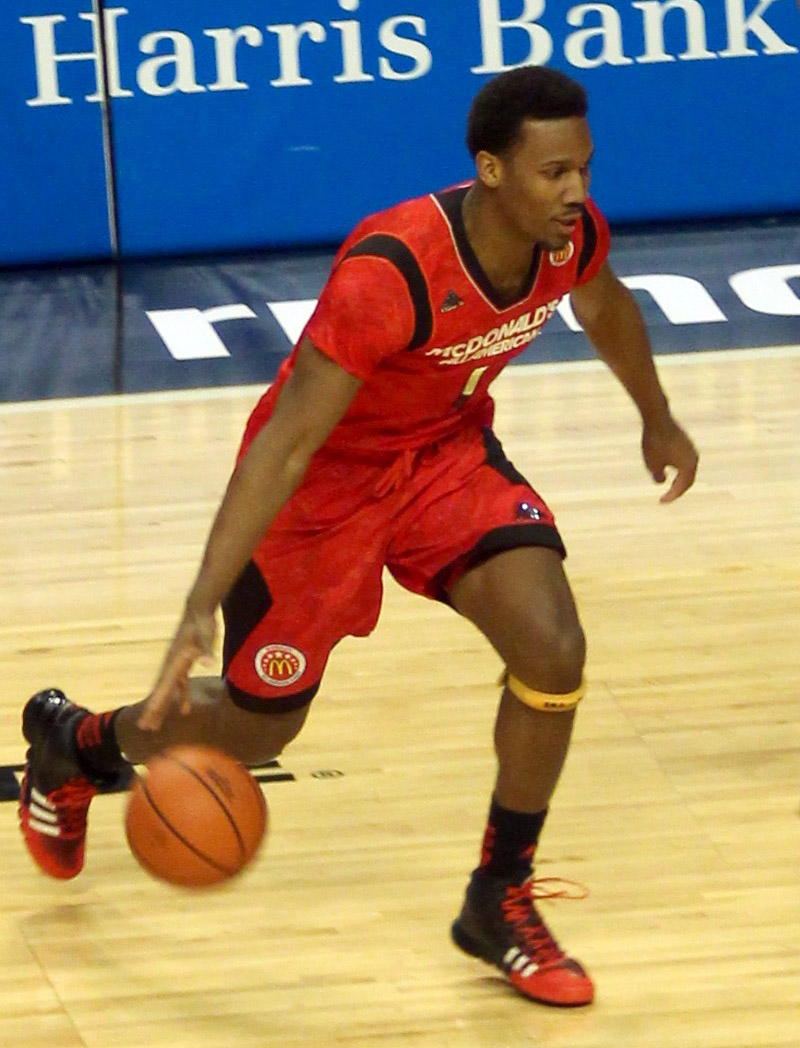
Wayne Selden, Jr.

College recruiting information
Name	Hometown	School	Height	Weight	Commit date
Andrew Wiggins; SF	Thornhill, Ontario	Huntington Prep	6 ft 7 in (2.01 m)	205 lb (93 kg)	May 14, 2013
Andrew Wiggins; SF	Recruit ratings: Scout: Rivals: 247Sports: ESPN: (97)				
Wayne Selden Jr. SF	Boston, Massachusetts	The Tilton School	6 ft 5 in (1.96 m)	220 lb (100 kg)	Oct 15, 2012
Wayne Selden Jr. SF	Recruit ratings: Scout: Rivals: 247Sports: ESPN: (93)				
Joel Embiid; C	Yaoundé, Cameroon	The Rock School (Gainesville, FL)	6 ft 11 in (2.11 m)	230 lb (100 kg)	Nov 13, 2012
Joel Embiid; C	Recruit ratings: Scout: Rivals: 247Sports: ESPN: (95)				
Brannen Greene; SG	Monroe, Georgia	Tift County High School	6 ft 6 in (1.98 m)	215 lb (98 kg)	Dec 20, 2011
Brannen Greene; SG	Recruit ratings: Scout: Rivals: 247Sports: ESPN: (88)				
Conner Frankamp; PG	Wichita, Kansas	Wichita North High School	6 ft 0 in (1.83 m)	155 lb (70 kg)	Jul 17, 2011
Conner Frankamp; PG	Recruit ratings: Scout: Rivals: 247Sports: ESPN: (88)				
Frank Mason III; PG	Petersburg, Virginia	Massanutten Military Academy	5 ft 10 in (1.78 m)	170 lb (77 kg)	Oct 9, 2012
Frank Mason III; PG	Recruit ratings: Scout: Rivals: 247Sports: ESPN: (79)				
Overall recruiting rankings: Scout: 2 Rivals: 2 247 Sports: 2 ESPN: 2

== Roster ==
2013–14 Kansas Jayhawks men's basketball team
Players
Coaches

Pos.	#	Name	Height	Weight	Year	Hometown
G	0	Frank Mason	5 ft 11 in (1.8 m)	185 lb (84 kg)	Fr	Petersburg, VA
G	1	Wayne Selden, Jr.	6 ft 5 in (1.96 m)	230 lb (104 kg)	Fr	Boston, MA
G	3	Andrew White	6 ft 6 in (1.98 m)	210 lb (95 kg)	So	Chester, VA
F	4	Justin Wesley	6 ft 9 in (2.06 m)	220 lb (100 kg)	RS Sr	Fort Worth, TX
G	5	Evan Manning	6 ft 3 in (1.91 m)	170 lb (77 kg)	So	Lawrence, KS
G	10	Naadir Tharpe	5 ft 11 in (1.8 m)	170 lb (77 kg)	Jr	Worcester, MA
G	11	Tyler Self (redshirt)	6 ft 2 in (1.88 m)	165 lb (75 kg)	So	Lawrence, KS
G	14	Brannen Greene	6 ft 7 in (2.01 m)	215 lb (98 kg)	Fr	Monroe, GA
G	15	Christian Garrett	6 ft 3 in (1.91 m)	185 lb (84 kg)	RS Jr	Los Angeles, CA
G	20	Niko Roberts	5 ft 11 in (1.8 m)	175 lb (79 kg)	Sr	Huntington, NY
C	21	Joel Embiid	7 ft 0 in (2.13 m)	250 lb (113 kg)	Fr	Yaoundé, Cameroon
F	22	Andrew Wiggins	6 ft 8 in (2.03 m)	200 lb (91 kg)	Fr	Thornhill, ON
G	23	Conner Frankamp	6 ft 0 in (1.83 m)	165 lb (75 kg)	Fr	Wichita, KS
F	25	Tarik Black	6 ft 9 in (2.06 m)	260 lb (118 kg)	Sr	Memphis, TN
F	31	Jamari Traylor	6 ft 8 in (2.03 m)	220 lb (100 kg)	RS So	Chicago, IL
C	33	Landen Lucas	6 ft 10 in (2.08 m)	240 lb (109 kg)	RS Fr	Portland, OR
F	34	Perry Ellis	6 ft 8 in (2.03 m)	225 lb (102 kg)	So	Wichita, KS
C	42	Hunter Mickelson (redshirt)	6 ft 10 in (2.08 m)	245 lb (111 kg)	Jr	Jonesboro, AR

Head coach

- Bill Self (Oklahoma State)

Assistant coach(es)

- Norm Roberts (Queens)
- Kurtis Townsend (Western Kentucky)
- Jerrance Howard (Illinois)

Legend

- (C) Team captain
- (S) Suspended
- (I) Ineligible
- (W) Walk-on
- Injured
- Current redshirt

Roster
Last update: March 12, 2014

== Schedule ==
Date time, TV	Rank^{#}	Opponent^{#}	Result	Record	High points	High rebounds	High assists	Site (attendance) city, state
Exhibition
10/29/2013*; 7:00 pm, Jayhawk TV	No. 5	Pittsburg State	W 97–57	–	16 – Wiggins, Ellis	11 – Black	9 – Tharpe	Allen Fieldhouse (16,300); Lawrence, Kansas
11/05/2013*; 7:00 pm, Jayhawk TV	No. 5	Fort Hays State	W 92–75	–	13 – Selden Jr., Ellis	7 – Traylor, Embiid	6 – Mason, Tharpe	Allen Fieldhouse (16,300); Lawrence, Kansas
Non-conference regular season
11/08/2013*; 7:00 pm, Jayhawk TV	No. 5	Louisiana Monroe	W 80–63	1–0	16 – Wiggins	8 – Ellis	5 – Mason	Allen Fieldhouse (16,300); Lawrence, Kansas
11/12/2013*; 8:30 pm, ESPN	No. 5	vs. No. 4 Duke; Champions Classic	W 94–83	2–0	24 – Ellis	10 – Wiggins	4 – Selden Jr.	United Center (22,711); Chicago, Illinois
11/19/2013*; 7:00 pm, Jayhawk TV	No. 2	Iona	W 86–66	3–0	21 – Ellis	13 – Embiid	10 – Tharpe	Allen Fieldhouse (16,300); Lawrence, Kansas
11/22/2013*; 7:00 pm, Jayhawk TV	No. 2	Towson; Battle 4 Atlantis	W 88–58	4–0	16 – Wiggins	8 – Embiid	6 – Mason	Allen Fieldhouse (16,300); Lawrence, Kansas
11/28/2013*; 2:30 pm, AXS TV	No. 2	vs. Wake Forest; Battle 4 Atlantis	W 87–78	5–0	17 – Wiggins	7 – Ellis	4 – Wiggins	Imperial Arena (3,380); Paradise Island, Bahamas
11/29/2013*; 8:30 pm, NBCSN	No. 2	vs. Villanova; Battle 4 Atlantis	L 59–63	5–1	12 – Mason	5 – Embiid	4 – Tharpe	Imperial Arena (3,393); Paradise Island, Bahamas
11/30/2013*; 6:00 pm, NBCSN	No. 2	vs. UTEP; Battle 4 Atlantis	W 67–63	6–1	19 – Ellis	7 – Ellis, Wiggins	4 – Tharpe	Imperial Arena (3,350); Paradise Island, Bahamas
12/07/2013*; 2:15 pm, ESPN2	No. 6	at Colorado	L 72–75	6–2	22 – Wiggins	8 – Ellis	4 – Mason	Coors Events Center (11,113); Boulder, Colorado
12/10/2013*; 6:00 pm, ESPN	No. 13	at No. 19 Florida; Big 12/SEC Challenge	L 61–67	6–3	26 – Wiggins	11 – Wiggins	5 – Tharpe	O'Connell Center (12,423); Gainesville, Florida
12/14/2013*; 6:00 pm, ESPN2	No. 13	vs. New Mexico; Kansas City Shootout	W 80–63	7–3	21 – Ellis	9 – Ellis	9 – Tharpe	Sprint Center (18,493); Kansas City, Missouri
12/21/2013*; 11:00 am, ESPN	No. 18	Georgetown	W 86–64	8–3	17 – Black, Embiid	8 – Embiid	4 – 4 Tied	Allen Fieldhouse (16,300); Lawrence, Kansas
12/30/2013*; 7:00 pm, Jayhawk TV	No. 16	Toledo	W 93–83	9–3	21 – Ellis	11 – Ellis	8 – Tharpe	Allen Fieldhouse (16,300); Lawrence, Kansas
01/05/2014*; 4:30 pm, CBS	No. 16	No. 21 San Diego State	L 57–61	9–4	14 – Wiggins, Mason	12 – Embiid	5 – Tharpe	Allen Fieldhouse (16,300); Lawrence, Kansas
Big 12 regular season
01/08/2014; 6:00 pm, ESPN2	No. 18	at Oklahoma	W 90–83	10–4 (1–0)	24 – Selden Jr.	11 – Ellis	3 – Tharpe	Lloyd Noble Center (13,127); Norman, Oklahoma
01/11/2014; 1:00 pm, ESPN	No. 18	No. 25 Kansas State; Sunflower Showdown	W 86–60	11–4 (2–0)	22 – Wiggins	9 – Embiid	9 – Tharpe	Allen Fieldhouse (16,300); Lawrence, Kansas
01/13/2014; 8:00 pm, ESPN	No. 15	at No. 8 Iowa State	W 77–70	12–4 (3–0)	23 – Tharpe	19 – Wiggins	6 – Selden Jr.	Hilton Coliseum (14,384); Ames, Iowa
01/18/2014; 3:00 pm, CBS	No. 15	No. 9 Oklahoma State	W 80–78	13–4 (4–0)	21 – Tharpe	11 – Embiid	6 – Tharpe	Allen Fieldhouse (16,300); Lawrence, Kansas
01/20/2014; 8:00 pm, ESPN	No. 8	No. 24 Baylor	W 78–68	14–4 (5–0)	18 – Ellis	7 – Wiggins	6 – Mason	Allen Fieldhouse (16,300); Lawrence, Kansas
01/25/2014; 8:00 pm, ESPNU	No. 8	at TCU	W 91–69	15–4 (6–0)	27 – Wiggins	14 – Ellis	5 – Wiggins	Daniel–Meyer Coliseum (7,494); Fort Worth, Texas
01/29/14; 8:00 pm, ESPNU	No. 6	No. 16 Iowa State	W 92–81	16–4 (7–0)	29 – Wiggins	11 – Embiid	12 – Tharpe	Allen Fieldhouse (16,300); Lawrence, Kansas
02/01/2014; 3:00 pm, ESPN	No. 6	at No. 25 Texas	L 69–81	16–5 (7–1)	21 – Selden Jr.	10 – Embiid	3 – Tharpe	Frank Erwin Center (16,540); Austin, Texas
02/04/2014; 6:00 pm, ESPN2	No. 8	at Baylor	W 69–52	17–5 (8–1)	22 – Tharpe	10 – Ellis	5 – Wiggins, Selden Jr.	Ferrell Center (8,305); Waco, Texas
02/08/2014; 3:00 pm, ESPN	No. 8	West Virginia	W 83–69	18–5 (9–1)	19 – Wiggins	12 – Embiid	5 – Mason	Allen Fieldhouse (16,300); Lawrence, Kansas
02/10/2014; 8:00 pm, ESPN	No. 7	at Kansas State; Sunflower Showdown	L 82–85 ^{OT}	18–6 (9–2)	19 – Ellis	11 – Ellis	10 – Tharpe	Bramlage Coliseum (12,528); Manhattan, Kansas
02/15/2014; 3:00 pm, B12N	No. 7	TCU	W 95–65	19–6 (10–2)	32 – Ellis	8 – Ellis, Traylor	5 – Ellis	Allen Fieldhouse (16,300); Lawrence, Kansas
02/18/2014; 7:00 pm, B12N	No. 8	at Texas Tech	W 64–63	20–6 (11–2)	19 – Wiggins	8 – Embiid	2 – Wiggins, Tharpe	United Spirit Arena (12,667); Lubbock, Texas
02/22/2014; 6:30 pm, ESPNU	No. 8	No. 19 Texas	W 85–54	21–6 (12–2)	21 – Wiggins	7 – Embiid	7 – Selden Jr.	Allen Fieldhouse (16,300); Lawrence, Kansas
02/24/2014; 8:00 pm, ESPN	No. 5	Oklahoma	W 83–75	22–6 (13–2)	19 – Tharpe	13 – Embiid	5 – Tharpe	Allen Fieldhouse (16,300); Lawrence, Kansas
03/01/2014; 8:00 pm, ESPN	No. 5	at Oklahoma State; ESPN College Gameday	L 65–72	22–7 (13–3)	15 – Wiggins	13 – Embiid	5 – Tharpe	Gallagher-Iba Arena (13,611); Stillwater, Oklahoma
03/05/2014; 7:00 pm, B12N	No. 8	Texas Tech	W 82–57	23–7 (14–3)	19 – Black	6 – Black	5 – Tharpe	Allen Fieldhouse (16,300); Lawrence, Kansas
03/08/2014; 11:00 am, ESPN	No. 8	at West Virginia	L 86–92	23–8 (14–4)	41 – Wiggins	8 – Wiggins	2 – Wiggins, Mason, Selden Jr.	WVU Coliseum (14,038); Morgantown, West Virginia
Big 12 Tournament
03/13/2014; 2:00 pm, ESPN2	No. 10	vs. Oklahoma State; Quarterfinals	W 77–70 ^{OT}	24–8	30 – Wiggins	12 – Black	7 – Tharpe	Sprint Center (18,972); Kansas City, Missouri
03/14/2014; 6:00 pm, ESPNU	No. 10	vs. No. 16 Iowa State; Semifinals	L 83–94	24–9	30 – Ellis	10 – Black	9 – Tharpe	Sprint Center (18,972); Kansas City, Missouri
NCAA Tournament
03/21/2014*; 3:10 pm, TBS	No. 10 (2 S)	vs. (15 S) Eastern Kentucky; First Round	W 80–69	25–9	19 – Wiggins	14 – Traylor	4 – Frankamp, Mason, Selden Jr.	Scottrade Center (17,955); St. Louis, MO
03/23/2014*; 11:15 am, CBS	No. 10 (2 S)	vs. (10 S) Stanford; Second Round	L 57–60	25–10	18 – Black	8 – Ellis	2 – Mason, Tharpe, Selden Jr.	Scottrade Center (19,676); St. Louis, MO
*Non-conference game. ^{#}Rankings from AP Poll, for NCAA tournament (#) is seed within region S=South. (#) Tournament seedings in parentheses. All times are in Central Time.

== Rankings ==
Ranking movements Legend: ██ Increase in ranking ██ Decrease in ranking
	Week																					
Poll	Pre	1	2	3	4	5	6	7	8	9	10	11	12	13	14	15	16	17	18	19	20	Final
AP	5	5	2	2	2	6	13	18	16	16	18	15	8	6	8	7	8	5	8	10	10	N/A*
Coaches	6	6	3	3	2	7	13	19	16	17	20	18	11	7	9	7	8	6	8	10	10	14

*AP does not release post-tournament rankings
