= 2013–14 Iowa State Cyclones men's basketball team =

American college basketball season

2013–14 Iowa State Cyclones men's basketball

Big 12 Conference tournament champions Diamond Head Classic champions

NCAA tournament, Sweet Sixteen
- Conference: Big 12 Conference

Ranking
- Coaches: No. 11
- AP: No. 9
- Record: 28–8 (11–7 Big 12)
- Head coach: Fred Hoiberg (4th season)
- Assistant coaches: Doc Sadler (1st season); Matt Abdelmassih; Cornell Mann
- Home arena: Hilton Coliseum

2013–14 Big 12 men's basketball standings
	Conf.				Overall
Team	W		L	PCT	W		L	PCT
No. 10 Kansas	14	–	4	.778	25	–	10	.714
No. 21 Oklahoma	12	–	6	.667	23	–	10	.697
Texas	11	–	7	.611	24	–	11	.686
No. 9 Iowa State †	11	–	7	.611	28	–	8	.778
Kansas State	10	–	8	.556	20	–	13	.606
West Virginia	9	–	9	.500	17	–	16	.515
No. 23 Baylor	9	–	9	.500	26	–	12	.684
Oklahoma State	8	–	10	.444	21	–	13	.618
Texas Tech	6	–	12	.333	14	–	18	.438
TCU	0	–	18	.000	9	–	22	.290
† 2014 Big 12 Tournament winner Rankings from AP poll

The 2013–14 Iowa State Cyclones men's basketball team represented Iowa State University during the 2013–14 NCAA Division I men's basketball season. The Cyclones were coached by Fred Hoiberg, who was in his 4th season. They played their home games at Hilton Coliseum in Ames, Iowa, and competed in the Big 12 Conference.

They finished the season 28–8, 11–7 in Big 12 play to finish in a tie for third place. They defeated Kansas State, Kansas, and Baylor to become champions of the Big 12 Conference tournament to earn an automatic bid to the NCAA tournament. In the NCAA Tournament, they defeated North Carolina Central and North Carolina to advance to the Sweet Sixteen, where they lost to eventual national champion UConn, without the Cyclones' third-leading scorer Georges Niang, who suffered a season-ending injury in the opening round game.

== Previous season ==
The Cyclones finished 23–12, and 11–7 in Big 12 play to finish 4th in the regular season conference standings. They defeated Oklahoma, then lost to Kansas in the semifinals of the Big 12 tournament. They received an at-large bid to the NCAA tournament, where they defeated Notre Dame and lost to Ohio State.

=== Offseason departures ===
Offseason departures
Name	Position	Reason for departure
Cameron Fowler	Guard	Transferred to Niagara
Nkereuwem Okoro	Guard	Transferred to Rutgers
Chris Babb	Guard	Graduated
Korie Lucious	Guard	Graduated
Will Clyburn	Guard	Graduated
Tyrus McGee	Guard	Graduated
Austin McBeth	Guard	Graduated
Anthony Booker	Forward	Graduated

== Recruiting ==
=== Prep recruits ===
College recruiting
Name	Hometown	School	Height	Weight	Commit date
Monté Morris; PG #12	Flint, Michigan	Beecher	6 ft 3 in (1.91 m)	175 lb (79 kg)	Jun 27, 2012
Monté Morris; PG #12	Recruit ratings: Scout: Rivals: 247Sports: ESPN: (84)				
Matt Thomas; SG #17	Onalaska, Wisconsin	Onalaska	6 ft 4 in (1.93 m)	170 lb (77 kg)	Jun 15, 2012
Matt Thomas; SG #17	Recruit ratings: Scout: Rivals: 247Sports: ESPN: (87)				
Overall recruit ranking: 247Sports: 37 ESPN: 30
Note: In many cases, Scout, Rivals, 247Sports, On3, and ESPN may conflict in their listings of height and weight.; In these cases, the average was taken. ESPN grades are on a 100-point scale.; Sources: "Iowa State 2013 Basketball Commitments". Rivals.; "2013 Iowa State Basketball Commits". Scout.; "ESPN". ESPN.; "Scout.com Team Recruiting Rankings". Scout.; "2013 Team Ranking". Rivals.

=== Incoming transfers ===
Incoming transfers
Name	Position	Hometown	Previous school	Remaining eligibility	Notes
DeAndre Kane	Guard	Pittsburgh	Marshall	1	Kane was eligible to play immediately.
Abdel Nader	Forward	Skokie, Illinois	Northern Illinois	2	Nader sat out the 2012–13 season due to NCAA eligibility rules.
Jameel McKay	Center	Milwaukee	Marquette	1.5	McKay transferred after the fall semester of the 2011–12 season. He was eligible to play the spring semester of the 2013–14 season.

== Roster ==
2013–14 Iowa State Cyclones men's basketball team
Players
Coaches

Pos.	#	Name	Height	Weight	Year	Previous school	Hometown
G	1	Bubu Palo (S)	6 ft 1 in (1.85 m)	175 lb (79 kg)	RS Sr	Ames	Ames, Iowa
F/C	1	Jameel McKay (redshirt)	6 ft 9 in (2.06 m)	225 lb (102 kg)	RS Jr	Marquette	Milwaukee
F	2	Abdel Nader (redshirt)	6 ft 6 in (1.98 m)	225 lb (102 kg)	RS Jr	Northern Illinois	Skokie, Illinois
F	3	Melvin Ejim (C)	6 ft 6 in (1.98 m)	230 lb (104 kg)	Sr	Brewster Academy	Toronto
G	11	Monté Morris	6 ft 2 in (1.88 m)	195 lb (88 kg)	Fr	Beecher	Flint, Michigan
G	15	Naz Long	6 ft 4 in (1.93 m)	210 lb (95 kg)	So	Findlay Prep	Mississauga, Ontario
G	21	Matt Thomas	6 ft 3 in (1.91 m)	190 lb (86 kg)	Fr	Onalaska	Onalaska, Wisconsin
F	22	Dustin Hogue	6 ft 6 in (1.98 m)	205 lb (93 kg)	Jr	Indian Hills CC	Yonkers, New York
F	31	Georges Niang (C)	6 ft 7 in (2.01 m)	245 lb (111 kg)	So	Tilton School	Methuen, Massachusetts
			—	—
F	42	Daniel Edozie	6 ft 8 in (2.03 m)	235 lb (107 kg)	Jr	Tyler JC	Compton, California
G	50	DeAndre Kane (C)	6 ft 4 in (1.93 m)	195 lb (88 kg)	RS Sr	Marshall	Pittsburgh

Head coach

- Fred Hoiberg (Iowa State)

Assistant coach(es)

- Doc Sadler (Arkansas)
- Matt Abdelmassih (St. John's)
- Cornell Mann (Akron)

Legend

- (C) Team captain
- (S) Suspended
- (I) Ineligible
- (W) Walk-on
- Injured
- Current redshirt

== Schedule and results ==
Date time, TV	Rank^{#}	Opponent^{#}	Result	Record	High points	High rebounds	High assists	Site (attendance) city, state
Exhibition
November 3, 2013; 5:00 pm, Cyclones.tv		Augustana	W 88–70	–	– –	– –	– –	Hilton Coliseum (–); Ames, Iowa
Regular season
November 10, 2013*; 12:00 pm, Cyclones.tv		UNC Wilmington	W 95–62	1–0	26 – Long	11 – Kane	7 – Kane	Hilton Coliseum (14,384); Ames, Iowa
November 12, 2013*; 7:00 pm, Cyclones.tv		Texas A&M–Corpus Christi	W 80–50	2–0	15 – Kane	8 – Hogue	5 – Niang	Hilton Coliseum (13,238); Ames, Iowa
November 17, 2013*; 4:00 pm, ESPN2		No. 7 Michigan	W 77–70	3–0	22 – Ejim	10 – Hogue	6 – Kane	Hilton Coliseum (14,384); Ames, Iowa
November 20, 2013*; 8:30 pm, ESPNU	No. 21	at BYU	W 90–88	4–0	21 – Kane	11 – Kane	8 – Niang	Marriott Center (15,808); Provo, Utah
November 25, 2013*; 7:00 pm, Cyclones.tv	No. 17	UMKC	W 110–51	5–0	20 – Kane	9 – Ejim	7 – Morris	Hilton Coliseum (12,960); Ames, Iowa
December 2, 2013*; 6:00 pm, ESPNU	No. 17	Auburn; Big 12/SEC Challenge	W 99–70	6–0	22 – Hogue	16 – Hogue	9 – Morris	Hilton Coliseum (13,889); Ames, Iowa
December 7, 2013*; 5:00 pm, Mediacom	No. 17	vs. Northern Iowa; Big Four Classic	W 91–82 ^{OT}	7–0	22 – Ejim	10 – Hogue	6 – Kane	Wells Fargo Arena (14,512); Des Moines, Iowa
December 13, 2013*; 8:30 pm, ESPNU	No. 17	No. 23 Iowa; Iowa Corn Cy-Hawk Series	W 85–82	8–0	24 – Niang	16 – Hogue	9 – Kane	Hilton Coliseum (14,384); Ames, Iowa
December 22, 2013*; 4:30 pm, ESPNU	No. 17	vs. George Mason; Diamond Head Classic; First round	W 79–67	9–0	22 – Niang	11 – Ejim	8 – Kane	Stan Sheriff Center (8,694); Honolulu, HI
December 23, 2013*; 3:30 pm, ESPNU	No. 14	vs. Akron; Diamond Head Classic; Semifinals	W 83–60	10–0	22 – Niang	12 – Ejim	5 – Kane	Stan Sheriff Center (7,140); Honolulu
December 25, 2013*; 7:30 pm, ESPN2	No. 14	vs. Boise State; Diamond Head Classic; Championship	W 70–66	11–0	23 – Kane	10 – Ejim	3 – Ejim	Stan Sheriff Center (6,769); Honolulu
December 31, 2013*; 6:00 pm, Cyclones.tv	No. 13	Northern Illinois	W 99–63	12–0	17 – Ejim	8 – Kane	12 – Kane	Hilton Coliseum (14,384); Ames, Iowa
Big 12 regular season
January 4, 2014; 12:30 pm, Big 12 Network	No. 13	at Texas Tech	W 73–62	13–0 (1–0)	17 – Niang	7 – Niang	6 – Kane	United Spirit Arena (5,861); Lubbock, Texas
January 7, 2014; 6:00 pm, ESPN2	No. 9	No. 7 Baylor	W 87–72	14–0 (2–0)	30 – Kane	10 – Hogue	9 – Kane	Hilton Coliseum (14,384); Ames, Iowa
January 11, 2014; 11:00 am, ESPNU	No. 9	at Oklahoma	L 82–87	14–1 (2–1)	23 – Kane	9 – Kane	4 – Kane	Lloyd Noble Center (11,105); Norman, Oklahoma
January 13, 2014; 8:00 pm, ESPN	No. 8	No. 15 Kansas	L 70–77	14–2 (2–2)	21 – Kane	9 – Hogue	4 – Morris	Hilton Coliseum (14,384); Ames, Iowa
January 18, 2014; 3:00 pm, Big 12 Network	No. 8	at Texas	L 76–86	14–3 (2–3)	18 – Niang	10 – Ejim	6 – Niang	Frank Erwin Center (12,709); Austin, Texas
January 25, 2014; 12:30 pm, Big 12 Network	No. 16	No. 22 Kansas State	W 81–75	15–3 (3–3)	20 – Ejim	12 – Hogue	5 – Kane	Hilton Coliseum (14,384); Ames, Iowa
January 29, 2014; 8:00 pm, ESPNU	No. 16	at No. 6 Kansas	L 81–92	15–4 (3–4)	24 – Niang	8 – Ejim	5 – Niang	Allen Fieldhouse (16,300); Lawrence, Kansas
February 1, 2014; 3:00 pm, Big 12 Network	No. 16	No. 23 Oklahoma	W 81–75	16–4 (4–4)	27 – Niang	16 – Ejim	9 – Kane	Hilton Coliseum (14,384); Ames, Iowa
February 3, 2014; 8:00 pm, ESPN	No. 16	at No. 19 Oklahoma State	W 98–97 ^{3OT}	17–4 (5–4)	26 – Kane	13 – Ejim	9 – Kane	Gallagher-Iba Arena (10,132); Stillwater, Oklahoma
February 8, 2014; 3:00 pm, Big 12 Network	No. 16	TCU	W 84–69	18–4 (6–4)	48 – Ejim	18 – Ejim	10 – Kane	Hilton Coliseum (14,384); Ames, Iowa
February 10, 2014; 6:00 pm, ESPNU	No. 11	at West Virginia	L 77–102	18–5 (6–5)	17 – Niang	12 – Ejim	6 – Morris	WVU Coliseum (8,177); Morgantown, West Virginia
February 15, 2014; 12:30 pm, Big 12 Network	No. 11	Texas Tech	W 70–64	19–5 (7–5)	17 – Kane	8 – Kane	9 – Kane	Hilton Coliseum (14,384); Ames, Iowa
February 18, 2014; 6:00 pm, Big 12 Network	No. 17	No. 19 Texas	W 85–76	20–5 (8–5)	25 – Ejim	8 – Ejim	6 – Morris	Hilton Coliseum (14,384); Ames, Iowa
February 22, 2014; 3:00 pm, ESPN2	No. 17	at TCU	W 71–60	21–5 (9–5)	20 – Kane	8 – Niang	5 – Kane	Daniel–Meyer Coliseum (5,778); Fort Worth, Texas
February 26, 2014; 7:00 pm, Big 12 Network	No. 15	West Virginia	W 83–66	22–5 (10–5)	24 – Niang	11 – Kane	12 – Morris	Hilton Coliseum (14,384); Ames, Iowa
March 1, 2014; 6:00 pm, ESPNU	No. 15	at Kansas State	L 73–80	22–6 (10–6)	30 – Ejim	16 – Ejim	6 – Kane	Bramlage Coliseum (12,528); Manhattan, Kansas
March 4, 2014; 6:00 pm, ESPN2	No. 16	at Baylor	L 61–74	22–7 (10–7)	20 – Kane	9 – Ejim	5 – Morris	Ferrell Center; Waco, Texas
March 8, 2014; 1:00 pm, ESPN	No. 16	Oklahoma State	W 85–81 ^{OT}	23–7 (11–7)	27 – Kane	12 – Hogue	8 – Kane	Hilton Coliseum (14,384); Ames, Iowa
Big 12 Tournament
March 13, 2014; 11:30 am, ESPN2	No. 16	vs. Kansas State; Quarterfinals	W 91–85	24–7	24 – Ejim	10 – Ejim	10 – Morris	Sprint Center (18,972); Kansas City, Missouri
March 14, 2014; 6:00 pm, ESPNU	No. 16	vs. No. 10 Kansas; Semifinals	W 94–83	25–7	25 – Niang	9 – Hogue	7 – Niang	Sprint Center (18,972); Kansas City, Missouri
March 15, 2014; 8:00 pm, ESPN	No. 16	vs. Baylor; Championship	W 74–65	26–7	17 – Kane	9 – Niang	7 – Kane	Sprint Center (19,108); Kansas City, Missouri
NCAA Tournament
March 21, 2014; 8:50 pm, TNT	(3) No. 9	vs. (14) North Carolina Central; Second round	W 93–75	27–7	24 – Niang	8 – Ejim	5 – Kane	AT&T Center (11,690); San Antonio, Texas
March 23, 2014; 4:15 pm, CBS	(3) No. 9	vs. (6) No. 19 North Carolina; Third round	W 85–83	28–7	24 – Kane	10 – Kane	7 – Kane	AT&T Center (13,431); San Antonio, Texas
March 28, 2014; 6:25 pm, TBS	(3) No. 9	vs. (7) No. 18 UConn; Sweet Sixteen	L 76–81	28–8	34 – Hogue	8 – Kane	9 – Kane	Madison Square Garden (19,314); New York
*Non-conference game. ^{#}Rankings from AP poll. (#) Tournament seedings in parentheses. All times are in Central Time.

== Rankings ==
Ranking movements Legend: ██ Increase in ranking ██ Decrease in ranking RV = Received votes
	Week																				
Poll	Pre	1	2	3	4	5	6	7	8	9	10	11	12	13	14	15	16	17	18	19	Final
AP poll				21	17	17	17	17	14	14	9	8	16	16	16	11	17	15	16	16	9
Coaches Poll	RV	RV	RV	RV	22	18	16	13	13	12	7	10	17	18	17	14	19	17	17	16	9

== Awards and honors ==
- All-Americans

Melvin Ejim (1st Team)
DeAndre Kane (2nd Team)

- Academic All-American

Melvin Ejim

- All-Conference Selections

Melvin Ejim (1st Team)
DeAndre Kane (1st Team)
Georges Niang (3rd Team)

- Academic All-Big 12 First Team

Melvin Ejim
Percy Gibson
Alex-Javad Assadipour

- Big 12 Newcomer of the Year

DeAndre Kane

- Big 12 All-Newcomer Team

DeAndre Kane
