= 2013 Diamond Head Classic =

College basketball competition

- Season: 2013–14
- Teams: 8
- Finals site: Stan Sheriff Center; Honolulu, Hawaii
- Champions: Iowa State (1st title)
- Runner-up: Boise State (1st title game)
- Semifinalists: Akron (1st semifinal); South Carolina (1st semifinal)
- Winning coach: Fred Hoiberg (1st title)
- MVP: DeAndre Kane (Iowa State)

The 2013 Diamond Head Classic was a mid-season eight-team college basketball tournament played on December 22, 23, and 25 at the Stan Sheriff Center in Honolulu, Hawaii. It was the fifth annual Diamond Head Classic tournament and was part of the 2013–14 NCAA Division I men's basketball season. No. 14-ranked Iowa State defeated Boise State 70–66 to win the tournament championship. DeAndre Kane was named the tournament's MVP.

== Bracket ==
* – Denotes overtime period

5th Place Game; December 25
Oregon State	73
Hawai'i	79
7th Place Game; December 25
George Mason	73
Saint Mary's	63

Consolation 2nd Round; December 23
George Mason	54
Oregon State	58
Saint Mary's	74
Hawai'i	76

First Round; December 22
17	Iowa State	79
George Mason	67
Oregon State	71
Akron	83
South Carolina	78
Saint Mary's	71
Boise State	62
Hawai'i	61

Semifinals; December 23
14	Iowa State	83
Akron	60
South Carolina	54
Boise State	80

Championship; December 25
14	Iowa State	70
Boise State	66
3rd Place Game; December 25
Akron	59
South Carolina	69

== All tournament team ==
Name	Position	College	Class
DeAndre Kane	G	Iowa State	SR
Anthony Drmic	SF	Boise State	JR
Georges Niang	F	Iowa State	SO
Melvin Ejim	SF	Iowa State	SR
Brandon Spearman	G	Hawai'i	SR
