= Big 12 Network =

Syndicated package of college sports telecasts

Big 12 Network Big XII Network
- Type: Live Syndicated college sports programming service
- Country: United States
- Availability: Mainly in central portions of the United States
- Owner: ESPN, Inc. (ESPN Events)
- Launch date: 1996 (under ESPN Plus branding); September 6, 2008; 18 years ago (under the Big 12 Network branding)
- Dissolved: March 15, 2014
- Picture format: 1080i 16:9 HDTV (since 2008); 480i 4:3 SDTV widescreen (1996–2008; 1996–2010 on some affiliates)
- Former affiliations: SEC TV, Longhorn Network, ESPN, ESPN2, ESPNews, ESPNU

The Big 12 Network (stylized as the Big XII Network) was a syndicated package featuring live broadcasts of College basketball events from the Big 12 Conference that was broadcast under that branding from 2008 until 2014. It was owned and operated by ESPN Plus, the syndication arm of ESPN, Inc., and was mainly shown in areas in the Big 12’s geographical footprint, along with other areas of the United States. Games were shown locally on broadcast stations, regional sports networks, as well as on ESPN Full Court, and WatchESPN.

== History ==
=== The Creative Sports/OCC merger and the ESPN Plus years ===
Beginning in 1996 after ESPN’s consolidation of Creative Sports (which ESPN owned since 1994) and OCC Sports (acquired from Ohlmeyer Communication Company), ESPN Plus (also known as ESPN Regional Television) assumed syndication rights to Big 12 Conference men’s basketball games after the Big 8 Conference and the Southwest Conference merged to create the Big 12. Raycom Sports previously had syndication rights to basketball and football games of both those conferences from the 1980s until that syndicator lost the Big 8 in 1993–94, and the Southwest Conference merged with the Big 8 to become the Big 12 Conference in 1996.

=== The new branding ===
Starting with the 2008–2009 season, all Big 12 Conference basketball game broadcasts from ESPN Plus began to be broadcast under the Big 12 Network branding.

=== Demise ===
After the first 18 years of the conference’s existence, the Big 12 Network ceased operations in 2014 as all rights to Big 12 Basketball moved to the ESPN family of networks (e.g. ESPN, ESPN2, ESPNU and ESPNews). Several Big 12 basketball games also moved to the Texas Longhorns-oriented Longhorn Network, which was a joint venture between ESPN and the University of Texas at Austin that operated from August 2011 until Texas and Oklahoma officially joined the SEC in July 2024. However, CBS Sports does choose to broadcast at least two to three Big 12 games under their NCAA on CBS branding.

== On-air personalities ==
=== College basketball ===
- Dave Armstrong – play-by-play commentator (2010–2013)
- Reid Gettys – color commentator (2010–2013)
- Mitch Holthus – play-by-play commentator (2010–2013)
- Bryndon Manzer – Big 12 Conference color commentator (2010–2013)
- Chris Piper – Big 12 Conference sideline reporter (2012–2013)
- Brad Sham – Big 12 Conference play-by-play (2010–2013)
- Jon Sundvold – Big 12 Conference color commentator (2010–2012)
- Rich Zvosec – Big 12 Conference sideline reporter (2012–2013)

== Availability ==
The Big 12 Network was available mainly in areas of the central United States, including much of Texas, Oklahoma, Kansas, eastern Nebraska, Iowa, Missouri, and western Arkansas. Other areas served by the Big 12 Network included parts of West Virginia, north-central and east-central Kentucky, Illinois, Indiana, Ohio, and southern Pennsylvania, especially during the 2012–2013 and 2013–2014 season. This was true because in 2012, Texas Christian University joined the Big 12 from the Mountain West Conference, and West Virginia University joined the Big 12 from the original Big East Conference. In spite of the University of Missouri (along with Texas A&M University) leaving the Big 12 to join the basketball-powerful Southeastern Conference in 2012, some stations in Missouri, especially in the Kansas City, Columbia, St. Louis, and Joplin markets, either kept the local rights to the Big 12 Network or lost them to another station in their home market.

In addition to the listed areas above, three independent stations in California also carried the syndication package. Throughout the 2008–2014 branding period, some Big 12 Network stations also broadcast football games from sister syndicator SEC TV, which provided Southeastern Conference football games to certain stations, most notably including KTXA/Dallas, Texas and KDOC-TV/Los Angeles, California, although KDOC also broadcast SEC TV basketball games on a limited schedule. This was especially true to some former Big 12 Network partners that switched to or altered to and from SEC TV broadcasts.

== Broadcast affiliates ==
The following over-the-air broadcast stations broadcast the Big 12 Network:

=== Arkansas ===
DMA	Station	Main affiliation (at time of Big 12 Network partnership)	Notes
Fort Smith/Fayetteville	KFTA-TV	Fox	
Fort Smith/Fayetteville	KNWA-DT2	Fox	In-market repeater of KFTA-TV
Little Rock	KASN	The CW	affiliate until 2012
Little Rock	KARZ	MyNetworkTV	Affiliate from 2012 to 2014

=== California ===
DMA	Station	Main affiliation (at time of Big 12 Network partnership)	Notes
Los Angeles	KDOC-TV	Independent	Affiliated 2011–2014
San Diego	KUSI-TV	Independent	Big 12 Network was aired on a limited schedule on KUSI due to SEC TV partnership; This station also serves Tijuana, Baja California, Mexico
San Francisco/Oakland	KOFY	Independent	

=== Idaho ===
DMA	Station	Main affiliation (at time of Big 12 Network partnership)	Notes
Boise	KTRV-TV	MyNetworkTV	Affiliate from 2013–2014

=== Illinois ===
DMA	Station	Main affiliation (at time of Big 12 Network partnership)	Notes
Chicago	WLS-DT2	Live Well Network	Ran Big 12 Network programming until 2012
Peoris/Bloomington	WAOE	MyNetworkTV	Ran Big 12 Network programming until 2012
Rockford	WTVO; WTVO-DT2	ABC; MyNetworkTV	Affiliation shared between two of WTVO’s main channel and DT2 subchannel

=== Indiana ===
DMA	Station	Main affiliation (at time of Big 12 Network partnership)	Notes
Evansville	WTVW	Fox (until 2011); Independent	Now an affiliate of The CW since 2013
Indianapolis	WHMB-TV	LeSEA	Became an affiliate in 2013
Indianapolis	WHMB-DT2	LeSEA	Alternate affiliate in 2013–2014
Indianapolis	WRTV-DT2	Hometown Sports Indiana	Alternate affiliate in 2013–2014
Indianapolis	WTTV	The WB (now The CW)	Affiliate until 2008; became a CBS affiliate in 2015; Licensed to Bloomington, Indiana
Kokomo	WTTK	The WB (now The CW)	Full-time satellite of WTTV/Bloomington; became a CBS affiliate

=== Iowa ===
DMA	Station	Main affiliation (at time of Big 12 Network partnership)	Notes
Cedar Rapids	KFXA	Fox	
Davenport	WQAD-TV	ABC	Licensed to Moline, Illinois
Des Moines	WOI-DT	ABC	Acquired from WHO-TV in 2008
Des Moines	WOI-DT2	Live Well Network	(now with Laff)
Ottumwa	KYOU-TV	FOX	
Sioux City	KPTH-DT2	MyNetworkTV/This TV	

=== Kansas ===
DMA	Station	Main affiliation (at time of Big 12 Network partnership)	Notes
Dodge City	KSAS-LP	Fox	Satellite of KSAS-TV/Wichita as part of the region-wide network, “Fox Kansas”
Garden City	KAAS-LP	Fox	Satellite of KSAS-TV/Wichita as part of the region-wide network, “Fox Kansas”
Great Bend	KOCW	Fox	Satellite of KSAS-TV/Wichita as part of the region-wide network, “Fox Kansas”
Salina	KAAS-TV	Fox	Satellite of KSAS-TV/Wichita as part of the region-wide network, “Fox Kansas”
Topeka	KTMJ-CD	Fox	Relays signal to translators KMJT-LP/Ogden, KETM-LP/Emporia, and KTLJ-CD/Junction City
Wichita	KSAS-TV	Fox	Flagship station of the Fox Kansas regional network

=== Kentucky ===
DMA	Station	Main affiliation (at time of Big 12 Network partnership)	Notes
Campbellsville (Louisville)	WBKI-TV	The CW	Affiliate 2012–2014; OTA signal also serves portions of the Bowling Green market by default, and also reaches parts of the Lexington market
Lexington	WTVQ-DT2	MyNetworkTV	Affiliate 2012–2014
Louisville	WMYO-DT3	The CW	Simulcast of WBKI-TV/Campbellsville since 2012
Paducah	WDKA	MyNetworkTV	Simulcast on KBSI-DT2/Cape Girardeau, Missouri; both KBSI and WDKA shared Big 12 Network affiliation until 2012

=== Michigan ===
DMA	Station	Main affiliation (at time of Big 12 Network partnership)	Notes
Lansing	WHTV	MyNetworkTV	Big 12 Network partner 2012–2014; licensed to Jackson, Michigan

=== Mississippi ===
DMA	Station	Main affiliation (at time of Big 12 Network partnership)	Notes
Meridian	WTOK-TV; WTOK-DT2	ABC; MyNetworkTV	Affiliate 2011–2014

=== Missouri ===
DMA	Station	Main affiliation (at time of Big 12 Network partnership)	Notes
Cape Girardeau	KBSI	Fox	Alternating affiliation with MyNetworkTV outlet WDKA/Paducah, KY until 2012
Columbia-Jefferson City	KMIZ-TV	ABC	Primary affiliate in Columbia until 2012
Columbia-Jefferson City	KZOU-LP	MyNetworkTV	Alternate affiliate in Columbia until 2012
Columbia-Jefferson City	KQFX-LD	Fox	Alternate affiliate in Columbia until 2012
Joplin, MO-Pittsburg, KS	KFJX	Fox	
Kansas City, MO-KS	KSHB-TV	NBC	
Kansas City, MO-KS	KMCI-TV	Independent	Alternate affiliate in the Kansas City DMA
Springfield	KYTV	NBC	
Springfield	K15CZ	The CW	Full-power simulcast on KSPR-DT2
St. Louis	KTVI-DT2	Antenna TV	Was a This TV affiliate when KTVI-DT2 first affiliated with the Big 12 Network

=== Nebraska ===
DMA	Station	Main affiliation (at time of Big 12 Network partnership)	Notes
Lincoln	KLKN	ABC	Affiliate until 2012
Omaha	KXVO	The CW	
Omaha	KPTM-DT2	MyNetworkTV / This TV	Alternate affiliate

=== Ohio ===
DMA	Station	Main affiliation (at time of Big 12 Network partnership)	Notes
Toledo, Ohio	WMNT-CD	MyNetworkTV	
Youngstown	WYFX-LD	Fox	Affiliate from 2012 to 2014
Youngstown	WKBN-TV	CBS	Affiliate from 2012 to 2014

=== Oklahoma ===
DMA	Station	Main affiliation (at time of Big 12 Network partnership)	Notes
Oklahoma City	KAUT-TV	MyNetworkTV until 2012	Now an independent station
Oklahoma City	KOCB	The CW	Alternate affiliate for the OKC market
Tulsa	KMYT-TV	MyNetworkTV	

=== Pennsylvania ===
DMA	Station	Main affiliation (at time of Big 12 Network partnership)	Notes
Pittsburgh	WPXI-TV	NBC	Affiliate 2012–2014
State College-Altoona	WHVL-LP	MyNetworkTV	Affiliate 2012–2014

=== Puerto Rico ===
DMA	Station	Main affiliation (at time of Big 12 Network partnership)	Notes
Ponce	WTIN-TV	Independent	Satellite of WAPA-TV/San Juan; also ran some SEC TV content
San Juan	WAPA-TV	Independent	
Mayagüez	WNJX-TV	Independent	Satellite of WAPA-TV/San Juan; also ran some SEC TV content

=== Texas ===
DMA	Station	Main affiliation (at time of Big 12 Network partnership)	Notes
Abilene	KIDZ-LD	MyNetworkTV	
Amarillo	KCIT	Fox	
Amarillo	KCPN-LP	MyNetworkTV	Alternate affiliate; simulcast on full-powered KAMR-DT2
Austin	KBVO-TV	MyNetworkTV	
Austin	KBVO-CD	MyNetworkTV	Low-powered translator of KBVO-DT
Beaumont-Port Arthur	KBMT	ABC	
Beaumont-Port Arthur	KBMT-DT2	NBC	Branded as KJAC
Beaumont-Port Arthur	KUIL-LD	MyNetworkTV	Full-power simulcast on KBMT-DT5
Bryan-College Station	KBTX-TV	CBS	Big 12 Network partner until 2012; semi-satellite of KWTX-TV/Waco
Dallas-Fort Worth	KTXA	Independent	This station also broadcast football games from Big 12 Net’s sister service, SEC TV; now broadcasts Atlantic Coast Conference sports programming from Raycom Sports-operated ACC Network
Houston	KUBE	Independent	
Lubbock	KMYL-LD	MyNetworkTV	Now a satellite of KUPT/Hobbs, New Mexico
Odessa-Midland	KOSA-DT2	MyNetworkTV	
San Angelo	KIDY-DT2	MyNetworkTV	
San Antonio	KCWX	MyNetworkTV	
Sherman, Texas-Ada, OK	KXII-DT2	MyNetworkTV	
Tyler	KTPN-LD	MyNetworkTV	
Longview (Tyler)	KLPN-LD	MyNetworkTV	Satellite of KTPN-LD/Tyler, Texas
Waco-Temple-Bryan	KCEN-TV	NBC	affiliated from 2013 until 2014
Waco-Temple-Bryan	KCEN-DT2	Azteca America	Alternate Big 12 Network partner 2012–14; Now a Cozi TV affiliate
Waco-Temple-Bryan	KWTX-TV	CBS	Original affiliate until 2012

=== West Virginia ===
DMA	Station	Main affiliation (at time of Big 12 Network partnership)	Notes
Bluefield, WVA-VA	WOAY-TV	ABC	
Charleston-Huntington	WQCW-TV	The CW	Big 12 Net. Affiliate 2012–2014
Clarksburg	WVFX	FOX	
Parkersburg, WVA-Merietta, OH	WTAP-TV	NBC	Affiliate 2013–2014
Parkersburg, WVA-Merietta, OH	WTAP-DT3	MyNetworkTV	Affiliate of Big 12 Net (2012); Now defunct
Parkersburg, WVA-Merietta, OH	WIYE-LD	MyNetworkTV	Affiliate of Big 12 Net in 2013 and 2014
Wheeling, WVA-Steubenville	WTOV-TV	NBC	
Wheeling, WVA-Steubenville	WTOV-DT2	Me-TV	Alternate Big 12 Network partner; now a Fox affiliate

=== Wisconsin ===
DMA	Station	Main affiliation (at time of Big 12 Network partnership)	Notes
La Crosse-Eau Claire	KQEG-CA	ION Television/AMGTV	
Milwaukee	WMLW-TV	Independent	Affiliated 2012–2014

=== Wyoming ===
DMA	Station	Main affiliation (at time of Big 12 Network partnership)	Notes
Cheyenne	KGWN-TV	CBS	
Laramie	K19FX-D	CBS	Translator of KGWN-TV/Cheyenne

== Online platforms and Regional sports networks ==
Channel	Main affiliation	Service area via cable	Notes
Comcast/Charter Sports Southeast	Independent	Atlanta, Georgia	
Cox Sports	Independent	Varied areas (mainly within Cox Communications service areas)	
MC22	Independent	Varied areas (mainly within Mediacom service areas)	
Mid-Atlantic Sports Network	Independent	Maryland, Washington, D.C., Virginia, eastern and central North Carolina, West Virginia, south-central Pennsylvania, and Delaware	Available nationwide via Dish Network and DirecTV Satellite television
MASN2	Fox Sports Networks	Maryland, Washington, D.C., Virginia, eastern and central North Carolina, West Virginia, south-central Pennsylvania, and Delaware	Altetnate MASN feed
Altitude Sports and Entertainment	Independent	Colorado, Utah, Kansas, Montana, Nebraska, New Mexico, Nevada, South Dakota, Wyoming	Available nationwide via Dish Network and DirecTV
Altitude 2	Independent	Colorado, Utah, Kansas, Montana, Nebraska, New Mexico, Nevada, South Dakota, Wyoming	Alternate outlet of Altitude
Cox Sports Network	Independent	New Orleans, Louisiana	
ESPN3	ESPN	USA Nationwide (Cable and satellite subscribers only)	
ESPN Full Court	ESPN	USA Nationwide (Cable and satellite subscribers only)	
Pittsburgh Cable News Channel	Independent	Pittsburgh, Pennsylvania	
Time Warner Cable Sports Channel (Wisconsin)	Independent	Milwaukee and surrounding areas; Green Bay (northeast Wisconsin)	
AFN Sports	American Forces Network	United States Armed Forces	

== See also ==
- ESPN Events – previously known as ESPN Plus, and ESPN Regional Television (ERT)
- SEC TV – the ESPN Plus-operated syndication service of Southeastern Conference basketball and football
- SEC Network – the cable-exclusive SEC-dedicated network that launched in 2014
- Raycom Sports – the previous syndicator of Big 8, SWC, and SEC sporting events
  - ACC Network – Raycom Sports’ syndicated programming service that provided Atlantic Coast Conference basketball and football events
- American Sports Network – former ad hoc syndicated programming service of Sinclair Broadcasting Group
