= Wibu =

Wibu may refer to:

- KQEG-CD or WBOO
- Japanophilia or Weaboo
- Wibu-Systems software
