= KBMT =

Television station in Beaumont, Texas

- Beaumont–Port Arthur–Orange, Texas; United States
- City: Beaumont, Texas
- Channels: Digital: 12 (VHF); Virtual: 12
- Branding: 12.1: ABC 12; 12 News (newscasts); 12.2: NBC 12

Programming
- Affiliations: 12.1: ABC; 12.2: NBC; for others, see § Subchannels

Ownership
- Owner: Tegna Inc., a subsidiary of Nexstar Media Group; (LSB Broadcasting, Inc.)
- Sister stations: KUIL-LD

History
- First air date: May 9, 1954 (first incarnation); June 18, 1961 (second and current incarnation)
- Last air date: August 1, 1956 (first incarnation)
- Former channel numbers: Analog: 31 (UHF, 1954–1956), 12 (VHF, 1961–2009); Digital: 50 (UHF, until 2009)
- Former affiliations: NBC, DuMont, ABC (1954–1956); CBS (1954–1955); Dark (1956–1961)
- Call sign meaning: Beaumont

Technical information
- Licensing authority: FCC
- Facility ID: 10150
- ERP: 18 kW
- HAAT: 305 m (1,001 ft)
- Transmitter coordinates: 30°11′26″N 93°53′8″W
- Translator(s): KVHP-LD 34 Jasper, TX

Links
- Public license information: Public file; LMS
- Website: www.12newsnow.com

KBMT (channel 12) is a television station in Beaumont, Texas, United States, affiliated with ABC and NBC. It is owned by the Tegna subsidiary of Nexstar Media Group alongside low-power KUIL-LD (channel 12.5), an independent station with MyNetworkTV. The two stations share studios along I-10/US 69/US 96/US 287 in Beaumont; KBMT's transmitter is located in Mauriceville, Texas.

== History ==
The callsign KBMT originally transmitted on UHF channel 31, beginning on May 9, 1954, as the first television station to broadcast in the Golden Triangle. The station was owned by Television Broadcasters, Inc. whose stockholders were H. D. Williams and R. C. Reed with Reed as president. It carried NBC, DuMont Television Network and ABC as of November 1955; the station also carried CBS programming before KFDM-TV went on the air in April 1955. Since the FCC did not mandate television sets to have UHF included until 1964, channel 31 went off the air on August 1, 1956. Its original tower still stands (though only 250 feet (76 m) instead of 500 feet (152 m) tall) west of Vidor south of US 90.

KBMT's owners subsequently applied for the later allocation on channel 12 and, after winning the allocation from the FCC, began broadcasting on its new assigned channel using the KBMT callsign on June 18, 1961. The new KBMT took over the ABC affiliation which it retains today, after being relegated to limited clearances on KPAC-TV (now KBTV-TV) and KFDM-TV. This gave the Golden Triangle full-time affiliations for all three networks on the VHF dial in six years. The original owners were N.D. "Doug" Williams and Randolph Reed. The original tower site for the transmitter and antenna was Sabine Pass, south of Port Arthur (this to prevent co-channel interference with KSLA-TV in Shreveport). The transmitter and antenna were later moved to its current site near Mauriceville in the early 1960s with the antenna modified for a "directional" signal to prevent interference to KSLA's coverage area. The station was later sold to Cowles Broadcasting in 1965, the Channel 2 Television Company in 1970 and McKinnon Broadcasting in 1977.

On January 1, 2009, KBMT added NBC programming on digital subchannel 12.2. This came after KBTV, which previously held the affiliation, switched to Fox. This in turn caused former Fox affiliate KUIL-LP (now KUIL-LD) to go independent, although they pursued the NBC affiliation. The NBC subchannel is branded as K-JAC NBC, a nod to channel 4's former calls from 1965 to 1999. In a ten-year deal with London Broadcasting, KBMT began to manage KUIL's programming as well.

KBMT shut down its analog signal, over VHF channel 12, on June 12, 2009, the official date on which full-power television stations in the United States transitioned from analog to digital broadcasts under federal mandate. The station's digital signal relocated from its pre-transition UHF channel 50 to VHF channel 12 for post-transition operations.

Texas Telecasting, Inc. sold the station to London Broadcasting in August 2009. That channel was dropped in early 2013 in favor of MundoFox (now MundoMax). Due to a realignment, four digital channels are carried on the main 12 signal while the other two (12.5 and 12.6) are carried via the low-power stations, KBMT-LD on 43 SW of Beaumont and K36ID-D on 36 in Orange. In Jasper, KVHP-LD on 34 and in Warren, K27JJ-D on 27 carries the main RF12 signal with ABC, NBC, COZI and MeTV.

In May 2010, London Broadcasting revealed that the company was developing a state network, MYTX, using subchannels like KUIL's .2 (now KBMT-LD2) operated by KBMT. MYTX would share Texas news and sports and productions from 41 Entertainment, which is owned by London.

On May 14, 2014, Gannett announced its intent to purchase KBMT and five other stations from London Broadcasting. The sale was completed on July 8. By the middle of September 2014, Gannett had also purchased the four low-power digital signals mentioned above. On June 29, 2015, the Gannett Company split in two, with one side specializing in print media and the other side specializing in broadcast and digital media. KBMT and the low-power digital signals were retained by the latter company, named Tegna.

Nexstar Media Group acquired Tegna in a deal announced in August 2025 and completed on March 19, 2026.

== Newscasts ==
12 News logo.

KBMT launched its news operation in 1962. On September 16, 2009, several changes occurred in the newscast lineup. The weekday morning show, Good Morning Southeast Texas, began simulcasting on both the ABC and NBC channels while becoming a full two-hour broadcast. There began to be a half-hour newscast weekday mornings at 11:30 on KBMT-DT2. The NBC channel also launched a weeknight show at 6:30 and begin to simulcast the main channel's weeknight 10 p.m. news. Originally, there was only a separate short news and weather update at that time. KBMT-DT2 does not offer local newscasts on weekends unlike the main channel. On April 28, 2010, KBMT became the first in the market to air local news in high definition.

=== Notable former staff ===
- Van Earl Wright – sports anchor
- John Ireland – sports anchor
- John Hambrick – newscaster
- Bill Macatee
- Ben McCain
- Tom Terry – meteorologist

== Technical information ==
=== Subchannels ===
The station's signal is multiplexed:

Subchannels of KBMT
| Channel | Res. | Short name | Programming |
|---|---|---|---|
| 12.1 | 720p | KBMT-HD | ABC |
| 12.2 | 1080i | K-JACHD | NBC |
| 12.3 | 480i | Cozi | Cozi TV |
| 12.4 | 480i | MeTV | MeTV |
| 12.7 | 480i | Crime | True Crime Network |
| 12.8 | 480i | Quest | Quest |
| 12.16 | 480i | 365NET | 365BLK |

=== Translator ===
| City of license | Callsign | Channel | ERP | HAAT | Facility ID | Transmitter coordinates |
|---|---|---|---|---|---|---|
| Jasper | KVHP-LD | 34 | 15 kW | 170.3 m (559 ft) | 168235 | 30°58′32″N 93°59′25″W |
