= Giles Panton =

Canadian actor (born 1982)

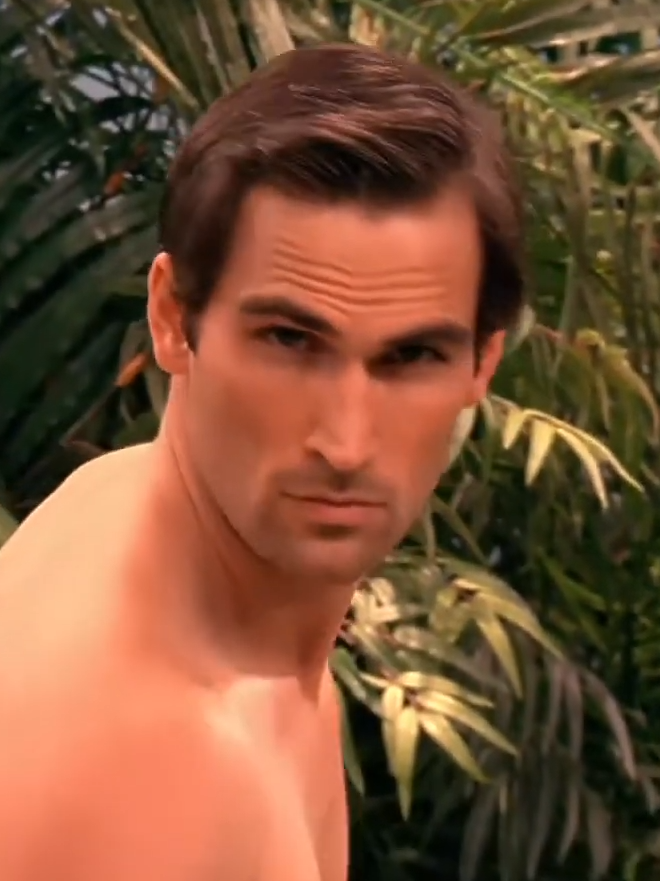
- Panton in Mr. Young
- Born: September 13, 1982 (age 44); Vancouver, British Columbia, Canada
- Occupation: Actor
- Years active: 2005–present
- Spouse: Jocelyn Panton (m. 2015)
- Website: gilespanton.ca

Giles Panton (born September 13, 1982) is a Canadian actor. He has worked in television, film, stage, and web media, and is also known for his voice-over work.

== Career ==
Giles Panton trained as an actor at the William Davis Centre of Vancouver's VanArts (Vancouver Institute of Media Arts), graduating in 2005. He has also studied at acting studios in New York.

Panton is the voice of Keith, a lead character in the Nicktoons series Voltron Force. He is also his role as detective Joe Wylee in Flash Gordon, and starred in the 2011 web series Soldiers of the Apocalypse as Twosev.

His first film was the 2005 short production, Bedridden. A later short film, On the Bus (2008) was presented at Oklahoma's Bare Bones International Film Festival in 2009.

Panton has also been active in Vancouver's alternate theatre scene. He was a headliner for Spectral Theatre Studio's 2009-10 season trio of paranormal plays, Deadends 666. And in 2006, he received the award for Best Performance by an Actor in a Supporting Role for his work in the I'm a Little Pickled Theatre Company production of The Book of Liz, by David Sedaris and Amy Sedaris.

In 2018, Panton joined the cast of The Man in the High Castle as the Nazi advertiser Billy Turner.

== Filmography ==
=== Film ===
| Year | Title | Role | Notes |
|---|---|---|---|
| 2005 | Bedridden | Jonathan | Short film |
| 2005 | Enough for Two | James | Short film |
| 2006 | Shock to the System | Bartender | |
| 2006 | Angelica's Pirate | Black Breath Wally | Short film |
| 2006 | Balloon and the Beast | Karl | Short film |
| 2006 | Happy Valentine's Day | Mr. Elias | Short film |
| 2007 | Glimpse | Narcissistic Man | Short film |
| 2008 | Class Savage | Hiker | Short film |
| 2008 | Nobody Special | Giles | Short film |
| 2008 | Nomansland | Driver | Short film |
| 2008 | On the Bus | Sean | Short film |
| 2009 | Damage | Rich Guy | |
| 2010 | Voodoo | Harold | Short film |
| 2015 | Sugar Babies | James | |
| 2017 | Bad Date Chronicles | Brad | |
| 2017 | Sleepwalking in Suburbia | Dan Miller | |
| 2017 | My Favorite Wedding | Dex Richmond | |
| 2018 | Christmas Pen Pals | Daniel Harrison | |
| 2021 | It Was Always You | George | |

=== Television ===
| Year | Title | Role | Notes |
|---|---|---|---|
| 2007 | Intelligence | Young Man | 2 episodes |
| 2007–2008 | Flash Gordon | Joe Wylee | 11 episodes |
| 2010 | Human Target | Roger | Episode: "Baptiste" |
| 2010 | V | V Nurse, V Technician | 3 episodes |
| 2010 | Smallville | Agent | Episode: "Sacrifice" |
| 2011–2012 | Voltron Force | Keith (voice) | Main cast (26 episodes) |
| 2014–2015 | Max Steel | Ven Ghan, Jake, Black Star Council Member (voice) | 10 episodes |
| 2015 | Cedar Cove | John Bowman | 4 episodes |
| 2015 | The Deep | Young Fisherman (voice) | Episode: "Here Be Dragons" |
| 2015–2016 | Gintama | Nobunobu Hitotsubashi (voice) | 6 episodes; English dub |
| 2015–2017 | Nexo Knights | Clay Moorington, Beast Master, Burnzie, Blok (voice) | 41 episodes |
| 2016 | Reign | Lord Cunningham | 2 episodes |
| 2017 | Max Steel: Turbo Charged | Snare (voice) | Television film |
| 2017 | Max Steel: Turbo Warriors | Snare, Night Howl (voice) | Television film |
| 2017 | Beat Bugs | Salvador Rat (voice) | Episode: "All Together Now" |
| 2017–2018 | My Little Pony: Friendship Is Magic | Flash Magnus (voice) | 3 episodes |
| 2017–2018 | Tarzan and Jane | Tarzan (voice) | 13 episodes |
| 2018 | Kong: King of the Apes | Lukas Remy, General Burke (voice) | 10 episodes |
| 2018–2019 | Chesapeake Shores | Chris Smith | 6 episodes |
| 2018–2019 | The Man in the High Castle | Billy Turner | 9 episodes |
| 2019–2021 | The Last Kids on Earth | Winged Wretches, Water Monster, Dementacle, Planetarium Narrator (voice) | 13 episodes |
| 2020 | Polly Pocket | Amusement Park Manager (voice) | Episode: "Carnival Caper" |
| 2020 | Lego Marvel Avengers: Climate Conundrum | Iron Man, A.I.M. Soldier (voice) | Miniseries |
| 2021 | Ninjago | Kalmaar (voice) | 13 episodes |
| 2022 | Legends of Tomorrow | Harris Ledes | Episode: "Lowest Common Denominator" |
| 2022 | My Favorite Christmas Tree | Cody | Television film |
| 2023–2025 | Lego Dreamzzz | Masked Hero, Sandman, Claudius/Dreamsmasher (voice) | 27 episodes |
| 2023–2024 | Ninjago: Dragons Rising | Rapton, Imperium Narrator (voice) | 15 episodes |
| 2024 | Dead Dead Demon's Dededede Destruction | Nobuo Koyama, Hayakawa (voice) | English dub |
| 2026 | Smoking Behind the Supermarket with You | Sasaki (voice) | English dub |

=== Video games ===
| Year | Title | Role | Notes |
|---|---|---|---|
| 2016 | Dead Rising 4 | Darcy | |
| 2018 | Dragalia Lost | Joe, Kleimann | |
| 2018 | Far Cry 5 | Guy Marvel | |
| 2018 | Bless Online | Lahhab Akheeman, Swen Radrillo, Gerin, Gentril, Lachoele, Mateo, Additional Voices | |
| 2018 | NHL 19 | Ones Commentator | |

=== Miscellaneous ===
| Year | Title | Role | Notes |
|---|---|---|---|
| 2019 | Absolute Carnage: Marvel Ultimate Comics | Carnage, Norman Osborn (voice) | Motion comic |
| 2020 | Marvel Battleworld: Mystery of the Thanostones | Iron Man (voice) | Web series |
| 2021 | Marvel Battleworld: Treachery at Twilight | Iron Man (voice) | Web series |
| 2021 | Lego Marvel Avengers: Loki in Training | Iron Man, Crossbones (voice) | Web series |
| 2022 | Lego Marvel Avengers: Time Twisted | Iron Man (voice) | Web series |
