= KUIL-LD =

Television station in Beaumont, Texas

- Beaumont, Texas; United States
- Channels: Digital: 36 (UHF); Virtual: 12.5/12.6
- Branding: MYTX (pronounced "MyTex")

Programming
- Affiliations: 12.5: Independent with MyNetworkTV; for others, see § Subchannels

Ownership
- Owner: Tegna Inc., a subsidiary of Nexstar Media Group; (LSB Broadcasting, Inc.)
- Sister stations: KBMT

History
- First air date: 2003
- Former call signs: The former KUIL: KUIL-LP (2003–2009); KUIL-LD (2009–February 2018); KBMT-LD (February–August 2018); The current KUIL: K36ID-D (2006–February 2018)
- Former channel numbers: Analog: 64 (UHF, 2003–2009)
- Former affiliations: Fox (2003–2008); UPN (secondary, 2003–2006); Independent (2009–2010); MyNetworkTV (2010−c. 2013, now on LD5)

Technical information
- Licensing authority: FCC
- Facility ID: 168234
- Class: LD
- ERP: 15 kW
- HAAT: 155.6 m (510 ft)
- Transmitter coordinates: 30°11′26″N 93°53′8″W

Links
- Public license information: LMS
- Website: www.12newsnow.com

KUIL-LD (channel 12.5) is a low-power television station in Beaumont, Texas, United States. It is programmed primarily as an independent station, but maintains a secondary affiliation with MyNetworkTV. KUIL-LD is owned by the Tegna subsidiary of Nexstar Media Group alongside ABC/NBC affiliate KBMT (channel 12). The two stations share studios along I-10/US 69/US 96/US 287 in Beaumont; KUIL-LD's transmitter is located in Mauriceville, Texas.

== History ==
Former logo, until 2008

The station went on the air as KUIL-LD (the former KUIL) on analog channel 64 in 2003 as the market's first Fox affiliate. The station was originally owned by National Communications, owner of KVHP in Lake Charles, Louisiana. Prior to 2003, KVHP served Beaumont and Port Arthur as the local Fox affiliate, in addition to Lake Charles (due to its transmitter being located halfway between Beaumont and Lake Charles); KUIL was established as a way to provide local programming just for that region, plus alternate coverage of sports that are more relevant to the Beaumont market (such as Houston Texans and Dallas Cowboys football). At the outset, KUIL also held a secondary affiliation with UPN; when UPN and The WB merged into The CW, KFDM added The CW to its digital subcarrier channel, leaving KUIL as solely a Fox affiliate.

In November 2007, KUIL signed on a digital signal on channel 36 (K36ID-D, now KUIL-LD) near Orange, Texas, to help cover the Orange area where the analog 64 signal could not reach.

On October 24, 2008, it was announced that then-NBC affiliate KBTV-TV would become a Fox affiliate on January 1, 2009, indicating that KUIL lost the affiliation at that time. Despite early reports of KUIL pursuing the NBC affiliation, competing station KBMT would broadcast NBC programming on a digital subchannel. As a result, after the Fox affiliation ceased, KUIL became an independent station. To address the 10% of the schedule previously provided by Fox, the station began to add some local programming, some of which would be produced by Lamar University and additional sitcoms like Scrubs. The station adopted "The U" as its identity, using the same moniker and logo as unrelated station WCIU-TV in Chicago.

On August 3, 2010, the station launched Azteca América on a new 4th digital subchannel, becoming the first Spanish-language television station offered in the Golden Triangle.

In May 2010, London Broadcasting revealed that the company was developing a state network, MYTX, using subchannels like KUIL's .2 (now KBMT-LD .2) operated by KBMT. MYTX would share Texas news and sports and productions from 41 Entertainment, which was owned by London.

By April 2012, KBMT assumed operations of KUIL through a local service agreement with owner Blue Bonnet. The station at the time was a MyNetworkTV affiliate. Earlier in the year, KUIL had added MeTV. In May 2013, KBMT added another hour of 12News Daybreak to KUIL at 7 a.m., continuing the show from KBMT and KJAC. The call letters were changed to KBMT-LD on February 28, 2018; the KUIL-LD call sign was concurrently moved to K36ID-D. The license for KBMT-LD was canceled on August 10, 2018.

Nexstar Media Group acquired Tegna in a deal announced in August 2025 and completed on March 19, 2026.

== Technical information ==
=== Subchannels ===
The station's digital channel is multiplexed:

Subchannels of KUIL-LD
Channel	Res.	Short name	Programming
12.5	720p	MYTX	Independent with MyNetworkTV
12.6	480i	OPEN	Busted
12.9	480i	COURT	Outlaw (soon)
12.10	480i	Mystery	Ion Mystery
12.11	480i	Grit	Grit
12.12	480i	Laff	Laff
12.13	480i	Heroes	Heroes & Icons
12.14	480i	HSN	HSN
12.15	480i	QVC	QVC

On January 9, 2012, KUIL replaced Azteca América with classic television programming from MeTV on 12.4. As of February 2013, MeTV moved to KBMT-DT4.

In 2016, MundoMax signed off and was replaced with Light TV. On May 1, 2017, Light TV was replaced by Ion Television.

=== Analog-to-digital conversion ===
KUIL shut down its analog signal, over UHF channel 64, on November 27, 2009.

== See also ==
- KVHP
