= Tarzan and Jane (TV series) =

American television series

- Also known as: Edgar Rice Burroughs' Tarzan and Jane
- Genre: Animation; Adventure; Drama; Science fantasy
- Based on: Tarzan of the Apes by Edgar Rice Burroughs
- Developed by: Avi Arad
- Directed by: Jesse Lickman; Steve Ball
- Voices of: Giles Panton; Rebecca Shoichet; Marci T. House; Paul Dobson
- Composer: Allen Bohbot
- Country of origin: United States
- Original language: English
- No. of seasons: 2
- No. of episodes: 13

Production
- Executive producers: Avi Arad; Allen Bohbot
- Producer: Alexandra Bland
- Running time: 22 minutes
- Production companies: Arad Animation; 41 Entertainment; Arc Productions

Original release
- Network: Netflix
- Release: January 6, 2017 – October 12, 2018

Related
- Kong: King of the Apes

Tarzan and Jane (or Edgar Rice Burroughs' Tarzan and Jane) is an American animated television series, produced by Arad Animation and 41 Entertainment and animated by Arc Productions and is based on the 1912 novel Tarzan of the Apes by Edgar Rice Burroughs.

The first season streamed on Netflix on January 6, 2017. The second season streamed on October 12, 2018.

From December 13 to 21, 2019, the series reran on Discovery Family.

== Premise ==
Saved from a plane crash and given supernatural powers, a teenaged Tarzan joins forces with a brave city girl called Jane Porter to protect his jungle home from threats.

== Voice cast ==
- Giles Panton as Tarzan / John Clayton III and Jeremy
- Rebecca Shoichet as Jane Porter
- Marci T. House as Angela Porter
- Paul Dobson as Dr. Porter and Earl of Greystroke
- Michael Dobson as Clayton Greystroke
- Brian Dobson as Shopkeeper and Goon 4
- Doron Bell as Muviro Wazari and Shaman
- Kathleen Barr as Kala and Veronica Smythefield (episode 3-4), ICB agent (episode 4)
- Omari Newton as Chief Wazari
- Lee Tockar as King Kong
- Eden Gamliel as Emily
- Bradley Duffy as Boss
- Ian Hanlin as Goon 2
- Francisco Trujillo as Goon 1
- Sam Vincent as Staff Member

== Episodes ==
=== Series overview ===
Series overview
| Season | Episodes | Originally released |
|---|---|---|
| 1 | 8 | January 6, 2017 |
| 2 | 5 | October 12, 2018 |

=== Season 1 (2017) ===
| No. overall | No. in season | Title | Directed by | Written by | Original release date | Prod. code |
|---|---|---|---|---|---|---|
| 1 | 1 | "A Hero Is Born" | Jesse Lickman | Kaaren Lee Brown | January 6, 2017 | 1TAJ01 |
After being saved from a plane crash by Kala, baby Tarzan receives animal powers from medicine to heal.
| 2 | 2 | "Tarzan Meet Jane" | Jesse Lickman | Kaaren Lee Brown | January 6, 2017 | 1TAJ02 |
Now 15, Tarzan meets Jane, and they go swinging and calling out the yell. Afterwards, Tarzan is captured and brought to meet his grandfather in England.
| 3 | 3 | "In the Urban Jungle" | Jesse Lickman | Kaaren Lee Brown | January 6, 2017 | 1TAJ03 |
Tarzan tries to adjust to life in the city, including going to school.
| 4 | 4 | "Dangerous Rescue" | Jesse Lickman | Kaaren Lee Brown | January 6, 2017 | 1TAJ04 |
Tarzan and Jane try to find out who is smuggling animals from Africa.
| 5 | 5 | "The Betrayal" | Jesse Lickman | Sean Catherine Derek | January 6, 2017 | 1TAJ05 |
Tarzan meets his cousin, Clayton, when a warehouse catches fire.
| 6 | 6 | "By Air and by Sea" | Jesse Lickman | Sean Catherine Derek | January 6, 2017 | 1TAJ06 |
Illegal pesticides are found at Tarzan's grandfather's farm.
| 7 | 7 | "Chasing the Mastermind" | Jesse Lickman | Sean Catherine Derek | January 6, 2017 | 1TAJ07 |
Tarzan and Jane head to Morocco to try to find who is sabotaging Tarzan's grandfather.
| 8 | 8 | "Showdown in the Jungle" | Jesse Lickman | Sean Catherine Derek | January 6, 2017 | 1TAJ08 |
Tarzan tries to save Kala from the mastermind.

=== Season 2 (2018) ===
| No. overall | No. in season | Title | Directed by | Written by | Original release date | Prod. code |
|---|---|---|---|---|---|---|
| 9 | 1 | "That Day in Rio" | Steve Ball | Jesse Porter | October 12, 2018 | 2TAJ01 |
When they stumble into a poaching depot in Rio de Janeiro, Jane and Tarzan combine wit and strength to help free the animals from captivity.
| 10 | 2 | "Into the Rainforest" | Steve Ball | Danielle Wolff | October 12, 2018 | 2TAJ02 |
Tarzan and Jane travel deep into the forest to track down the poachers. But first, they must navigate the treacherous rapids of the Teles Pires River.
| 11 | 3 | "Too Much Monkey Business" | Steve Ball | Robert N. Skir | October 12, 2018 | 2TAJ03 |
After hearing the Kuro Anowi people's story, Tarzan and Jane set out in search of the poachers' base and find the ruins of a lost civilization.
| 12 | 4 | "The Ruins" | Steve Ball | Danielle Wolff | October 12, 2018 | 2TAJ04 |
Outwitting the guards inside the ruins, the plucky duo find their way to a control room and discover the scale of the global poaching scheme.
| 13 | 5 | "Return of the King" | Steve Ball | Robert N. Skir | October 12, 2018 | 2TAJ05 |
Tarzan and Jane encounter King Kong, and end up in Pellucidar.
