= Fox 29 =

Fox 29 may refer to one of the following television stations in the United States affiliated with the Fox Broadcasting Company:

== Current ==
- KABB in San Antonio, Texas
- KIMA-DT3, a digital subchannel of KIMA-TV in Yakima, Washington (brands as Fox Yakima 29.3)
- KVHP in Lake Charles, Louisiana
- WFLX in West Palm Beach, Florida
- WTXF-TV in Philadelphia, Pennsylvania (O&O)
- WUTV in Buffalo, New York

== Former ==
- WFTC in Minneapolis/Saint Paul, Minnesota (1988–2002)
- WMUR-LP in Littleton, New Hampshire (1995–2001)
