= KBTV-TV =

Television station in Port Arthur, Texas

- Port Arthur–Beaumont–Orange, Texas; United States
- City: Port Arthur, Texas
- Channels: Digital: 27 (UHF); Virtual: 4

Programming
- Affiliations: 4.1: Roar; for others, see § Subchannels

Ownership
- Owner: Sinclair Broadcast Group; (KBTV Licensee, LLC)
- Sister stations: KFDM

History
- First air date: October 22, 1957
- Former call signs: KPAC-TV (1957–1966); KJAC-TV (1966–1999)
- Former channel numbers: Analog: 4 (VHF, 1957–2009); Digital: 40 (UHF, 2002–2018)
- Former affiliations: NBC (1957–2009); ABC (secondary, 1957–1961); Fox (2009–2021); Dabl (2021–2025; moved to 4.5)
- Call sign meaning: "Beaumont Television"

Technical information
- Licensing authority: FCC
- Facility ID: 61214
- ERP: 1,000 kW
- HAAT: 252.8 m (829 ft)
- Transmitter coordinates: 30°9′20″N 93°59′10″W

Links
- Public license information: Public file; LMS
- Website: fox4beaumont.com

KBTV-TV (channel 4) is a television station licensed to Port Arthur, Texas, United States, serving the Beaumont area with programming from the digital multicast network Roar. It is owned by Sinclair Broadcast Group alongside CBS/CW+/Fox affiliate KFDM (channel 6). The two stations share studios on Walden Road in southwest Beaumont; KBTV-TV's transmitter is located in Vidor.

== History ==
Channel 4 signed on October 22, 1957, as KPAC-TV, a primary NBC affiliate owned by Texas Gulfcoast Television, Inc., itself jointly owned by Port Arthur College, owner of KPAC radio (1250 AM, now KDEI; and 98.5 FM, now KTJM), and the Jefferson Amusement Company. Channel 4 also aired ABC programming until KBMT-TV returned to the air this time on channel 12 in 1961 and became the market's exclusive affiliate. Port Arthur College sold its stake in the station to the Jefferson Amusement Company in 1965; as Port Arthur College retained the radio stations, channel 4 changed its call letters to KJAC-TV (the call letters were derived from the company's name). The callsign change occurred on January 20, 1966.

The station was the first in the area to broadcast in color, use video tape, and air live coverage of area high school football games. Among the original programming that originated at KPAC/KJAC's studios were wrestling, the kid's western show Cowboy John, afternoon Bingo, and the Circle 4 Club. During the 1950s, KPAC also had the only local teen dance program, Jive At Five. Both The Cowboy John Show and Jive At Five had "colored days", in which African Americans were permitted to participate.

Jefferson Entertainment Company sold KJAC to Clay Communications in 1973; As part of the divestiture of the company's newspaper and television properties, on April 30, 1987, Clay sold its KJAC and its four sister television stations—NBC affiliate KFDX-TV in Wichita Falls, and ABC affiliates WAPT in Jackson, Mississippi, and WWAY in Wilmington, North Carolina—to New York City–based Price Communications Corporation for $60 million; the sale was approved by the Federal Communications Commission (FCC) on June 23. On August 23, 1995, Price sold KJAC and fellow NBC affiliates KSNF-TV in Joplin, Missouri, and KFDX-TV to Wakefield, Rhode Island–based upstart USA Broadcast Group for $42 million, retaining ABC affiliate WHTM-TV in Harrisburg, Pennsylvania, as its sole television property (USA soon renamed itself to U.S. Broadcast Group after USA Network filed a copyright infringement complaint against the broadcasting company).

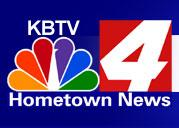
KBTV's last logo as an NBC affiliate; several versions of this logo were used from when the station became KBTV in 1999 until affiliating with Fox in 2009.

On January 12, 1998, Irving-based Nexstar Broadcasting Group acquired KFDX-TV, KBTV-TV and KSNF from U.S. Broadcast Group for $64.3 million. In 1999, the station took its present KBTV-TV callsign to align itself more with Beaumont, even though it is still licensed to Port Arthur. The call letters had previously been used by channel 9 in Denver (now KUSA) and channel 8 in Dallas (now WFAA). KBTV-TV also shares its call letters with KBTV-CD channel 51 in Sacramento, California. To go along with the call change, KBTV moved from its Port Arthur studios to studios inside Parkdale Mall in Beaumont, where it remained until it moved to KFDM's studios in April 2013. The station was one of the few television stations in the country to have studios located inside a major shopping center.

KBTV's first "Fox 4" logo, used from 2009 until 2014

In October 2008, Nexstar reached an agreement with Fox in which KBTV would become the new Fox affiliate for the Beaumont market. The move was made because Nexstar wanted to increase KBTV's news output. The affiliation switch took effect on January 1, 2009, ending KBTV's 51-year affiliation with NBC. This caused a shakeup in the market as the NBC affiliation moved to a digital subchannel of ABC affiliate KBMT, while KUIL-LP (a former satellite of Lake Charles–based KVHP), which lost Fox, went independent at that time. The now-KUIL-LD has since become operated by KBMT and affiliated with MyNetworkTV. With this switch, KBTV became the third Fox affiliate to serve southeastern Texas after both KVHP (which served as the network's affiliate of record for the Beaumont area for the network's first sixteen years of existence) and KUIL-LP.

On February 2, 2009, at 2 p.m., a fire destroyed KBTV's old studios in Port Arthur at 2900 17th Street, a mere 12 hours from giving control to Nexstar's master control hub in Little Rock, Arkansas. ATF investigated and no suspect has ever been found. Originally the station's home from its 1957 sign-on until 1999, the building primarily served after the move as a storage facility, though the station's doppler weather radar was still based there. The building was demolished a few months later.

Nexstar filed to sell off KBTV-TV to Deerfield Media on August 22, 2012, making this Nexstar's first divestiture in the company's history. Upon the deal's completion on December 3, 2012, the station entered into a joint sales agreement and a shared services agreement with Sinclair Broadcast Group, making it a sister station to CBS affiliate KFDM.

On May 8, 2017, Sinclair announced that it would be acquiring Tribune Media in an all-cash transaction valued at $3.9 billion. Had it received regulatory approval from the FCC and the U.S. Department of Justice's Antitrust Division, KBTV would have gained two more sister stations, Dallas CW affiliate KDAF and Houston CW affiliate KIAH. The deal was canceled by Tribune in August 2018.

On January 1, 2021, Sinclair began to migrate KBTV's Fox programming to a subchannel of KFDM; the transition period ended on February 1, 2021, with KBTV switching its primary subchannel to Dabl.

KBTV's last logo as a Fox affiliate, used from 2014 until 2021

On July 28, 2021, the FCC issued a Forfeiture Order against Deerfield Media stemming from a lawsuit involving KBTV-TV. The lawsuit, filed by AT&T, alleged that Deerfield Media failed to negotiate for retransmission consent in good faith for KBTV and other Sinclair-managed stations. Deerfield was ordered to pay a fine of $512,228 per station named in the lawsuit, including KBTV.

On July 1, 2025, Sinclair announced that it would acquire KBTV outright, creating a legal duopoly with KFDM. The sale was completed on August 18.

On August 1, 2025, Roar was moved from KBTV's second to the first digital subchannel. Dabl was moved to the fifth digital subchannel, while Charge! was moved to Roar's former subchannel position on 4.2.

== News operation ==
As a Fox affiliate, KBTV carried a total of 23 1/2 hours of local newscasts each week (4 1/2 hours each weekday and a half-hour each on Saturdays and Sundays).

After KBTV affiliated with Fox, news was expanded from 1 1/2 to three hours on weekday mornings, and the half-hour 5 and 6 p.m. newscasts were canceled and replaced with an hour-long 4 p.m. newscast. It also discontinued its 10 p.m. newscast, and moved it to 9 p.m. (and expanding it to one hour on weeknights), although some Fox affiliates in other markets maintain newscasts at both 9 and 10 p.m. KBTV had the distinction of being one of the smallest, if not the smallest Fox affiliate (in terms of market size) to carry late afternoon newscasts.

In September 2010, the 4 p.m. newscast was changed to a news/lifestyle format called Southeast Texas Live and a 5:30 p.m. newscast also debuted.

== Technical information ==
=== Subchannels ===
The station's signal is multiplexed:

Subchannels of KBTV-TV
Channel	Res.	Short name	Programming
4.1	480i	ROAR	Roar
4.2	480i	Charge!	Charge!
4.3	480i	Comet	Comet
4.4	480i	TheNest	The Nest
4.5	480i	Dabl	Dabl

=== Analog-to-digital conversion ===
KBTV-TV shut down its analog signal, over VHF channel 4, on June 12, 2009, the official date on which full-power television stations in the United States transitioned from analog to digital broadcasts under federal mandate. The station's digital signal remained on its pre-transition UHF channel 40. Through the use of PSIP, digital television receivers display the station's virtual channel as its former VHF analog channel 4.
