= Avi Arad =

Israeli-American film and television producer (born 1948)

- אבי ארד
- Arad at the 2013 San Diego Comic-Con
- Born: August 1, 1948 (age 78); Ramat Gan, Israel
- Education: Hofstra University (BBA)
- Occupations: Film producer; Television producer; Studio executive
- Years active: 1990–present
- Spouse: Joyce Arad
- Children: 3
- Military career
- Allegiance: Israel
- Branch: Israel Defense Forces
- Service years: 1965–1968
- Conflicts: Six-Day War (WIA)

Avi Arad (/ˈɑːvi ˈɑːrɑːd/; Hebrew: אבי ארד; born August 1, 1948) is an Israeli-American studio executive and producer of film, television and animation. He became the CEO of Toy Biz in the 1990s, was the chief creative officer of Marvel Entertainment and is the founder, former chairman and former CEO of the latter's successor, Marvel Studios. He has produced and sometimes written a wide array of live-action, animated, and television comic book adaptations.

== Early life ==
Arad was born on August 1, 1948 in Ramat Gan, Israel, to a Jewish family. The son of Holocaust survivors from Poland, he grew up reading Superman and Spider-Man comics translated into Hebrew. In 1965, he was conscripted as a soldier into the Israel Defense Forces (IDF). He fought and was wounded in the 1967 Six-Day War, and spent 15 months recuperating. Arad finished his military service in 1968.

In 1970, Arad moved to the United States and enrolled at Hofstra University to study industrial management. He worked as a truck driver and as a Hebrew teacher to put himself through college, and graduated with a BBA from Hofstra's Frank G. Zarb School of Business in 1972.

== Career ==
=== Marvel Comics ===
Along with Israeli-American Toy Biz co-owner Isaac Perlmutter, Avi Arad came into conflict with Carl Icahn and Ron Perelman over control of Marvel Comics in the wake of its 1996 bankruptcy. In the end, Arad and Perlmutter came out on top, with Toy Biz taking over Marvel Comics in a complicated deal that included obtaining the rights to Spider-Man and other superheroes that Marvel had sold earlier. He was involved in Marvel's emergence from bankruptcy and the expansion of the company's profile through licensing and movies.

=== Arad Productions ===
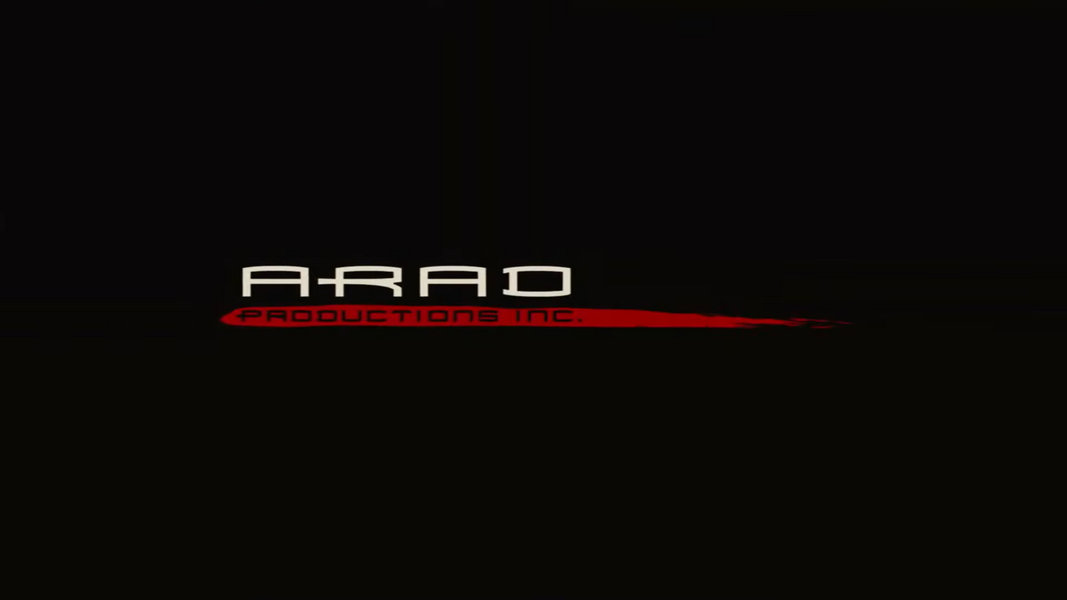
Logo used since 2007

On May 31, 2006, Arad resigned his various Marvel positions, including his leadership of Marvel Studios, to form his own production company, Arad Productions (also known as Arad Animation), a company that primarily produces Marvel-licensed films separate from the Marvel Cinematic Universe. His first non-Marvel film was 2007's Bratz. Further ventures include manga adaptation Ghost in the Shell; an adaptation of Brandon Mull's teenage fantasy Fablehaven (which died in production); an adaptation of James Patterson's teenage novel Maximum Ride; and adaptations of video game properties Uncharted, Infamous, Metal Gear Solid, and The Legend of Zelda.

=== Production I.G ===
In August 2010, it was announced that Arad was given a chair with the American branch of animation studio Production I.G in Los Angeles, California.

== Filmography ==
=== Feature films ===
Year	Title	Executive Producer	Producer
1998	Blade	Yes	No
2000	X-Men	Yes	No
2002	Blade II	Yes	No
2002	Spider-Man	Yes	No
2003	Daredevil	No	Yes
2003	X2	Yes	No
2003	Hulk	No	Yes
2004	The Punisher	No	Yes
2004	Spider-Man 2	No	Yes
2004	Blade: Trinity	Yes	No
2005	Elektra	No	Yes
2005	Man-Thing (TV film)	No	Yes
2005	Fantastic Four	No	Yes
2006	X-Men: The Last Stand	No	Yes
2007	Ghost Rider	No	Yes
2007	Spider-Man 3	No	Yes
2007	The Killing Floor	Yes	No
2007	Fantastic Four: Rise of the Silver Surfer	No	Yes
2007	Bratz	No	Yes
2008	Iron Man	No	Yes
2008	The Incredible Hulk	No	Yes
2011	Ghost Rider: Spirit of Vengeance	No	Yes
2012	The Amazing Spider-Man	No	Yes
2013	Robosapien: Rebooted	No	Yes
2014	The Amazing Spider-Man 2	No	Yes
2015	Gamba: Ganba to nakamatachi	Yes	No
2017	Ghost in the Shell	No	Yes
2017	Spider-Man: Homecoming	Yes	No
2018	Venom	No	Yes
2018	Spider-Man: Into the Spider-Verse	No	Yes
2019	Spider-Man: Far From Home	Yes	No
2021	Venom: Let There Be Carnage	No	Yes
2021	Spider-Man: No Way Home	Yes	No
2022	Uncharted	No	Yes
2022	Morbius	No	Yes
2023	Spider-Man: Across the Spider-Verse	No	Yes
2024	Borderlands	No	Yes
2024	Venom: The Last Dance	No	Yes
2024	Kraven the Hunter	No	Yes
2026	Spider-Man: Brand New Day	No	Yes
2027	The Legend of Zelda	No	Yes
2027	Spider-Man: Beyond the Spider-Verse	No	Yes

=== Direct-to-video ===
Year	Title	Executive Producer	Writer
2006	Ultimate Avengers: The Movie	Yes	No
2006	Ultimate Avengers 2: Rise of the Panther	Yes	No
2007	The Invincible Iron Man	Yes	Story
2007	Doctor Strange: The Sorcerer Supreme	Yes	No

=== Television ===
Year	Title	Executive Producer	Creator	Notes
1992	King Arthur and the Knights of Justice	Yes	No	
1993–1994	Double Dragon	Yes	No	
1993	The Bots Master	Yes	No	
1993–1997	X-Men: The Animated Series	Yes	No	
1994	Iron Man	Yes	No	
1994	Fantastic Four	Yes	No	
1994–1998	Spider-Man: The Animated Series	Yes	No	Also story writer of episode "The Alien Costume, Part 1"
1996–1997	The Incredible Hulk	Yes	No	
1996	Generation X	Yes	No	TV pilot
1998	Silver Surfer	Yes	No	
1998	Nick Fury: Agent of S.H.I.E.L.D.	Yes	No	TV movie
1999–2001	Spider-Man Unlimited	Yes	Developer	
1999–2000	The Avengers: United They Stand	Yes	No	
2000–2003	X-Men: Evolution	Yes	No	Also story writer of episode "Strategy X"
2001–2004	Mutant X	Yes	Yes	
2003	Spider-Man: The New Animated Series	Yes	No	
2006	Blade: The Series	Yes	No	
2006	Fantastic Four: World's Greatest Heroes	Yes	No	Also story writer of episode "Molehattan"
2008	Iron Man: Armored Adventures	Yes	No	
2008	The Spectacular Spider-Man	Yes	No	Episode "Survival of the Fittest"
2009	Wolverine and the X-Men	Yes	No	
2013–2015	Pac-Man and the Ghostly Adventures	Yes	Developer	
2016–2018	Kong: King of the Apes	Yes	Developer	
2017–2018	Tarzan and Jane	Yes	Developer	
2017–2018	Super Monsters	Yes	Yes	
2024–present	X-Men '97	Consulting	No	
