= DeAndre Kane =

American-Hungarian basketball player (born 1989)

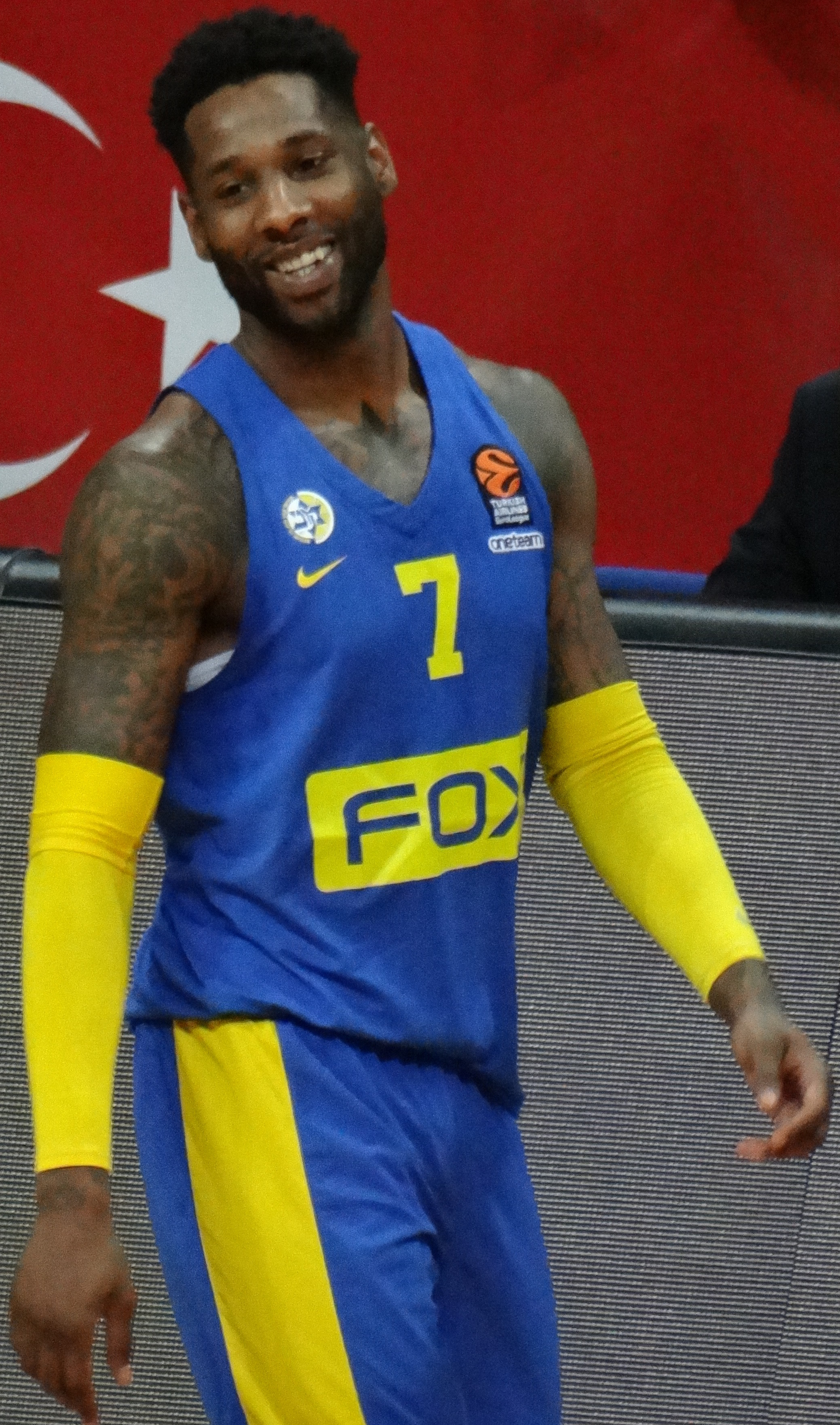
- Kane with Maccabi Tel Aviv in March 2018

Grindavík
- Position: Shooting guard / small forward
- League: Úrvalsdeild karla

Personal information
- Born: June 10, 1989 (age 37) Pittsburgh, Pennsylvania, U.S.
- Listed height: 6 ft 5 in (1.96 m)
- Listed weight: 200 lb (91 kg)

Career information
- High school: Schenley (Pittsburgh, Pennsylvania); The Patterson School (Lenoir, North Carolina)
- College: Marshall (2010–2013); Iowa State (2013–2014)
- NBA draft: 2014: undrafted
- Playing career: 2014–present

Career history
- 2014: Krasny Oktyabr
- 2014–2015: Antwerp Giants
- 2015: Ulm
- 2016: Hapoel Eilat
- 2016–2017: Nizhny Novgorod
- 2017: Real Betis
- 2017–2019: Maccabi Tel Aviv
- 2020: Mega Basket
- 2020: Peristeri
- 2023–present: Grindavík

Career highlights
- Icelandic League champion (2026); 2× Israeli League champion (2018, 2019); Israeli League Cup winner (2017); Third-team All-American – SN (2014); First-team All-Big 12 (2014); 2× Second-team All-Conference USA (2012, 2013); Conference USA Freshman of the Year (2011)

DeAndre Kane (born June 10, 1989) is an American-born Hungarian professional basketball player for Grindavík in the Úrvalsdeild karla. He played college basketball at Marshall University and Iowa State University before playing professionally in Russia, Belgium, Germany, Israel, Spain and Serbia.

== College career ==
A 6'5" shooting guard from Pittsburgh, Pennsylvania, Kane spent his first three collegiate seasons at Marshall University. After sitting out the 2009–10 season as a partial academic qualifier, Kane was named the Conference USA Freshman of the Year in 2010–11 after averaging 15.1 points and 3.4 assists per game. For the next two years, Kane was named to the All-conference second team. In 2011–12, he helped the Herd to the championship game in Conference USA, including setting a record of 40 points scored in a second-round, triple-overtime win over Tulsa, before the Herd fell to the Memphis Tigers at the FedEx Forum in Memphis under Coach Tom Herrion.

After graduating from Marshall, he was immediately eligible to play as a transfer at Iowa State. Kane was named to the midseason Wooden Award top 25 watch list for National Player of the Year. On February 13, he was named one of the 30 finalists for Naismith College Player of the Year. The Sporting News named him a third team All-American.

== Professional career ==
=== 2014–15 season ===
Despite impressive workouts and a solid college career, Kane went unselected in the 2014 NBA draft. In July 2014, he joined the Los Angeles Lakers for the 2014 NBA Summer League. On September 11, he signed with the Krasny Oktyabr of Russia for the 2014–15 season. On November 5, he was released by the team after appearing in just six games. On November 17, he signed with the Antwerp Giants of Belgium for the rest of the season.

=== 2015–16 season ===
In July 2015, Kane joined the Atlanta Hawks for the 2015 NBA Summer League. On July 30, he signed with ratiopharm Ulm of Germany for the 2015–16 season. On December 8, he parted ways with Ulm after appearing in eleven league games and eight EuroCup games. On January 2, 2016, he signed with the Israeli club Hapoel Eilat for the rest of the season.

=== 2016–17 season ===
On July 26, 2016, Kane signed with Russian club Nizhny Novgorod for the 2016–17 season. On January 4, 2017, Kane recorded a career-high 31 points, shooting 13-of-16 from the field, along with nine rebounds and two assists in a 113–105 win over Zenit Saint Petersburg. On March 3, 2017, he parted ways with Nizhny. The next day, he signed with Spanish club Real Betis Energía Plus for the rest of the 2016–17 ACB season.

=== 2017–18 season ===
On July 24, 2017, Kane signed with Israeli club Maccabi Tel Aviv for the 2017–18 season. On March 22, 2018, Kane recorded a season-high 19 points, shooting 7-of-9 from the field, along with nine rebounds, five assists, and three steals in a 75–76 loss to Panathinaikos. Kane went on to win the 2017 Israeli League Cup and the 2018 Israeli League Championship titles with Maccabi.

=== 2018–19 season ===
On July 8, 2018, Kane signed a one-year contract extension with Maccabi. Kane won the 2019 Israeli League Championship with Maccabi, winning his second straight Israeli League title in the process.

=== 2019–20 season ===
On February 5, 2020, Kane signed with the Serbian team Mega Bemax of the ABA League. Two days later, he made a debut for Mega in a 87–76 win over Cibona, recording 14 points, 5 rebounds and 3 assists. On February 8, Kane parted ways with Mega to join the Greek BCL side Peristeri for the rest of the season.

=== Grindavík ===
In May 2023, Kane signed with Grindavík of the Úrvalsdeild karla. During the regular season, he averaged 20.3 points, 6.4 rebounds and 3.7 assists per game, helping Grindavík finish with the second best record in the league. After scoring 28 points in the first game of Grindavík's first round playoff series against defending champions Tindastóll, Kane was suspended for game two by the Icelandic Basketball Association disciplinary and ruling committee. Initially suspended for two games for remarks to a referee following Grindavík's loss against Stjarnan on 28 March 2024, the case was re-evaluated after it was discovered that Grindavík had not been properly informed of the case and the suspension was eventually reduced to one game. After helping Grindavík reach the Úrvalseild finals, where the team lost 2–3 to Valur, he signed a contract extension through the 2024–25 season.

On 18 May 2026, he won his first Icelandic championship after Grindavík defeated Tindastóll in the Úrvalsdeild finals, 3–1.

== The Basketball Tournament ==
Kane was a member of Overseas Elite, a professional team competing in The Basketball Tournament (TBT), a winner-take-all single-elimination tournament. In TBT 2016, Kane averaged 9.2 PPG and 4.0 RPG as Overseas Elite took home the $2 million prize. In TBT 2017, Kane averaged 9.3 PPG and 3.3 RPG as Overseas Elite successfully defended their title, defeating Team Challenge ALS in the championship game, 86–83. In TBT 2018, Kane averaged 6.0 PPG and 3.3 RPG on 54 percent shooting. Overseas Elite reached the championship game and defeated Eberlein Drive, 70–58, again claiming the $2 million prize. In TBT 2019, Kane and Overseas Elite advanced to the semifinals where they suffered their first-ever defeat, losing to Carmen's Crew, 71–66. Kane did not play for Overseas Elite during TBT 2020; the team lost in the semifinals.

For TBT 2021, with Overseas Elite not entering the tournament, Kane joined Boeheim's Army, a team rostered primarily with Syracuse Orange men's basketball alumni. Boeheim's Army captured the championship and $1 million prize.

== Personal life ==
On June 1, 2017, Kane became a Hungarian dual citizen.

Kane is married and has two children with his wife. He also has a son, which he was made aware of when the child was 7 years old.

On May 29, 2026, Kane was arrested after landing at Pittsburgh International Airport for owing US$100,000 in unpaid child support fees after not showing up to family court. He had lived overseas playing professional basketball since 2014, most recently living in Iceland.

== Career statistics ==
Legend
GP	Games played	GS	Games started	MPG	Minutes per game
FG%	Field-goal percentage	3P%	3-point field-goal percentage	FT%	Free-throw percentage
RPG	Rebounds per game	APG	Assists per game	SPG	Steals per game
BPG	Blocks per game	PPG	Points per game	PIR	Performance index rating
**Bold**	Career high

=== EuroLeague ===
Year	Team	GP	GS	MPG	FG%	3P%	FT%	RPG	APG	SPG	BPG	PPG	PIR
2017–18	Maccabi	**30**	18	23.3	**.511**	.289	**.515**	**4.0**	2.1	.9	**.3**	7.4	**9.8**
2018–19	Maccabi	25	**24**	**25.7**	.433	**.310**	.407	3.8	**2.6**	**1.1**	.1	**8.0**	8.6
Career		55	42	24.3	.471	.303	.467	3.9	2.3	1.0	.2	7.7	9.2

=== College statistics ===
Year	Team	GP	GS	MPG	FG%	3P%	FT%	RPG	APG	SPG	BPG	PPG
2010–11	Marshall	34	34	31.6	.428	.318	.633	5.6	3.4	.9	.1	15.1
2011–12	Marshall	34	33	34	.414	.250	.599	5.4	3.5	1.4	**.3**	16.5
2012–13	Marshall	28	25	**37.1**	.403	.248	.521	4.4	**7.0**	**1.8**	.2	15.1
2013–14	Iowa State	**36**	**36**	34.4	**.483**	**.398**	**.635**	**6.8**	5.9	1.2	**.3**	**17.1**
Career		132	128	34.2	.432	.301	.602	5.6	4.9	1.3	.2	16.0

Source: Sports-Reference
