= 41 Entertainment =

American animation company

41 Entertainment LLC
- Type: Private
- Industry: Entertainment
- Genre: Kids and Family Entertainment
- Predecessor: BKN International
- Founded: January 7, 2010; 16 years ago
- Founder: Allen Bohbot
- Headquarters: Greenwich, Connecticut United States
- Area served: Worldwide
- Key people: Kiersten Halstead (Vice president for creative services, development, acquisitions); Nancy Koff (Vice president for sales and marketing); Pat Venti (Administrative vice president)
- Products: Television production, distribution
- Subsidiaries: Super Monsters Animation LLC, T&J Animation LLC, Kong-King of the Apes LLC, SMASH Animation LLC, Shooting Star Animation LLC, TWA Animation LLC, BKN Entertainment LLC
- Website: http://www.41e.tv

41 Entertainment LLC (41E) is a privately held American animation studio that develops, produces, and distributes popular television shows. Allen Bohbot is the founder and managing director of 41E.

== History ==
Allen Bohbot founded Bohbot Entertainment (BKN) and various subsidiaries such as BKN International in the 1990s and 41 Entertainment on January 7, 2010.

In September 2011, 41E was appointed by Namco Bandai Games, to distribute worldwide the new series Pac-Man 3D, which later became known as Pac-Man and the Ghostly Adventures. 41E collaborated with Avi Arad, Rick Ungar, Tom Ruegger, and Paul Rugg for the project. In May 2012, 41E entered into partnerships with Striker Entertainment and The CDM Company to begin a licensing program for Pac-Man and the Ghostly Adventures. Throughout 2012 and into 2013, 41E expanded their licensing program and partnered with licensees and agents worldwide for the Pac-Man and the Ghostly Adventures series. In June 2013, Bandai Namco Games commissioned the production of an additional 13 episodes for Season II. With the additional seasons, many worldwide broadcasters acquired the show. In January 2014, another 13 episodes were commissioned bringing Pac-Man and the Ghostly Adventures to 52 episodes in total. In July 2014, 41E entered into a licensing and merchandising agreement with BNGI on their Pac-Man property. 41E licensed classic Pac-Man worldwide, excluding Japan, to multiple manufacturers.

In October 2014, Netflix announced that it entered into an agreement with 41E and Arad Animation for a new original series called Kong: King of the Apes. In 2015, 41E entered into an agreement with Edgar Rice Burroughs, Inc. for the creation of the animated series Edgar Rice Burroughs' Tarzan and Jane. 41E acquired the right to develop and distribute the animation worldwide and represent the property globally for licensing and merchandising. In June 2015, 41E announced its partnership with Netflix on Edgar Rice Burroughs' Tarzan and Jane. The animation was produced by Avi Arad and ARC Productions, which was acquired by Jam Filled Entertainment who completed the project. In June 2016, Netflix renewed Kong – King of the Apes for a second season. In October 2016, 41E and Netflix announced another original series, Super Monsters. The animation is produced by Avi Arad.

In September 2017, 41E announced an agreement with Activision Blizzard Studios as the exclusive global sales agent for Linear Television and home entertainment distribution of the animated series Skylanders Academy. In September 2017, 41E announced the production and distribution of a major all new original animated series, to be produced by 41 Studios, entitled Shooting Star. In September 2017, 41E announced the production and distribution of a major all new original animated series to be produced by 41 Studios, entitled The Mini Musketeers. In May 2018, Season 2 of the Netflix original series Kong: King of the Apes launched with consists of ten half-hour episodes. In September 2018, 41E announced a new franchise featuring an action-comedy series for kids, S.M.A.S.H! which was created and executive produced by Allen Bohbot. In October 2018, Season 2 of the Netflix series Super Monsters launched with eight half-hour episodes. In October 2018, Season 2 of the Netflix series Tarzan and Jane launched with five half-hour episodes.

In February 2023, the company revived the Amazin' Adventures brand (previously used by BKN as a syndicated children's block from 1992 to 1997) as a YouTube channel.

== Headquarters ==
The headquarters of 41E is located in Greenwich, Connecticut. 41E also has a satellite office in Spain.

== List of 41E productions ==
- Pac-Man and the Ghostly Adventures (2013–2015)
- Kong: King of the Apes (2016–2018)
- Skylanders Academy (2016–2018)
- Tarzan and Jane (2017–2018)
- Super Monsters (2017–2021)
- Super Monsters: Monster Pets (2019)
- SMASH! (2020)
- Supernatural Academy (2022)
