= KFDM =

Television station in Beaumont, Texas

- Beaumont–Port Arthur–Orange, Texas; United States
- City: Beaumont, Texas
- Channels: Digital: 15 (UHF); Virtual: 6
- Branding: KFDM Channel 6; KFDM 6 News; Southeast Texas CW 10 (6.2); Fox Southeast Texas (6.3)

Programming
- Affiliations: 6.1: CBS; 6.2: CW+; 6.3: Fox

Ownership
- Owner: Sinclair Broadcast Group; (KFDM Licensee, LLC)
- Sister stations: KBTV-TV

History
- First air date: April 24, 1955
- Former call signs: KFDM-TV (1955–2009)
- Former channel numbers: Analog: 6 (VHF, 1955–2009); Digital: 21 (UHF, until 2011), 25 (UHF, 2011–2018)
- Former affiliations: All secondary: ABC (1955-1961); NBC (1955-1957); UPN (2003–2006)
- Call sign meaning: K("C")all for Dependable Magnolene (the motor oil line of founding owner Magnolia Petroleum Company)

Technical information
- Licensing authority: FCC
- Facility ID: 22589
- ERP: 560 kW
- HAAT: 275 m (902 ft)
- Transmitter coordinates: 30°8′25″N 93°58′45″W

Links
- Public license information: Public file; LMS
- Website: kfdm.com; fox4beaumont.com

KFDM (channel 6) is a television station in Beaumont, Texas, United States, affiliated with CBS, The CW Plus, and Fox. It is owned by Sinclair Broadcast Group alongside Port Arthur–licensed KBTV-TV (channel 4). The two stations share studios on Walden Road in southwest Beaumont; KFDM's transmitter is located in Vidor, Texas.

KFDM also previously served the Lake Charles, Louisiana, market as its default CBS station until KSWL-LD signed-on February 15, 2017.

== History ==
KFDM-TV commenced broadcasting on April 24, 1955, and is the oldest on-air TV station in the Beaumont–Port Arthur market. UHF TV channel 31 preceded KFDM by about a year, but went off the air less than a year after its sign on. For years, channel 6 billed itself as "the first television station on the right side of Texas". It was locally owned by Beaumont Broadcasting alongside KFDM (560 AM). The radio station was founded by the Magnolia Petroleum Company; the calls stood for "K(C)all for Dependable Magnolene", the brand name for Magnolia's motor oil line. Although KFDM radio was an affiliate of ABC Radio, channel 6 has always been a primary CBS affiliate, but also carried ABC and NBC programs in its early years. In 1957, NBC programming moved to KPAC-TV (channel 4) upon its opening broadcast. Channel 6 would become an exclusive CBS affiliate when ABC programming moved to the re-opened KBMT-TV on channel 12 in 1961.

Original chief engineer Harold Bartlett, ham call sign W5KWA, oversaw all technical aspects of the station from its construction until his retirement in July 1980. His assistant, Richard Kihn, took over after Bartlett's retirement as acting chief engineer, and was appointed chief engineer on August 4, 1980. Kihn retired on October 26, 2012, and was replaced by Jim Hobbs. Hobbs did not last long and returned to radio engineering in Nebraska. Don Dobbs, former director of engineering at KTVT and KXAS-TV in Dallas–Fort Worth, took over as director of engineering at KFDM to oversee a major rebuild of the studios.

Beaumont Broadcasting sold KFDM radio in 1964 to John Hicks, father of Tom Hicks and brothers Steve and Jay. The radio station's call sign was changed to KLVI; however, channel 6 retained the "-TV" suffix until 2009, long after the two former sister stations went their separate ways. Beaumont Broadcasting held onto KFDM-TV until 1969, when it sold the station to A. H. Belo Corporation, earning a handsome return on its 1939 purchase of KFDM radio.

In 1983, Belo merged with Corinthian Broadcasting, owner of Houston's KHOU-TV. This raised concern with the Federal Communications Commission (FCC) on two fronts. KFDM-TV provided at least Grade B coverage to much of the Houston market's eastern portion, and city-grade coverage in some locations. At the time, the FCC normally did not allow common ownership of two stations with overlapping signals, and would not even consider a waiver for a city-grade overlap. The merger also put Belo over the FCC's limit of five VHF stations per owner. As a result, Belo sold KFDM-TV, along with WTVC in Chattanooga, Tennessee, to Freedom Communications in 1984.

In 1998, KFDM launched a charter The WB 100+ Station Group cable channel identified as "KWBB" to mimic a regular station's call sign. KFDM set up a separate sales department for KWBB.

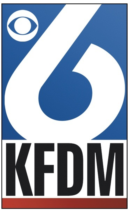
The former KFDM logo, used from 2002 until August 2015.

From 2003 to 2006, the station carried programming from UPN as a secondary affiliation. In 2008, KFDM agreed to provide Southland Conference Television Network programming on Time Warner Cable Channel 35 starting on September 13. At the beginning of 2007, KFDM started broadcasting The CW on its second subchannel.

KFDM shut down its analog signal, over VHF channel 6, on June 12, 2009, the official date on which full-power television stations in the United States transitioned from analog to digital broadcasts under federal mandate. The station's digital signal remained on its pre-transition UHF channel 21. With the mandated shut down of the station's analog signal, the channel lost its ability for its audio to be transmit on radio channel 87.7. On April 7, 2010, the FCC issued a Report & Order, granting KFDM's channel change from channel 21 to channel 25. This was done because viewers in the eastern sections of the viewing area had difficulty receiving their signal on channel 21, due to the antenna issue and the fact that channel 20 was occupied by KLTL, the Louisiana Public Broadcasting (LPB) station in Lake Charles. On April 11, 2011, KFDM completed its move to channel 25 with higher power and a new omnidirectional antenna. Later tests showed the coverage was close to what KFDM had on analog channel 6, though forested areas had a weaker signal and poorer coverage.

Freedom Communications announced on November 2, 2011, that it would bow out of television and sell its stations, including KFDM, to Sinclair Broadcast Group. The deal made KFDM the fourth Sinclair-owned television property in the state of Texas and the first in Eastern Texas. Sinclair already owned KABB and KMYS in San Antonio and completed its purchase of Austin's KEYE-TV on January 3, 2012. Sinclair began operating KFDM under a time brokerage agreement from December 1, 2011, until the group deal was consummated on April 2, 2012.

On August 22, 2012, Nexstar Broadcasting Group filed with the FCC to sell its Fox affiliate KBTV-TV to Deerfield Media, a company also involved in Sinclair's acquisition of stations from Newport Television. Following the acquisition, KFDM took over operation of the station under a shared services agreement. The sale was completed on December 3.

The station began broadcasting Grit service on its .3 subchannel on December 29, 2014.

The facility housing KFDM and KBTV was expanded in 2016 to accommodate both stations and modernize its facility. However, the stations will likely have to move in the future, as the I-10/US 69 interchange will be expanded onto the footprint where those studios, along with the next-door facilities of iHeartMedia's East Texas cluster, currently sit, and Sinclair is currently in negotiations with TxDOT to sell its land. KFDM temporarily moved in July 2023 to their transmitter site in Vidor. In April 2024, the station relocated to a smaller facility on Walden Road in southwest Beaumont, with actual production of the newscasts to be outsourced to Sinclair's San Antonio duopoly of WOAI-TV/KABB. However, upon opening of the new studios, the outsourcing plan appeared to have been scrapped with production happening at the Walden Road facilities.

=== Fox 4 ===
On December 23, 2020, KFDM announced that KBTV-TV's Fox affiliation would move to KFDM's third subchannel on February 1, 2021.

== News operation ==
The 1970s KFDM weekday news team consisted of Beaulieu, Burandt, weatherman Gary Powers, and sportscaster Cy Hurst. KFDM received an award from the Texas chapter of the Associated Press for their coverage of Hurricane Rita in 2005. KFDM also won a regional Emmy in 2006 for the same coverage.

Greg Bostwick has been with the station over 40 years and approximately twenty as chief meteorologist. He rode out Hurricane Rita in downtown Beaumont with weeknight anchor Bill Leger and morning anchor Dan Gresham who has been with the station for over 35 years.

Former KFDM manager Larry Beaulieu joined the station in 1974 when he was hired as news director. He teamed for over 15 years with Cecile Burandt, who was the first female anchor hired in the Beaumont area. Beaulieu retired on September 29, 2011, and was replaced the following December by longtime station employee Rix Garey.

In April 2011, KFDM became the second station in Southeast Texas after KBMT to broadcast its local newscasts in high definition.

=== Notable former on-air staff ===
- Sandra Bookman – weekend anchor
- Leeza Gibbons – co-host of PM Magazine

== Subchannels ==
The station's signal is multiplexed:

Subchannels of KFDM
Subchannel	Res.	Short name	Programming
6.1	1080i	CBS	CBS
6.2	720p	CW Plus	The CW Plus
6.3	720p	FOX	Fox
