= KQEG-CD =

Television station in La Crescent, Minnesota

Translator of WKBT-DT, La Crosse–Eau Claire, Wisconsin

- La Crescent, Minnesota; La Crosse, Wisconsin; United States
- City: La Crescent, Minnesota
- Channels: Digital: 23 (UHF); Virtual: 8
- Branding: see WKBT-DT infobox

Programming
- Affiliations: 8.1: CBS; 8.2: MyNetworkTV; for others, see § Subchannels

Ownership
- Owner: Morgan Murphy Media; (QueenB Television, LLC)

History
- Founded: July 15, 1992
- First air date: July 18, 1994
- Former call signs: K50DK (1992–1996); KQEG-LP (1996–2001); KQEG-CA (2001–2015)
- Former channel numbers: Analog: 50 (UHF, 1994–2001), 23 (UHF, 2001−2015); Virtual: 23 (until 2021)
- Former affiliations: UPN (1995–2006); Independent (1994–1995, 2006–2021); FamilyNet (secondary, until 2013); Ion Television (secondary, 2009–2015); AMGTV (secondary, 2013–2021)
- Call sign meaning: White Eagle Partnership (former owner)

Technical information
- Licensing authority: FCC
- Facility ID: 72207
- Class: CD
- ERP: 15 kW
- HAAT: 225 m (738 ft)
- Transmitter coordinates: 43°44′53″N 91°17′51″W
- Translator(s): WPDR-LD 35 (UHF) Tomah; W18FK-D 18 (UHF) Elk Mound

Links
- Public license information: Public file; LMS
- Website: www.news8000.com

KQEG-CD (channel 23) is a low-power, Class A television station licensed to La Crescent, Minnesota, United States. It is a translator of La Crosse, Wisconsin–licensed CBS affiliate WKBT-DT (channel 8) which is owned by Morgan Murphy Media. KQEG-CD's transmitter is located near Hokah, Minnesota; its parent station maintains studios on South 6th Street in downtown La Crosse.

KQEG-CD has two translators of its own: WPDR-LD (channel 35, formerly WEZY-LP), located in Tomah, Wisconsin; and W18FK-D (channel 18, formerly WBDL-LD and WBOO-LP), licensed to Elk Mound, Wisconsin. W18FK-D, then WBDL-LD, was previously silent due to the station's former frequency (UHF 45) placement in the 600 MHz band that was cleared during the 2016 FCC spectrum auction. Also, equipment delays resulting from the COVID-19 outbreak contributed to the outlet remaining off air.

== History ==
=== Early years ===
KQEG was started by White Eagle Partnership (Eleanor St. John, Perry St. John, and Richard Wilson) in 1994 as K50DK (channel 50). The original construction permit was dated July 15, 1992.

The call letters K50DK were changed to KQEG-LP on February 5, 1996. The channel was changed from 50 to 23 in February 2001. The station's license changed from low power to Class A, thus changing the callsign to KQEG-CA on August 28, 2001.

In June 2002, White Eagle Partnership purchased the construction permit for W45CF (channel 45) of Chippewa Falls, Wisconsin, from Inspiration Television. (The construction permit had been granted to Inspiration Television in October 2001.) W45CF would operate as a translator station of KQEG-CA.

In September 2004, the community of license for W45CF was changed from Chippewa Falls to Elk Mound, Wisconsin.

=== FamilyNet era ===
For some years, KQEG's primary network affiliation had been with UPN, and the station maintained a secondary affiliation with FamilyNet. Following the January 24, 2006, announcement that UPN and The WB would merge into a new network called The CW to launch fall 2006, KQEG gained a bit of national notoriety when it was apparently the first station to its affiliation due to the merger on January 27, 2006. CBS affiliate WKBT-TV would swiftly launch UPN La Crosse/Eau Claire on their second subchannel on January 30, 2006, later affiliating with MyNetworkTV upon UPN's demise.

On January 30, 2006, KQEG began airing a rebroadcast of WXOW's 6 p.m. newscast at 7 p.m. weekday evenings.

KQEG-CA and W45CF were purchased by Magnum Radio Inc. (David R. Magnum et al.) from White Eagle Partnership (Eleanor St. John) on January 19, 2009. Magnum Radio Inc. already owned WIBU-LP channel 51 of Tomah, Wisconsin.

In May 2009, KQEG's programming was revamped as the station began a part-time affiliation with Ion Television; this included the discontinuation of the 7 p.m. airing of WXOW's 6 p.m. newscast. Also, WIBU-LP began broadcasting as a translator station of KQEG-CA.

On September 16, 2010, the call letters for W45CF were changed to WROE-LP; WMBZ-LP on July 18, 2014; WBWI-LP on February 18, 2015; WMKQ-LP on June 12, 2015; WZRK-LP on February 22, 2017; and then to WBOO-LP on July 3, 2017.

Station logo used until 2021.

=== Since 2013 ===
In 2013, KQEG dropped its part-time affiliation with FamilyNet; it would maintain a part-time affiliation with AMGTV.

On January 13, 2015, WIBU-LP changed its call letters to WEZY-LP; the WEZY call letters were previously used by WVTY in Racine, a radio station also owned by Magnum.

By fall of 2015, KQEG dropped its part-time affiliation with Ion; its part-time affiliation with AMGTV continued.

In 2021, Magnum filed to sell the stations to Morgan Murphy Media, allowing WKBT to address its signal issues with its physical VHF channel 8 within La Crosse by repeating the station on UHF within the city. Magnum retained the WBOO call letters by swapping them with its radio station in Reedsburg, which became WBOO; WBOO-LP became WBDL-LP. The sale was completed on November 30, 2021. Its now-duplicative channel position was dropped by Charter Spectrum across the La Crosse–Eau Claire and Rochester service territories soon after.

On November 18, 2021, WEZY-LP was licensed for digital operations as WPDR-LD.

== Former programming ==
KQEG featured much of the main programming schedule (non paid-programming) of AMGTV. Times when AMG programming was seen generally included weekdays from 1 to 6 a.m. and from 10 to 11:30 a.m., Saturdays from 1 to 10 a.m., and Sundays from 1 to 8 a.m. The above network programming blocks were regularly preempted with syndicated home shopping or KQEG original programs.

Original local programming produced by KQEG included local high school sports, Knights of Thunder (La Crosse Fairgrounds Speedway coverage), Seven Rivers Sports, Seven Rivers Racing, Seven Rivers Health, Seven Rivers Spotlight, selected parades, Little Britches Rodeo, La Crosse County government meetings, and in conjunction with UW-La Crosse, the annual Coulee Region Humane Society Telethon.

== Technical information ==
=== Subchannels ===
This station rebroadcasts the subchannels of WKBT-DT:

Subchannels of WKBT-DT
Channel	Res.	Short name	Programming
8.1	1080i	WKBT-HD	CBS
8.2	720p	WKBT-DT	Independent with MyNetworkTV
8.3	480i	ION	Ion
8.4	480i	DABL	Dabl
8.5	480i	QVC	QVC
8.6	480i	HSN	HSN

=== Analog-to-digital transition ===
On September 25, 2009, Magnum Radio was granted a construction permit by the FCC for a digital flash cut of KQEG-CA channel 23 (UHF analog) to KQEG-CD channel 23 (UHF digital). The station carried out its digital flash cut over a period of several weeks beginning in May 2015.
