= World Interuniversity Games =

International sports event

The World Interuniversity Games is an international sports event, which was organised by IFIUS (International Federation for Interuniversity Sport) each year in October. It is currently organised by Committee Panathlon Clubs of Universities, after IFIUS was disbanded and integrated inside Panathlon International in 2011.

== IFIUS Games ==
- 1999 : Antwerp (Belgium)
- 2000 : Paris (France)
- 2001 : Amsterdam (the Netherlands)
- 2002 : Barcelona (Spain)
- 2003 : Rome (Italy)
- 2004 : Antwerp (Belgium)
- 2005 : Rotterdam (the Netherlands)
- 2006 : Dublin (Ireland)
- 2007 : Vienna (Austria)
- 2008 : Budapest (Hungary)
- 2009 : Milan (Italy)
- 2010 : Valencia (Spain)
- 2011 : Amsterdam (the Netherlands)
- 2012 : Belgrade (Serbia)
- 2013 : Antwerp (Belgium)

== IFIUS Champions ==
=== 2012 Belgrade ===
- Football Men : Institute of Physical Education and Sport (Tehran, Iran)
- Football Women : Faculty of Sport, University of Belgrade (Belgrade, Serbia)
- Futsal Men : University Ovidius Constanta (Constanta, Romania)
- Basketball Men : Institute of Physical Education and Sport (Tehran, Iran)
- Basketball Women : Institute of Physical Education and Sport (Tehran, Iran)
- Volleyball Men : Antwerp University Association (Antwerp, Belgium)
- Volleyball Women : Faculty of Sport, University of Belgrade (Belgrade, Serbia)

=== 2011 Amsterdam ===
- Football Men : University of Applied Sciences Wiener Neustadt (Wiener Neustadt, Austria)
- Football Women : University Abderrahmane Mira de Bejaia (Algeria) (Béjaïa, Algeria)
- Futsal Men : Islamic Azad University, Karaj Branch (Karaj, Iran)
- Basketball Men : Islamic Azad University, Karaj Branch (Karaj, [Iran)
- Basketball Women : Università Cattolica del Sacro Cuore (Milan, Rome, Italy)
- Volleyball Men : Antwerp University Association (Antwerp, Belgium)
- Volleyball Women : University of Bacău (Bacău, Romania)
- Golf and Pitch & Putt : Mendeleyev University of Chemical Technology (Moscow, Russia)
- Individual golf : Volkov Roman, Mendeleyev University of Chemical Technology (Moscow, Russia)
- Individual pitch & putt : Grajdianu Ilia, Mendeleyev University of Chemical Technology (Moscow, Russia)

=== 2010 Valencia ===
- Football Men : Karlsruhe Institute of Technology (Karlsruhe, Germany)
- Football Women : Università Cattolica del Sacro Cuore (Milan, Rome, Italy)
- Futsal Men : University Ovidius Constanta (Constanta, Romania)
- Basketball Men : Pushkin Leningrad State University (Saint Petersburg, Russia)
- Basketball Women : Moscow Agricultural Academy named after K.A. Timiryazev (Moscow, Russia)
- Volleyball Men : Antwerp University Association (Antwerp, Belgium)
- Volleyball Women : University of Bacău (Bacău, Romania)
- Golf and Pitch & Putt : Universidad CEU Cardenal Herrera (Valencia, Spain)

=== 2009 Milan ===
- Football Men : University of Nancy (Nancy, France)
- Football Women : Università Cattolica del Sacro Cuore (Milan, Rome, Italy)
- Futsal Men : University Ovidius Constanta (Constanta, Romania)
- Basketball Men : University of Belgrade (Belgrade, Serbia)
- Basketball Women : Università Cattolica del Sacro Cuore (Milan, Rome, Italy)
- Volleyball Men : Islamic Azad University, Karaj Branch (Karaj, Iran)
- Volleyball Women : University of Bacău (Bacău, Romania)
- Golf and Pitch & Putt : Universidad CEU Cardenal Herrera (Valencia, Spain)

=== 2008 Budapest ===
- Football Men : University of Nancy (Nancy, France)
- Football Women : Catholic University Santa Maria La Antigua (Panama City, Panama)
- Futsal Men : Islamic Azad University, Karaj Branch (Karaj, Iran)
- Basketball Men : Pushkin Leningrad State University (Saint Petersburg, Russia)
- Basketball Women : Budapest University (Budapest, Hungary)
- Volleyball Men : Islamic Azad University, Karaj Branch (Karaj, Iran)
- Volleyball Women : University of Bacău (Bacău, Romania)

=== 2007 Vienna ===
- Football Men : Islamic Azad University (Tehran, Iran)
- Football Women : The Hague University (The Hague, Netherlands)
- Futsal Men : Mirny Polytechnic Institute (Mirny, Russia)
- Basketball Men : Pushkin Leningrad State University (Saint Petersburg, Russia)
- Volleyball Men : Islamic Azad University (Tehran, Iran)
- Volleyball Women : University of Bacău (Bacău, Romania)

=== 2006 Dublin ===
- Football Men : MESI (Moscow, Russia)
- Football Women : The Hague University (The Hague, Netherlands)
- Futsal Men : Mendeleyev University of Chemical Technology (Moscow, Russia)
- Basketball Men : Pushkin Leningrad State University (Saint Petersburg, Russia)
- Volleyball Men : Islamic Azad University (Tehran, Iran)
- Volleyball Women : University of Sannio (Benevento, Italy)

=== 2005 Rotterdam ===
- Football Men : University of Karlsruhe (Karlsruhe, Germany)
- Football Women : Technical University of Munich (Munich, Germany)
- Futsal Men : Ukhta State Technical University (Ukhta, Russia)
- Basketball Men : Pushkin Leningrad State University (Saint Petersburg, Russia)

=== 2004 Antwerp ===
- Football Men : University of Erlangen-Nürnberg (Erlangen/Nuremberg, Germany)
- Football Women : University of Erlangen-Nürnberg (Erlangen/Nuremberg, Germany)
- Futsal Men : North-West Academy of Public Administration (Saint Petersburg, Russia)

=== 2003 Rome ===
- Football Men : University of Erlangen-Nürnberg (Erlangen/Nuremberg, Germany)
- Football Women : Catholic University of Leuven (Leuven, Belgium)
- Futsal Men : University of Sevilla (Sevilla, Spain)

=== 2002 Barcelona ===
- Football Men : University of Erlangen-Nürnberg (Erlangen/Nuremberg, Germany)
- Football Women : University of Barcelona (Barcelona, Spain)

=== 2001 Amsterdam ===
- Football Men : The Hague University (The Hague, Netherlands)
- Football Women : University of the Basque Country (Bilbao/San Sebastián, Vitoria-Gasteiz Spain)

=== 2000 Paris ===
- Football Men : University La Laguna Tenerife (San Cristóbal de La Laguna, Spain)
- Football Women : University of the Basque Country (Bilbao/San Sebastián/Vitoria-Gasteiz, Spain)

=== 1999 Antwerp ===
- Football Men : Trondheim NTNU University (Trondheim, Norway)

== Medals table ==
Includes at this time medals won starting 2005. Updated until 2008 Games.

World Interuniversity Games medal count
Pos	University	Location	Gold	Silver	Bronze
1	(Russia) Pushkin Leningrad State University	Saint Petersburg, Russia	4	0	0
2	(Iran) Islamic Azad University	Tehran, Iran	3	1	1
3	(Romania) University of Bacău	Bacău, Romania	3	0	0
4	(Iran) Islamic Azad University, Karaj Branch	Karaj, Iran	3	0	0
5	(Italy) Catholic University of the Sacred Heart	Milan, Rome, Italy	2	1	2
6	(Netherlands) The Hague University	The Hague, Netherlands	2	0	1
7	(Germany) University of Karlsruhe	Karlsruhe, Germany	1	2	1
8	(Russia) MESI	Moscow, Russia	1	2	0
9	(Hungary) Budapest University of Technology and Economics	Budapest, Hungary	1	1	2
10	(Serbia) Faculty of Organizational Sciences, Belgrade	Belgrade, Serbia	1	1	0
11	(Germany) Technical University of Munich	Munich, Germany	1	0	1
12	(Italy) University of Sannio	Benevento, Italy	1	0	1
13	(Panama) Catholic University Santa Maria La Antigua	Panama City, Panama	1	0	1
14	(Russia) Mendeleyev University of Chemistry and Technology	Moscow, Russia	1	0	1
15	(Romania) Ovidius University	Constanţa, Romania	1	1	1
16	(Russia) Ukhta State Technical University	Ukhta, Russia	1	0	0
17	(Russia) Mirny Polytechnic Institute	Mirny, Russia	1	0	0
18	(France) Henri Poincaré University	Nancy, France	1	0	0
19	(Russia) North-West Academy of Public Administration	Saint Petersburg, Russia	0	5	3
20	(Russia) Saint Petersburg State University of Service and Economics	Saint Petersburg, Russia	0	2	1
21	(Croatia) University of Osijek	Osijek, Croatia	0	1	1
22	(England) University of Worcester	Worcester, England	0	1	1
23	(Russia) South Russian State University	Shakhty, Russia	0	1	0
24	(Netherlands) Amsterdam University of Applied Sciences	Amsterdam, Netherlands	0	1	0
25	(United States) Moraine Valley Community College	Palos Hills, United States	0	1	0
26	(Norway) University of Oslo	Oslo, Norway	0	1	0
27	(Belgium) University of Antwerp	Antwerp, Belgium	0	1	0
28	(Republic of Ireland) University College Dublin	Dublin, Ireland	0	0	2
29	(Russia) Gubkin Russian State University of Oil and Gas	Moscow, Russia	0	0	1
29	(Romania) ASE Bucharest	Bucharest, Romania	0	0	1
29	(Netherlands) University of Groningen	Groningen, Netherlands	0	0	1
29	(Serbia) University of Belgrade	Belgrade, Serbia	0	0	1
29	(Netherlands) Delft University of Technology	Delft, Netherlands	0	0	1
29	(Croatia) Polytechnic of Karlovac	Karlovac, Croatia	0	0	1
29	(Russia) Ural State University of Railway Transport	Yekaterinburg, Russia	0	0	1
29	(Russia) Saint Petersburg State University	Saint Petersburg, Russia	0	0	1
29	(China) Southwest University of Political Science & Law	Chongqing, China	0	0	1
29	(Russia) Academy of Labour and Social Relations	Moscow, Russia	0	0	1
29	(North Macedonia) State University of Tetovo	Tetovo, Republic of Macedonia	0	0	1
