= 2007 World Interuniversity Games =

International Sport Event

IX World Interuniversity Games
- Opening: October 1, 2007
- Closing: October 5, 2007

The 2007 World Interuniversity Games were the ninth edition of the Games (organised by IFIUS), and were held in Vienna, Austria, from October 1 to October 5, 2007.

== Hosting ==
Vienna was selected as host city for the Games. The host university was Vienna University of Technology (TU Wien).

== Competitions ==
Teams participated in 6 different competitions (4 sports), the same as in Dublin 2006.

- Football Men
- Football Women
- Futsal Men
- Basketball Men
- Volleyball Men
- Volleyball Women

== Final standings ==
Football Men

1st place, gold medalist(s)	(Iran) Islamic Azad University	Tehran, Iran
2nd place, silver medalist(s)	(Croatia) Faculty of Law, Osijek	Osijek, Croatia
3rd place, bronze medalist(s)	(Germany) University of Karlsruhe	Karlsruhe, Germany

Football Women

1st place, gold medalist(s)	(Netherlands) The Hague University	The Hague, the Netherlands
2nd place, silver medalist(s)	(Norway) University of Oslo	Oslo, Norway
3rd place, bronze medalist(s)	(Panama) Catholic University Santa Maria La Antigua	Panama City, Panama

Futsal Men

1st place, gold medalist(s)	(Russia) Mirny Polytechnic Institute	Mirny, Russia
2nd place, silver medalist(s)	(Romania) University Ovidius Constanta	Constanţa, Romania
3rd place, bronze medalist(s)	(Russia) North-West Academy of Public Administration	Saint Petersburg, Russia

Basketball Men

1st place, gold medalist(s)	(Russia) Leningrad State University named after Pushkin	Saint Petersburg, Russia
2nd place, silver medalist(s)	(Iran) Islamic Azad University	Tehran, Iran
3rd place, bronze medalist(s)	(Italy) University of Sannio (England) University of Worcester	Benevento, Italy Worcester, England

Volleyball Men

1st place, gold medalist(s)	(Iran) Islamic Azad University	Tehran, Iran
2nd place, silver medalist(s)	(Russia) North-West Academy of Public Administration	Saint Petersburg, Russia
3rd place, bronze medalist(s)	(China) Southwest University of Political Science & Law	Chongqing, China

Volleyball Women

1st place, gold medalist(s)	(Romania) University of Bacău	Bacău, Romania
2nd place, silver medalist(s)	(Russia) St Petersburg State University of Service and Economics	Saint Petersburg, Russia
3rd place, bronze medalist(s)	(Russia) North-West Academy of Public Administration	Saint Petersburg, Russia
