= 2009 World Interuniversity Games =

XI World Interuniversity Games Milan 2009
- Opening: October 12, 2009
- Closing: October 16, 2009

The 2009 World Interuniversity Games were the 11th edition of the Games (organised by IFIUS, and took place in Milan, Italy, from October 12 to October 16, 2009.

== Hosting ==
After 5 years, the Games were once again held in Italy. After Rome 2003, Milan in the Lombardy region hosted the 2009 Games. The Università Cattolica del Sacro Cuore acted as the host university.

== Competitions ==
Teams participated in 8 different competitions (5 sports). For the first time a Golf and Pitch&Putt competition was held.

- Football Men
- Football Women
- Futsal Men
- Basketball Men
- Basketball Women
- Volleyball Men
- Volleyball Women
- Golf and Pitch&Putt

=== Football Men ===
Results of the Final Round:

Quarter-finals
October 15, 2009
(France) University of Nancy	7
(United States) Moraine Valley Community College	2
October 15, 2009
(Russia) MESI	1
(Belgium) HOWEST University College West-Flanders	0
October 15, 2009
(Iran) Islamic Azad University, Karaj Branch	3
(Belgium) Lessius University College	2
October 15, 2009
(Russia) Gubkin Russian State University of Oil and Gas	1
(Austria) Vienna University of Technology	3

Semi-finals
October 16, 2009
(France) University of Nancy	6
(Russia) MESI	0
October 16, 2009
(Iran) Islamic Azad University, Karaj Branch	3
(Austria) Vienna University of Technology	2

Final
October 16, 2009
(France) University of Nancy	1
(Iran) Islamic Azad University, Karaj Branch	0
Third place
October 16, 2009
(Russia) MESI	1
(Austria) Vienna University of Technology (pen.)	1

=== Football Women ===
Results of the Final Round:

Semi-finals
October 16, 2009
(Iran) Islamic Azad University	2
(Spain) University of La Laguna (after extra time)	3
October 16, 2009
(Italy) Università Cattolica del Sacro Cuore (pen.	2 (5)
(Belgium) Lessius University College	2 (4)

Final
October 16, 2009
(Spain) University of La Laguna	0
(Italy) Università Cattolica del Sacro Cuore (after extra time)	1
Third place
October 16, 2009
(Iran) Islamic Azad University	3
(Belgium) Lessius University College	0

== Final standings ==
Football Men

1st place, gold medalist(s)	(France) University of Nancy	Nancy, France
2nd place, silver medalist(s)	(Iran) Islamic Azad University, Karaj Branch	Karaj, Iran
3rd place, bronze medalist(s)	(Austria) Vienna University of Technology	Vienna, Austria

Football Women

1st place, gold medalist(s)	(Italy) Università Cattolica del Sacro Cuore	Milan, Italy
2nd place, silver medalist(s)	(Spain) University of La Laguna	La Laguna, Spain
3rd place, bronze medalist(s)	(Iran) Islamic Azad University	Tehran, Iran

Futsal Men

1st place, gold medalist(s)	(Romania) University Ovidius Constanta	Constanta, Romania
2nd place, silver medalist(s)	(Iran) Islamic Azad University, Karaj Branch	Karaj, Iran
3rd place, bronze medalist(s)	(Slovakia) Technical University of Kosice	Košice, Slovakia

Basketball Men

1st place, gold medalist(s)	(Serbia) University of Belgrade	Belgrade, Serbia
2nd place, silver medalist(s)	(Russia) Leningrad State University n.a. Pushkin	Saint Petersburg, Russia
3rd place, bronze medalist(s)	(Italy) Università Cattolica del Sacro Cuore	Milan, Italy

Basketball Women

1st place, gold medalist(s)	(Italy) Università Cattolica del Sacro Cuore	Milan, Italy
2nd place, silver medalist(s)	(Iran) Islamic Azad University	Tehran, Iran
3rd place, bronze medalist(s)	(Lebanon) Saint Joseph University	Beirut, Lebanon

Volleyball Men

1st place, gold medalist(s)	(Iran) Islamic Azad University, Karaj Branch	Karaj, Iran
2nd place, silver medalist(s)	(Iran) Khomeini Shahr University	Khomeynishahr, Iran
3rd place, bronze medalist(s)	(Italy) CUS Università degli Studi di Milano	Milan, Italy

Volleyball Women

1st place, gold medalist(s)	(Romania) University of Bacău	Bacău, Romania
2nd place, silver medalist(s)	(Russia) St Petersburg State University of Service and Economics	Saint Petersburg, Russia
3rd place, bronze medalist(s)	(Belgium) Antwerp Association	Antwerp, Belgium

Golf and Pitch & Putt

1st place, gold medalist(s)	(Spain) Universidad CEU Cardenal Herrera Valencia	Valencia, Spain
2nd place, silver medalist(s)	(Russia) D. Mendeleyev University of Chemical Technology	Moscow, Russia
3rd place, bronze medalist(s)	(Iran) Islamic Azad University, Karaj Branch	Karaj, Iran
