= 2008 World Interuniversity Games =

X World Interuniversity Games Budapest 2008
- Opening: October 6, 2008
- Closing: October 10, 2008

The 2008 World Interuniversity Games were the tenth edition of the Games (organised by IFIUS, and were held in Budapest, Hungary, from October 6 to October 10, 2008.

== Hosting ==
With Budapest as host city, 2008 marked the first time the Games took place outside Western Europe. The host of 2008 was the Budapest University of Technology and Economics (BME).

== Competitions ==
Teams participated in seven competitions (four sports). For the first time the Basketball Women competition was held.

- Football Men
- Football Women
- Futsal Men
- Basketball Men
- Basketball Women
- Volleyball Men
- Volleyball Women

=== Football Men ===
Results of the Final Round:

Quarter-finals
October 9, 2008
(France) University of Nancy (pen.)	1 (5)
(Austria) Vienna University of Technology	1 (4)
October 9, 2008
(Belgium) Lessius University College	1
(Russia) MESI	3
October 9, 2008
(Germany) University of Karlsruhe	0 (3)
(Russia) Academy of Labour and Social Relations (pen.)	0 (4)
October 9, 2008
(Austria) University of Applied Sciences Wiener Neustadt	0 (4)
(Russia) Gubkin Russian State University of Oil and Gas (pen.)	0 (5)

Semi-finals
October 10, 2008
(France) University of Nancy	5
(Russia) Academy of Labour and Social Relations	0
October 10, 2008
(Russia) MESI	3
(Russia) Gubkin Russian State University of Oil and Gas	1

Final
October 10, 2008
(France) University of Nancy	2
(Russia) MESI	0
Third place
October 10, 2008
(Russia) Academy of Labour and Social Relations	4
(Russia) Gubkin Russian State University of Oil and Gas	0

=== Football Women ===
Results of the Final Round:

Semi-finals
October 10, 2008
(Panama) Catholic University Santa Maria La Antigua	6
(Belgium) Lessius University College	0
October 10, 2008
(Belgium) University of Antwerp	3
(Hungary) Budapest University of Technology and Economics	2

Final
October 10, 2008
(Panama) Catholic University Santa Maria La Antigua	1
(Belgium) University of Antwerp	0
Third place
October 10, 2008
(Belgium) Lessius University College	0
(Hungary) Budapest University of Technology and Economics	3

=== Futsal Men ===
Results of the Final Round:

Quarter-finals
October 9, 2008
(Serbia) Faculty of Organizational Sciences, Belgrade	6
(Russia) Sakhalin State University	3
October 9, 2008
(Russia) D. Mendeleyev University of Chemical Technology	7
(Hungary) Semmelweis University	2
October 9, 2008
(Romania) University Ovidius Constanta	10
(Serbia) Faculty of Economics, Belgrade	2
October 9, 2008
(Iran) Islamic Azad University, Karaj Branch	4
(Russia) North-West Academy of Public Administration	2

Semi-finals
October 10, 2008
(Serbia) Faculty of Organizational Sciences, Belgrade	3
(Russia) D. Mendeleyev University of Chemical Technology	1
October 10, 2008
(Romania) University Ovidius Constanta	7
(Iran) Islamic Azad University, Karaj Branch	9

Final
October 10, 2008
(Serbia) Faculty of Organizational Sciences, Belgrade	1
(Iran) Islamic Azad University, Karaj Branch	3
Third place
October 10, 2008
(Russia) D. Mendeleyev University of Chemical Technology	8
(Romania) University Ovidius Constanta	6

== Final standings ==
Football Men

1st place, gold medalist(s)	(France) University of Nancy	Nancy, France
2nd place, silver medalist(s)	(Russia) MESI	Moscow, Russia
3rd place, bronze medalist(s)	(Russia) Academy of Labour and Social Relations	Moscow, Russia

Football Women

1st place, gold medalist(s)	(Panama) Catholic University Santa Maria La Antigua	Panama City, Panama
2nd place, silver medalist(s)	(Belgium) University of Antwerp	Antwerp, Belgium
3rd place, bronze medalist(s)	(Hungary) Budapest University of Technology and Economics	Budapest, Hungary

Futsal Men

1st place, gold medalist(s)	(Iran) Islamic Azad University, Karaj Branch	Karaj, Iran
2nd place, silver medalist(s)	(Serbia) Faculty of Organizational Sciences, Belgrade	Belgrade, Serbia
3rd place, bronze medalist(s)	(Russia) D. Mendeleyev University of Chemical Technology	Moscow, Russia

Basketball Men

1st place, gold medalist(s)	(Russia) Leningrad State University named after Pushkin	Saint Petersburg, Russia
2nd place, silver medalist(s)	(Hungary) Budapest University of Technology and Economics	Budapest, Hungary
3rd place, bronze medalist(s)	(Italy) Catholic University of the Sacred Heart	Milan, Italy

Basketball Women

1st place, gold medalist(s)	(Hungary) Budapest University	Budapest, Hungary
2nd place, silver medalist(s)	(Italy) Catholic University of the Sacred Heart	Milan, Italy
3rd place, bronze medalist(s)	(Hungary) Budapest University of Technology and Economics	Budapest, Hungary

Volleyball Men

1st place, gold medalist(s)	(Iran) Islamic Azad University, Karaj Branch	Karaj, Iran
2nd place, silver medalist(s)	(Russia) North-West Academy of Public Administration	Saint Petersburg, Russia
3rd place, bronze medalist(s)	(North Macedonia) State University of Tetovo	Tetovo, Republic of Macedonia

Volleyball Women

1st place, gold medalist(s)	(Romania) University of Bacău	Bacău, Romania
2nd place, silver medalist(s)	(Russia) North-West Academy of Public Administration	Saint Petersburg, Russia
3rd place, bronze medalist(s)	(Russia) St Petersburg State University of Service and Economics	Saint Petersburg, Russia
