= 2005 World Interuniversity Games =

2005 multi-sport event

VII World Interuniversity Games Rotterdam 2005
- Opening: October 10, 2005
- Closing: October 14, 2005

The 2005 World Interuniversity Games were the seventh edition of the Games (organised by IFIUS), and were held in Rotterdam, the Netherlands, from October 10 to October 14, 2005.

== Hosting ==
Rotterdam, the Netherlands, was selected as host city for the Games. The host university was INHOLLAND University College. Erasmus University and Hogeschool Rotterdam acted as a co-hosts.

== Competitions ==
Teams participated in four different competitions (three sports), this included the new addition of the Basketball Men competition.

- Football Men
- Football Women
- Futsal Men
- Basketball Men

== Final standings ==
Football Men

1st place, gold medalist(s)	(Germany) University of Karlsruhe	Karlsruhe, Germany
2nd place, silver medalist(s)	(Russia) Moscow State ESI University	Moscow, Russia
3rd place, bronze medalist(s)	(Russia) Gubkin State University Moscow (Romania) ASE Bucharest	Moscow, Russia Bucharest, Romania

Football Women

1st place, gold medalist(s)	(Germany) Technical University of Munich	Munich, Germany
2nd place, silver medalist(s)	(Germany) University of Karlsruhe	Karlsruhe, Germany
3rd place, bronze medalist(s)	(Netherlands) The Hague University (Netherlands) University of Groningen	The Hague, the Netherlands Groningen, the Netherlands

Futsal Men

1st place, gold medalist(s)	(Russia) Ukhta Technical State University	Ukhta, Russia
2nd place, silver medalist(s)	(Russia) North-West Academy, St Petersburg	Saint Petersburg, Russia
3rd place, bronze medalist(s)	(Serbia) University of Economics, Belgrade (Netherlands) TU Delft	Belgrade, Serbia Delft, the Netherlands

Basketball Men

1st place, gold medalist(s)	(Russia) Leningrad State University	Saint Petersburg, Russia
2nd place, silver medalist(s)	(Russia) North-West Academy, St Petersburg	Saint Petersburg, Russia
3rd place, bronze medalist(s)	(Croatia) Polytechnic of Karlovac (Russia) Urals Railway State University	Karlovac, Croatia Yekaterinburg, Russia
