= 2006 World Interuniversity Games =

VIII World Interuniversity Games Dublin 2006
- Opening: October 9, 2006
- Closing: October 13, 2006

The 2006 World Interuniversity Games were the eighth edition of the Games (organised by IFIUS), and were held in Dublin, Ireland, from October 9 to October 13, 2006.

== Hosting ==
Dublin, Ireland, was selected as host city for the Games. The host university was the University College Dublin (UCD). Dublin City University (DCU) acted as a co-host.

== Competitions ==
Teams participated in 6 different competitions (4 sports), this included the new addition of Volleyball Men & Women competitions.

- Football Men
- Football Women
- Futsal Men
- Basketball Men
- Volleyball Men
- Volleyball Women

== Final standings ==
Football Men

1st place, gold medalist(s)	(Russia) MESI Moscow	Moscow, Russia
2nd place, silver medalist(s)	(Russia) South Russian State University	Shakhty, Russia
3rd place, bronze medalist(s)	(Croatia) Faculty of Law, Osijek	Osijek, Croatia

Football Women

1st place, gold medalist(s)	(Netherlands) The Hague University	The Hague, the Netherlands
2nd place, silver medalist(s)	(Germany) University of Karlsruhe	Karlsruhe, Germany
3rd place, bronze medalist(s)	(Germany) Technical University of Munich	Munich, Germany

Futsal Men

1st place, gold medalist(s)	(Russia) Mendeleyev University of Chemistry Technology	Moscow, Russia
2nd place, silver medalist(s)	(Netherlands) Amsterdam College	Amsterdam, the Netherlands
3rd place, bronze medalist(s)	(Romania) University Ovidius Constanta (Russia) St. Petersburg State University	Constanţa, Romania Saint Petersburg, Russia

Basketball Men

1st place, gold medalist(s)	(Russia) Leningrad State University	Saint Petersburg, Russia
2nd place, silver medalist(s)	(England) University of Worcester	Worcester, England
3rd place, bronze medalist(s)	(Republic of Ireland) University College Dublin (Iran) Islamic Azad University	Dublin, Ireland Tehran, Iran

Volleyball Men

1st place, gold medalist(s)	(Iran) Islamic Azad University	Tehran, Iran
2nd place, silver medalist(s)	(Russia) St Petersburg State University of Service and Economics	Saint Petersburg, Russia
3rd place, bronze medalist(s)	(Russia) North-West Academy of Public Administration	Saint Petersburg, Russia

Volleyball Women

1st place, gold medalist(s)	(Italy) Sannio University	Benevento, Italy
2nd place, silver medalist(s)	(United States) Moraine Valley Community College	Palos Hills, Illinois, USA
3rd place, bronze medalist(s)	(Republic of Ireland) University College Dublin	Dublin, Ireland
