= Artesis Plantijn University College of Antwerp =

University in Antwerp, Belgium

AP University of Applied Sciences and Arts Antwerp
- AP Hogeschool Antwerpen
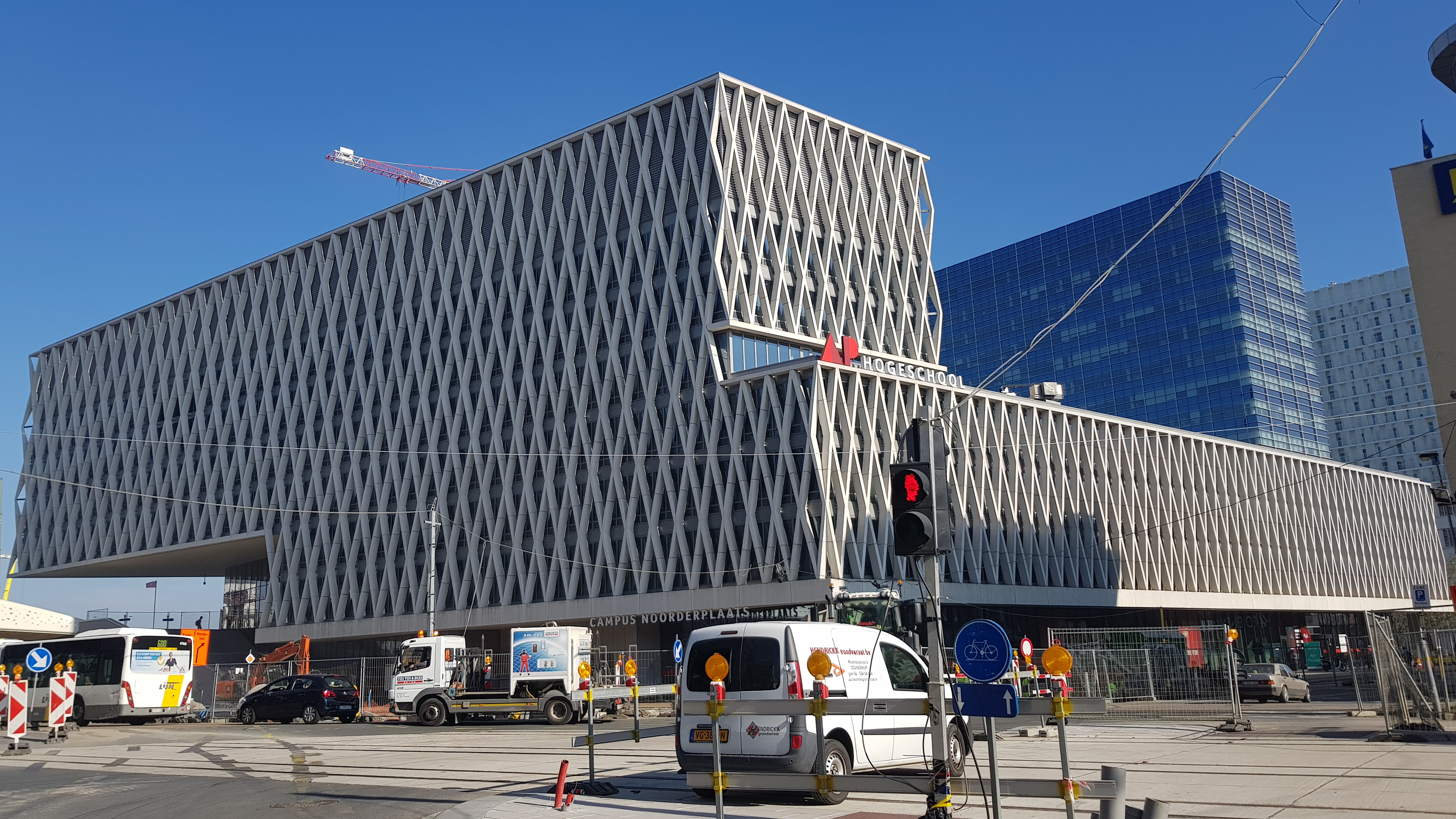
- Antwerpen-AP Hogeschool
- Other name: AP Hogeschool Antwerpen
- Type: Public
- Established: 2012
- Affiliations: Antwerp University Association (AUHA)
- Principal: Pascale De Groote
- Students: 16.000
- Location: (Belgium) Antwerp, Belgium
- Campus: Campus Meistraat Campus Lange Nieuwstraat Campus Spoor Noord – Noorderplaats Campus Kronenburg Campus Spoor Noord – Ellermanstraat Campus deSingel – Desguinlei 25 Campus Mutsaard Campus Keizerstraat Campus Zuid
- Language: Dutch; English
- Website: www.ap.be

AP University of Applied Sciences and Arts Antwerp, founded in 2012, is a non-profit public higher education institution located in the city of Antwerp and created as a merger between Artesis Hogeschool Antwerpen and Plantijn Hogeschool ^{[1] [2]}.

In the 2023–2024 academic year, the University of Applied Sciences and Arts started with 26 bachelor programs, 17 associate programs, 9 master programs and 16.000 students. AP Hogeschool is a member of AUHA, the Antwerp University Association.

== Faculties ==
AP Hogeschool Antwerpen consists of 6 departments and 2 Schools of Arts:

- Department of Health & Life Science
- Department of Media, Design & IT
- Department of Education and Training
- Department of Industry and Environment
- Department of Business & Law
- Department of People & Society
- Royal Conservatoire of Antwerp
- Royal Academy of Fine Arts Antwerp

== Campuses ==
AP University of Applied Sciences and Arts consists of 10 campuses, located in Antwerp, Mechelen, and Turnhout. The head office is located in the Lange Nieuwstraat in Antwerp. From September 2015, the campuses Boom, Mechelen, Paardenmarkt, Merksem and 't Zuid were brought together in Campus Spoor Noord. With an area of 46,500 m², there is room for 7500 students and the student center.

- Campus Spoor Noord – Noorderplaats (health & life science / education and training / people & society )
- Campus Spoor Noord – Ellermanstraat (industry and environment / media, design & IT )
- Campus Spoor Noord – Viaduct (shared campus)
- Campus Spoor Noord – Lichttoren (student center)
- Campus Hallen (NEW: 2024 – industry and environment / health & life science)
- Campus Kronenburg (health & life science)
- Campus Lange Nieuwstraat (head office)
- Campus Meistraat (business & law / media, design & IT)
- Campus Mutsaard (Royal Academy of Fine Arts Antwerp)
- Campus deSingel (Royal Conservatory of Antwerp)
- Campus Dodoens Mechelen (associate programs, education and training )
- Campus Blairon Turnhout (associate programs, education and training )

== Research ==
- AP Hogeschool Antwerpen
- AP Hogeschool Antwerpen | Ranking & Review
- Artesis Plantijn University College Antwerp, University colleges • Higher education institutions database • Study in Flanders

== History ==
=== Artesis Hogeschool Antwerpen ===
Artesis Plantijn University College Antwerp
- Artesis Plantijn Hogeschool Antwerpen
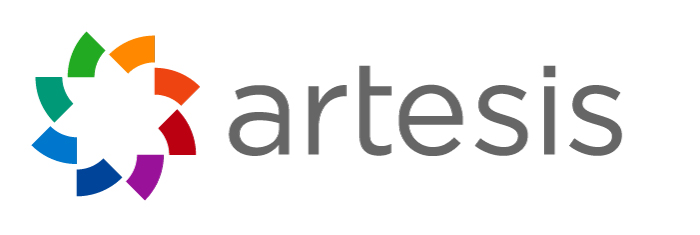
- Type: Public
- Established: ?? (IHAM), ?? (HA)
- Director: Jacques Peeters
- Students: c. 7,100
- Location: (Belgium) Antwerp
- Campus: Campus Paardenmarkt, Campus Blairon, Campus 't Zuid, ...

Artesis Hogeschool Antwerpen (Artesis University College Antwerp)(51°13′18″N 4°24′25″E) was a major college in Flanders, Belgium, with campuses in Antwerp, Mechelen, Lier and Turnhout. In 2013, some departments including design sciences and engineering merged with the University of Antwerp and others, merged with the Plantijn Hogeschool to form the Artesis Plantijn Hogeschool Antwerpen. It comprised numerous departments, ranging from Linguistics and Industrial Engineering to Teacher Training and Applied Computer Science.

==== Former faculties ====
- Architecture - since 2013 incorporated into the University of Antwerp
- Audio-visual and plastic art
- Healthcare
- Business management
- Industrial science and technology
- Music and the performing arts
- Educational instruction and teaching
- Product development
- Social work and commitment
- Applied linguistics

=== Plantijn Hogeschool ===
The Plantijn Hogeschool (Plantijn University College)(51°13′11″N 4°24′43″E) was a university college in Belgium, located in Antwerp, Belgium. The college was part of the Antwerp University Association (AUHA). In 2013 this college was merged with the Artesis Hogeschool Antwerpen.

== Academization and merger in 2013 ==
On 5 July 2012, the Flemish Parliament approved a reform of higher education. The Bologna Declaration of 1999 proposed a reform of European education and introduced bachelor's and master's degrees. Starting with the academic year 2013–2014, Flemish higher education programs were integrated into the universities (academization). Colleges in the city and province of Antwerp were merged and a gender balance was introduced in many boards: [3] [4]

- Academization eliminates the difference between academic programs at universities and academic-level programs at universities of applied sciences. The 22,000 students involved will not be physically relocated, but the universities will be responsible for the education and research policy, the quality assurance, the personnel policy and the issuing of the diplomas. The personnel involved make the transition to the university while retaining rights and obligations. The academic art courses are an exception and remain specific because of their specific character within the colleges of higher education. In order to properly supervise academization, there will be a School of Arts, a separate structure in which the universities also sit.
- In October 2013, new pluralist colleges were created through mergers with greater autonomy for their operation and composition. Artesis and Plantijn were merged in Antwerp. Pascale de Groote became general director of the AP Hogeschool Antwerp, she was department head of the Royal Conservatoire of Antwerp from 2001 to 2013.

== Sources ==
- Artesis Plantijn Hogeschool Antwerpen
