= Paul Verlaine University – Metz =

Former university in Metz, France until 2012

Paul Verlaine University - Metz
- Université Paul Verlaine - Metz (UPV-M)
- Type: Public
- Active: 1970–2012
- Location: Cité Universitaire, 57000 Metz, France, Metz, France; 49°07′11″N 6°10′00″E
- Website: www.univ-lorraine.fr
- Location within France

Paul Verlaine University – Metz (French: Université Paul Verlaine – Metz; UPV-M) was a French university, based in Metz. It merged with Nancy-I, Nancy-II, and the INPL forming the University of Lorraine. The merger process started in 2009 with the creation of a "pôles de recherche et d'enseignement supérieur" or PRES and was completed 1 January 2012.

== Alumni ==
- Nicolas Mathieu - Prix Goncourt winner, 2018

== See also ==
- List of public universities in France by academy
