= Albina A. Goldman =

Albina Abramovna Goldman (Russian: Альбина Абрамовна Гольдман, Suntarsky District, 4 September 1944) is the director of the Mirny Polytechnic Institute of the North-Eastern Federal University. She is a Russian philologist with a post-graduate degree in Philology.

== Awards ==
She is an Honoured Education Worker of the Republic of Sakha (Yakutia), and an Honoured Higher Education Worker of the Russian Federation.

In 2015 she was awarded the status of "Primus Inter Pares" by the Russian Academy of Sciences.
