= Nancy 2 University =

University in Nancy, Lorraine, France (1970–2012)

Coordinates: 48.692846°N 6.168337°E

- Université Nancy 2
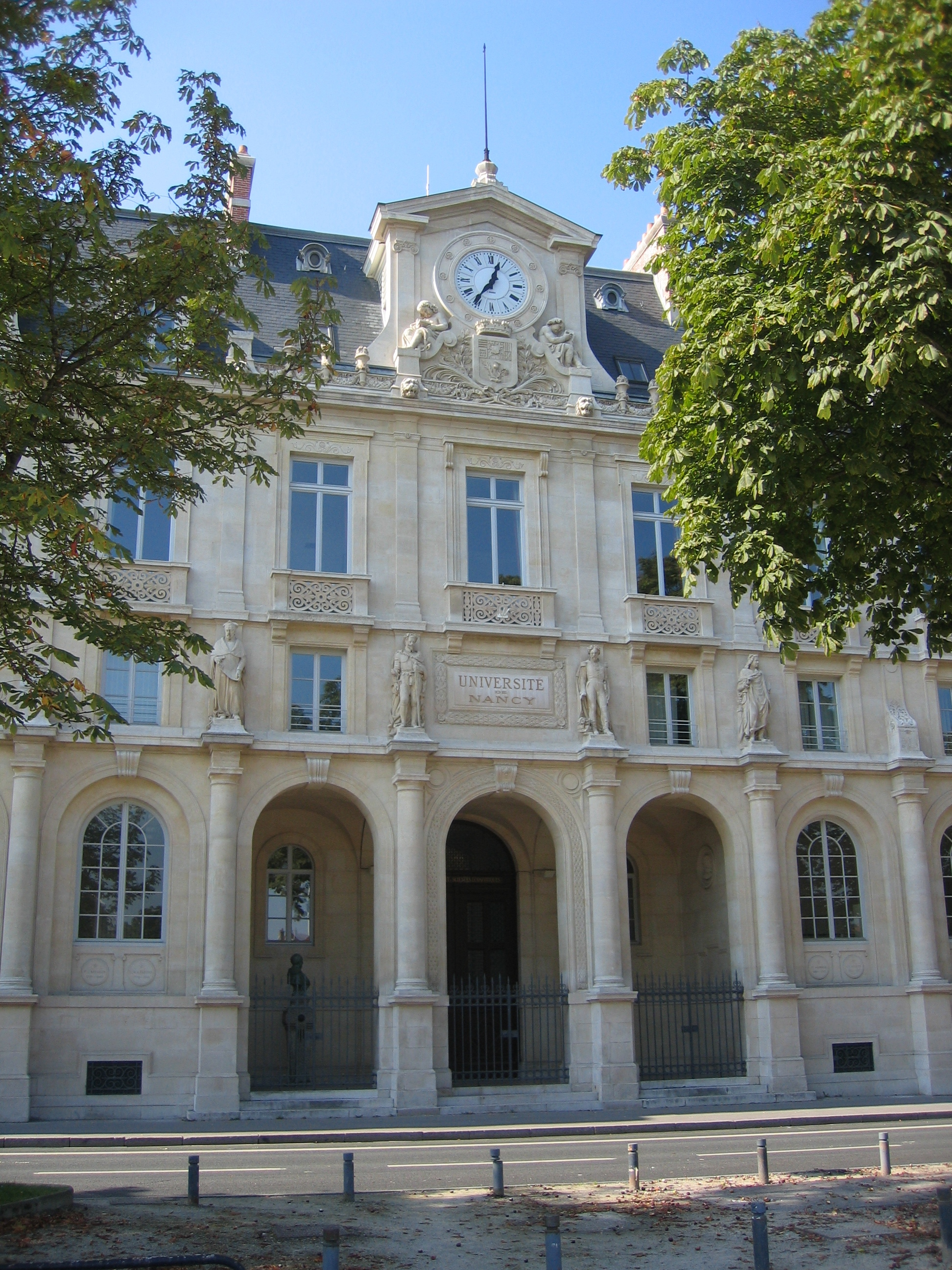
- Type: Public
- Active: 1970–2012
- Affiliations: Nancy-Université
- President: François Le Poultier
- Location: 3 Godefroi de Bouillon, Nancy, 54000, Nancy, Lorraine, France

Nancy 2 University (French: Université Nancy 2) was a French university located in Nancy, France. It was a member of the Nancy-Université federation, a group of the three higher education institutions in Nancy. It merged with Nancy-I, Paul Verlaine University – Metz, and the INPL forming the University of Lorraine. The merger process started in 2009 with the creation of a "pôles de recherche et d'enseignement supérieur" or PRES and was completed 1 January 2012.

== Teaching ==
Nancy 2 provided teaching for 22 Bachelor's degrees and 32 Master's degrees, and approximately 8,000 degrees were attained in 2004/05.

There were two semesters, each semester followed by an exam period, and another exam period in June for resit examinations. Semesters lasted 12 weeks each. During the university year, public holidays were observed as well as longer holidays (either one or two weeks) such as All Saints' Day, Christmas, Easter and a "February holiday", roughly equivalent to spring break.

== Staff and students ==
Nancy 2 was home to 611 researchers/teachers and 496 administrative personnel. and contains almost 12,700 students at Bachelor's level, 3,400 at Master's level and 1,300 in other qualifications.

== Structure ==
Nancy 2 is organized into 7 different faculties (UFR stands for Unités de Formation et de Recherche, meaning Research and Training Units):

- UFR "Knowledge of Man", which refers to subjects such as psychology.
- UFR Foreign Languages and Cultures
- UFR Arts
- UFR Science of Languages (Linguistics)
- UFR Historical and Geographic Sciences, Musicology
- UFR Faculty of Law, Economic and Management Sciences
- UFR I.T. and Mathematics

The university also contained eight institutes:

- European University Centre (CEU)
- Commercial Institute of Nancy (ICN)
- Superior Institute of Administration and Management (ISAM-IAE Nancy)
- Institute for Preparation for General Administration (IPAG)
- European Institute of Cinema and Audiovisual (IECA)
- Regional Institute of Work (IRT)
- University Institute of Epinal (Hubert Curien)
- University Institute of Technology Nancy (Charlemagne)

== See also ==
- List of public universities in France by academy
- Nancy-Université federation
- University of Lorraine
