= 2003 World Interuniversity Games =

The 2003 World Interuniversity Games were the fifth edition of the Games (organised by IFIUS), and were held in Rome, Italy.
