= Antwerp University Association =

Coordinates: 51.1844°N 4.4203°E

The Antwerp University Association (in Dutch: Associatie Universiteit & Hogescholen Antwerpen or AUHA) is a Belgian association for higher education, with members located primarily in Antwerp. The leading institute is the University of Antwerp.

== Introduction ==
The association was founded on September 1, 2003 by 5 founding members. Typical aspects of the Antwerp Association are:

- regional concentration
- confederal organisation
- active pluralism
- several unique courses (f.e. dance, nautic sciences, new product development)
- large concentration of courses in arts and culture (visual arts, cultural management, dance, drama, filmstudies, music, theatre).

== Members ==
- University of Antwerp, with campuses in Antwerp & Wilrijk
- Artesis Hogeschool Antwerpen, with campuses in Antwerp, Merksem, Lier & Turnhout
- Hogere Zeevaartschool Antwerpen, located in Antwerp
- Karel de Grote-Hogeschool, with campuses in Antwerp, Hoboken & Borgerhout
- Plantijn Hogeschool, with campuses in Antwerp & Boom
