= Nancy-Université =

French public cluster of research and higher education institutions

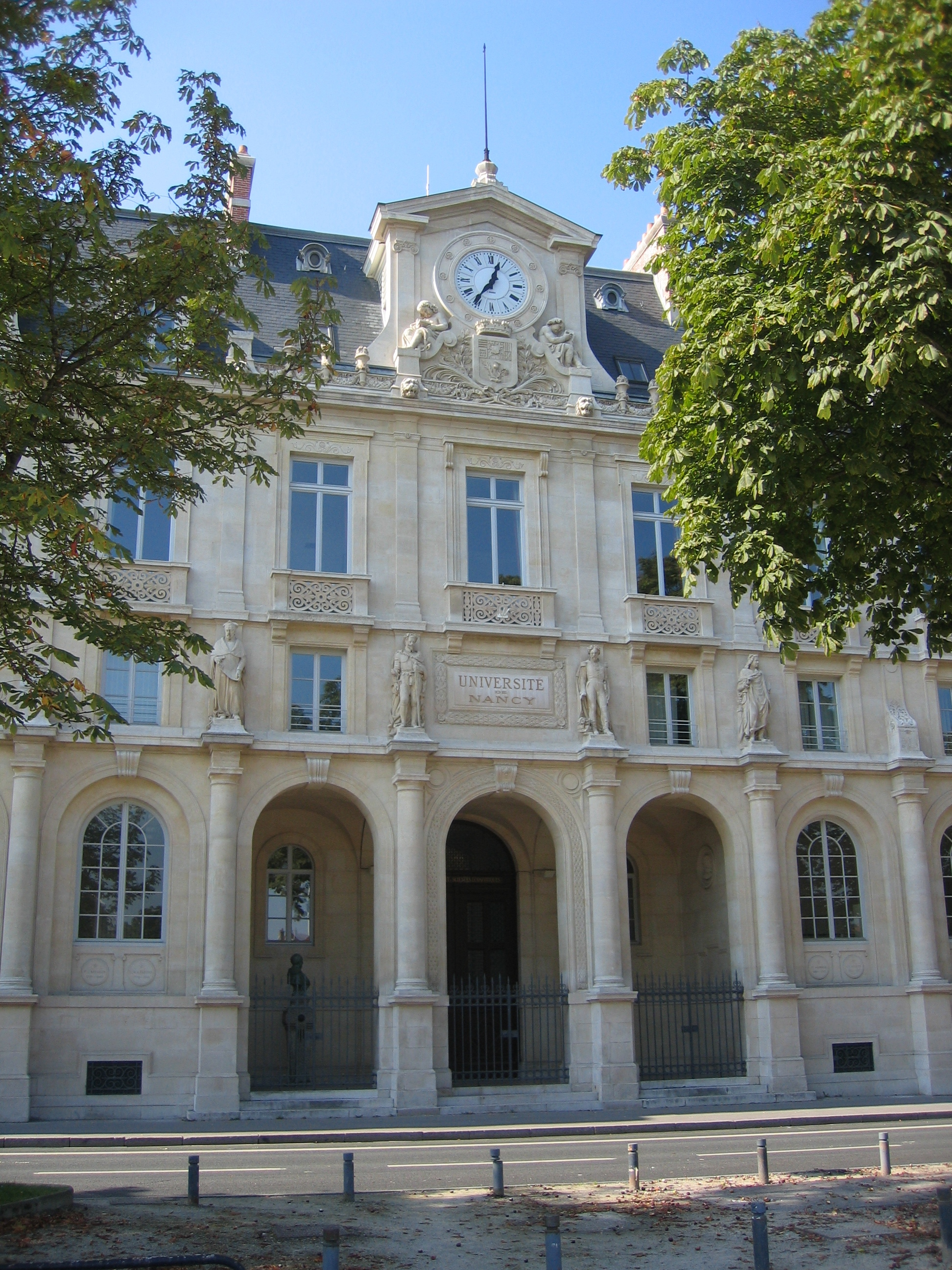
University of Nancy

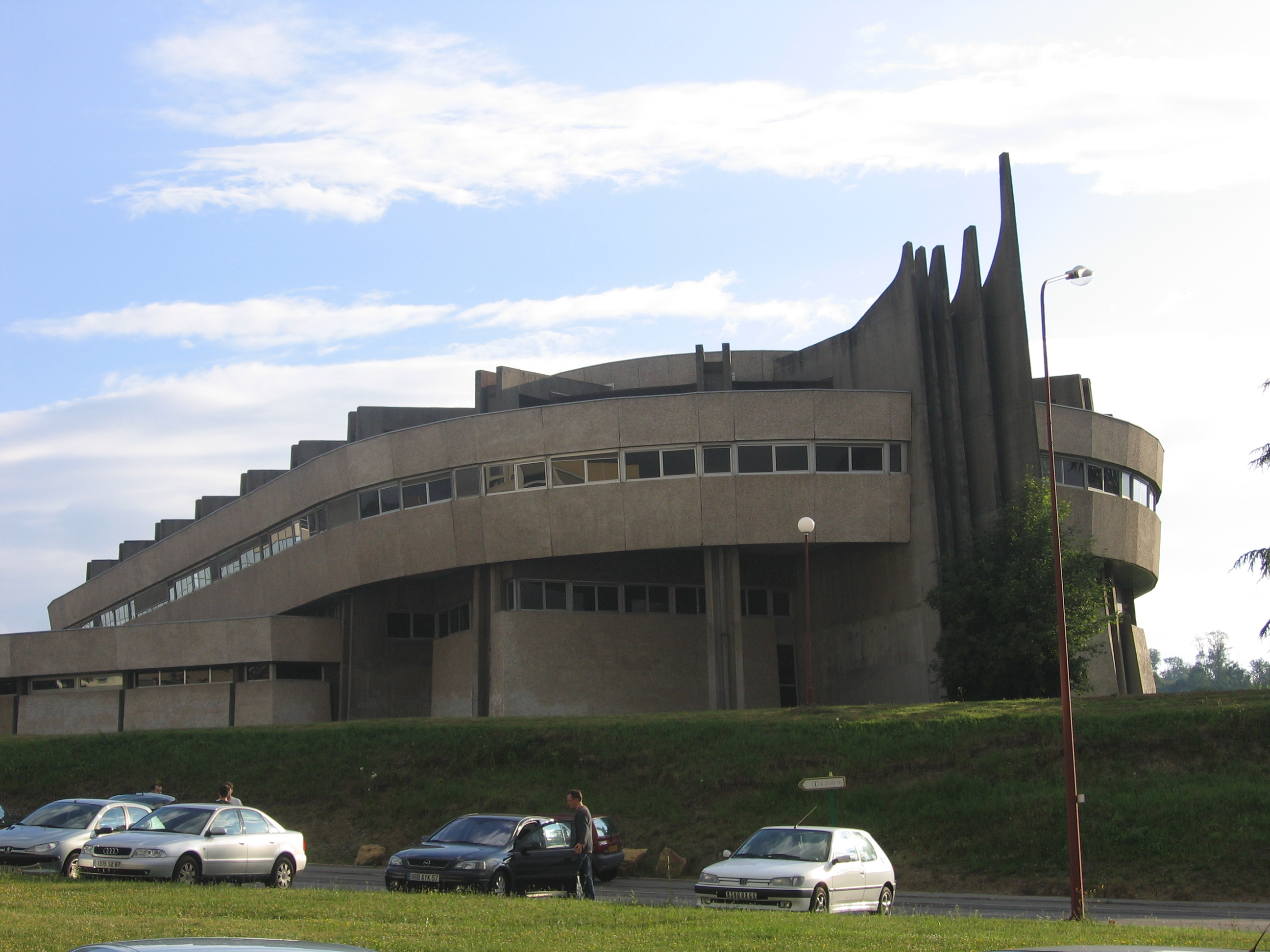
A building of Nancy-Université

Nancy-Université was a French federal university which federated the three principal institutes of higher education in Nancy, Lorraine.

Nancy-Université existed until 2012, when its member institutions were merged into the University of Lorraine:

- Henri Poincaré University (UHP, also known as Nancy 1): natural sciences, wrapping several faculties and engineering schools;
  - École Supérieure des Sciences et Technologies de l'Ingénieur de Nancy: general engineering
  - Telecom Nancy: Computer science and engineering
- Nancy 2 University: social sciences
- Institut national polytechnique de Lorraine (Lorraine INP): It federates 11 engineering schools.

With over 50,000 students, Nancy had the fifth largest student population in France.

== Libraries ==
Nancy-Université has several academic libraries. The academic library of Nancy 2 University, opened by French president Albert Lebrun, contains around 500 000 documents, among which at least 250 000 are books, in 35 locations.

== History ==
The original University of Lorraine was founded in 1572 in the nearby city of Pont-à-Mousson by Charles III, duke of Lorraine, and Charles, Cardinal of Lorraine, and was then run by the Jesuits. The university was transferred to Nancy in 1768. The University of Nancy was closed by the revolutionaries in 1793, and reopened in 1864.

== Notable personnel ==
- François Gény (1861–1959), French professor and jurist who introduced notion of "free scientific research" in positive law.
- Laurent Schwartz (1915-2002) was a researcher and teacher at the university when he received the Fields Medal in 1950.
- Jean-Pierre Serre (1926-alive) was a "maître de conférences" (MCF) at the university when he received the Fields Medal in 1954.

== See also ==
- List of early modern universities in Europe
- List of public universities in France by academy
