= Ural State University of Railway Transport =

Public university in Ekaterinburg, Russia

Coordinates: 56°50′56″N 60°34′37″E

The Ural State University of Railway Transport
- Уральский государственный университет путей сообщения
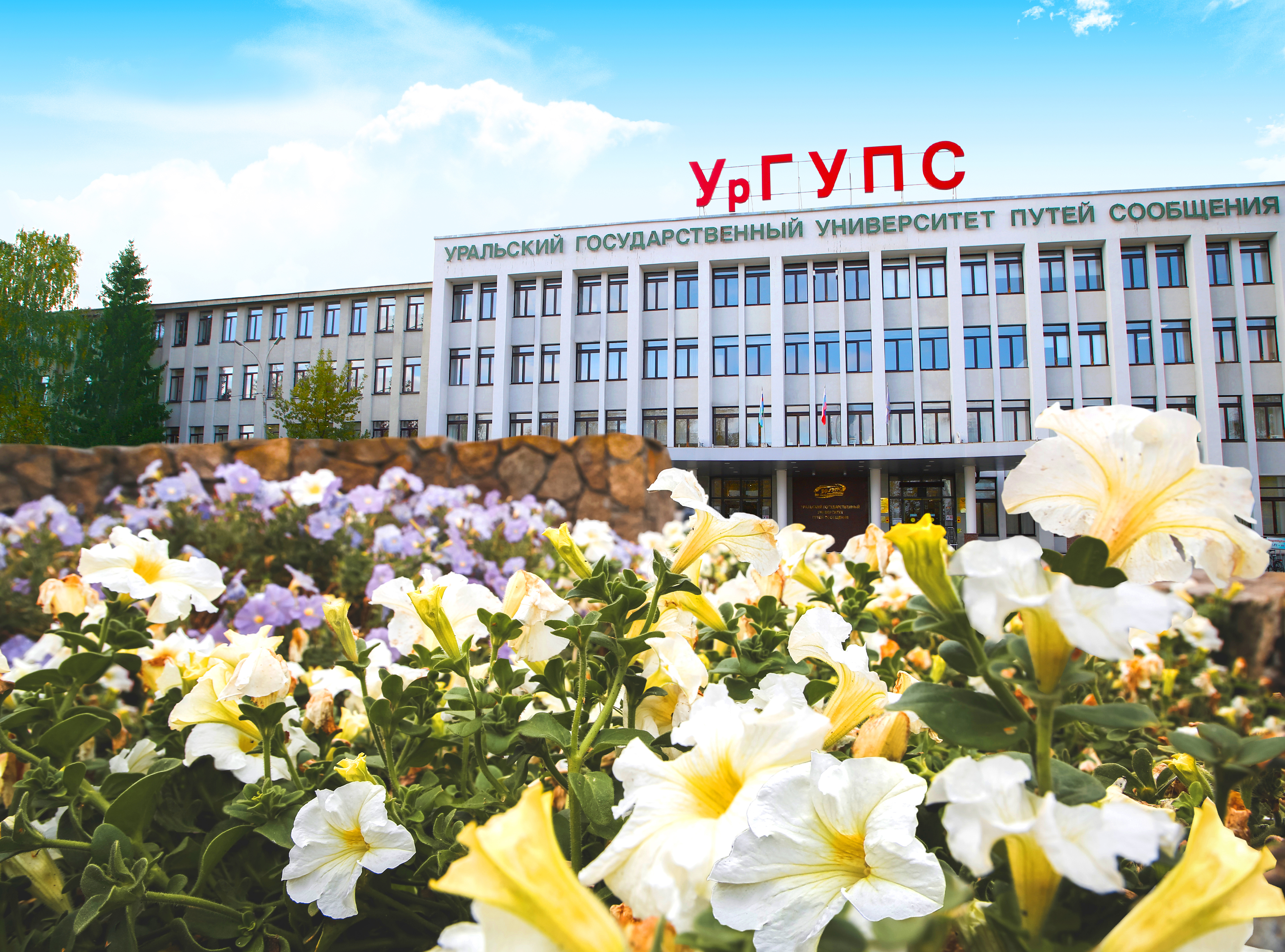
- Other names: USURT
- Motto: With us to success!
- Type: Public
- Established: 1956
- Rector: Alexandr G. Galkin
- Academic staff: over 900
- Students: over 18,000
- Location: Yekaterinburg, Urals Federal District, Russia
- Colours: Blue and Green
- Website: www.usurt.ru/en

Ural State University of Railway Transport, in abbreviated form USURT (Russian: Уральский государственный университет путей сообщения) is a public university situated in Yekaterinburg, Russia. It was founded in 1956. USURT is a multidisciplinary technical university mainly focused on training of railway transport specialists of the Urals Federal District.

USURT is a vertically integrated educational complex located in the territory of five constituent entities of the Russian Federation: Yekaterinburg, Perm, Kurgan, Chelyabinsk, Tyumen. The university complex includes the head university in Yekaterinburg, a railway transport college, a medical college, institutes in Chelyabinsk, Perm, and Kurgan, branches in Nizhny Tagil and Tyumen, a representative office in Kartaly.

== History ==
In the mid-twentieth century, the importance of railway transportation increased, especially in the Ural-Siberian zone. There was an urgent need to create an engineering university that would train personnel for railways.

On November 17, 1956, Ural Electromechanical Institute of Railway Engineers was opened. On November 16, 1964, the doors of the first stage of the main educational building opened. In 1966, building faculty was opened. In 1975, the departments of building structures and building production began their work. The number of students increased from 600 to 7,000, teaching staff increased to 357, 45 percent of whom had academic degrees and titles.

In 1992, the university passed attestation, and in 1993, licensing. In 1994, the university received a new status and was renamed to Ural State Academy of Railway Transport (USART). International relations of the university began to develop actively. In 1999, the academy received the status of a technical university - Ural State University of Railway Transport (USURT) based on the results of its work and the quality of specialists' training.

== Rankings ==
USURT is the only transport university included in the Top-100 universities in Russia according to the results of the WSJ agency ranking. USURT ranks 23rd in the annual international Eurasian University Ranking.

== Structure ==
The University includes:

6 faculties and 21 departments:

- Electromechanical Faculty
- Electrotechnical Faculty
- Building Faculty
- Operation of Transportation Processes Faculty
- Mechanical Faculty
- Economics Faculty
- College of Railway Transport
- Medical College
- Chelyabinsk Institute of Railway Transport
- Kurgan Institute of Railway Transport
- Perm Institute of Railway Transport
- Branch of USURT in Tyumen
- Branch of USURT in Nizhny Tagil
- Branch of USURT in Zlatoust
- Representative office in Kartaly
- Academy of Corporate Education, which includes Institute of Additional Vocational Education, Institute of Correspondence Education, Institute of Distance Learning, Training Centers.

Staff and students:

- Over 18 000 students
- More than 900 highly qualified teachers (doctors and candidates of science)

Study period:

- Bachelor's degree – 4 years of study
- Specialist degree – 5 years of study
- Master's degree – 6 years of study
- Postgraduate degree – 3-4 years of study

== Directions of training ==
Secondary vocational education

- 08.02.10 "Railway Construction, Track and Track Facilities" (full-time or extramural);
- 09.02.01 "Computer Systems and Complexes" (full-time or extramural);
- 11.02.06 "Technical Operation of Transport Electronic Equipment (by type of transport)" (full-time or extramural);
- 13.02.07 "Power Supply (by sector)" (full-time or extramural);
- 23.02.01 "Organization of Transportation and Management of Transport (by type)" (full-time or extramural);
- 23.02.06 "Technical Operation of Railway Rolling Stock" (full-time or extramural);
- 27.02.03 "Automation and Telemechanics on Railway Transport" (full-time);
- 31.02.01 "Medical care" (full-time);
- 34.02.01 "Nursing care" (full-time or extramural);
- 38.02.01 "Economics and Accounting (by sector)" (full-time).

Higher education – Specialist's degree programs

- 23.05.03 "Railway Rolling Stock" (full-time or extramural);
- 23.05.04 "Railway Operation" (full-time or extramural);
- 23.05.05 "Train Traffic Support Systems" (full-time or extramural);
- 23.05.06 "Construction of Railways, Bridges and Transport Tunnels" (full-time or extramural).

Higher education – Bachelor's degree programs

- 08.03.01 "Construction" (full-time or extramural);
- 09.03.02 "Information Systems and Technologies" (full-time or extramural);
- 10.03.01 "Information Security" (full-time);
- 13.03.02 "Power Engineering and Electrical Engineering" (full-time or extramural);
- 15.03.06 "Mechatronics and Robotics" (full-time);
- 20.03.01 "Technosphere Security" (full-time or extramural);
- 23.03.01 "Technology of Transport Processes" (full-time or extramural);
- 23.03.03 "Operation of transport-technological machines and complexes" (full-time or extramural);
- 27.03.04 "Management in technical systems" (full-time);
- 38.03.01 "Economics" (full-time, extramural, part-time);
- 38.03.02 "Management" (full-time, extramural, part-time)
- 38.03.03 "Personnel Management" (full-time, extramural, part-time);
- 39.03.01 "Sociology" (full-time);
- 43.03.02 "Tourism" (full-time).

Higher education - Master's degree programs

- 08.04.01 'Construction' (full-time, correspondence form);
- 09.04.02 'Information systems and technologies' (full-time);
- 10.04.01 'Information security'(full-time);
- 13.04.02 'Electric power and electrical engineering' (full-time, correspondence form);
- 15.04.06 'Mechatronics and robotics' (full-time);
- 20.04.01 'Technosphere safety' (full-time, correspondence form);
- 23.04.01 'Technology of transport processes' (full-time, correspondence form);
- 23.04.03 'Operation of transport and technological machines and complexes' (full-time, correspondence form);
- 38.04.01 'Economics' (full-time, part-time);
- 38.04.02 'Management' (full-time, part-time);
- 38.04.03 'Personnel management' (full-time, part-time)

Higher education - postgraduate programs

- 09.06.01 'Computer Science and computer engineering' (full-time);
- 10.06.01 'Information security' (full-time);
- 13.06.01 'Electrical and thermal engineering' (full-time);
- 23.06.01 'Equipment and technologies of land transport' (full-time);
- 27.06.01 'Management in technical systems' (full-time);
- 38.06.01 'Economics' (full-time).

== Campus ==
One of the advantages of the Ural State University of Railway Transport is not only its unique location, but also the internal structure of the territory and the campus, its compactness. In 2021, USURT joined the Association of Green Universities of Russia.

== Student life ==
There are about 20 creative groups in USURT. The University has established the Center for Innovation and Technology based on the principle of FabLab (international movement of manufacturing laboratories).

== Sports ==
USURT pays great attention to students' physical improvement and healthy lifestyle. The university has created all conditions for the development of both mass sports and sports of higher achievements.

== International activities ==
USURT conducts purposeful international activities, and is actively involved in international projects, primarily with the countries of the Pacific region, Southeast Asia - Mongolia, Kazakhstan, China, as well as with the CIS countries.

The University participates in the work of such international organizations as: OSJD (Organization for Cooperation of Railways), the Association of Rectors of Transport Universities of Russia and China, the Council for Education and Science at the KTS CIS, is an official member of the International Association of Transport Universities of the Asia-Pacific region, the Association of Rectors of Transport Universities of Russia and France, BRICS countries, Russia and China. Cooperation with such European countries as Germany, Poland, Spain, Serbia is also actively developing.

USURT is also implementing DAAD, ERASMUS+ programs, scientific and technical cooperation projects with China.
