= Mirny Polytechnic Institute =

Polytechnic institute in Mirny, Russia

Coordinates: 62°33′N 113°58′E

The Mirny Polytechnic Institute (located in Mirny, Yakutsk) is a branch of the North-Eastern Federal University. It was founded on 2 March 1994. Its foundation and the dynamic development took place due to the decision of Mikhail Nikolayev, the first President of the Republic of Sakha (Yakutia). Mirny Polytechnic Institute is headed by one of its co-founders, Professor Albina A. Goldman.

Today the Institute is the education, cultural and scientific center of Western Yakutia. Courses are given in: English and literature, fundamental and applied mathematics, power supply of mining industry, electro-mechanics, petroleum engineering, and other studies. In 2017 the Institute opened a new classroom and laboratory building.
