= Academy of Labour and Social Relations =

Coordinates: 55.756°N 37.618°E

- Академия труда и социальных отношений
- Location: 119454, Moscow, ул. Лобачевского д. 90, Russia
- Website: https://www.atiso.ru/

The Academy of Labour and Social Relations (Russian: Академия труда и социальных отношений) is a university in Russia, located in Moscow. It was founded in 1919.
