= Ukhta State Technical University =

Technical university in Ukhta, Russia

- Ухтинский государственный технический университет
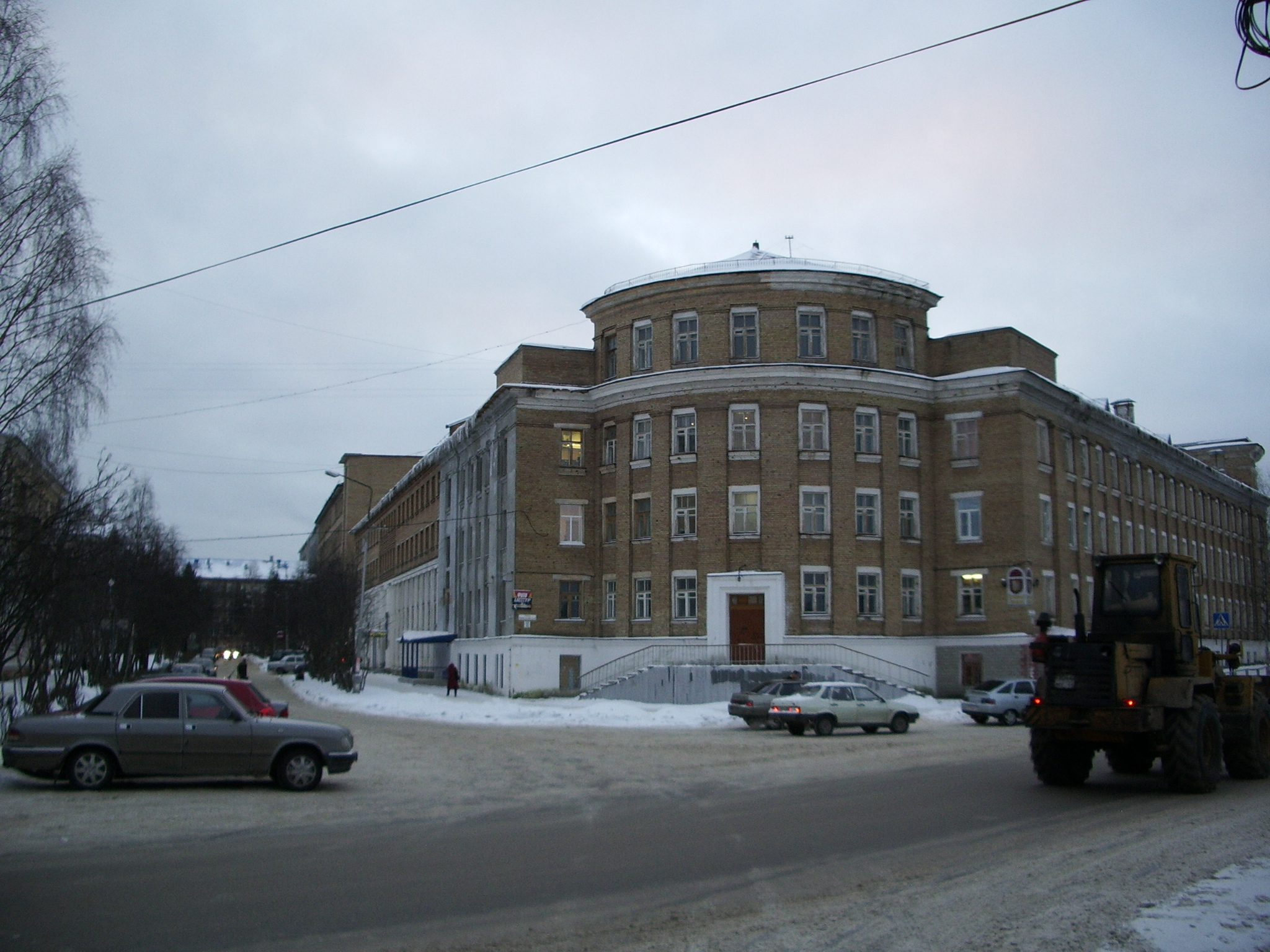
- Type: Public
- Established: 1958
- Rector: Aginey Ruslan Viktorovich
- Students: 12000
- Postgraduates: 500
- Location: Pervomayskay street 13, Ukhta, Komi Republic, Russia; 63.5566776°N 53.6936572°E
- Campus: Urban
- Website: http://en.ugtu.net

Ukhta State Technical University (Russian: Ухтинский государственный технический университет) is a representative of Russian oil and gas universities and a technical higher education institution of the European North of Russia. The university was founded on the basis of the Ukhta Industrial Institute (the institute was founded in 1967). By this time, more than 25000 engineers and economists had graduated in oil, geology, building, and timber industry majors. After the successful attestation on April 14, 1999, the institute was granted a status of a State Technical University.

Aginey Ruslan (Агиней Руслан Викторович]), the rector of the Ukhta State Technical University has signed a letter of support for the Russian invasion of Ukraine.

== Campus ==
Ukhta State Technical University has a campus with over 7,000 undergraduate and graduate students living in its buildings. University campus consists of:

- USTU buildings (“A”, “B”, “V”, “G”, “D”, “E”, “K”, “L”, “N”)
- Forest College
- Mining and Petroleum College
- Sports complex Burevestnik
- Production-and-Training Center "GAZPROM TRANSGAZ UKHTA"
- Business Incubator
- Training Ground
- Dormitories (14 buildings)
- Medical Service
- Dining facilities
- Recreational center "Krokhal"
- Library
- Swimming Pool

== Institutes ==
- Institute of Geology, Oil and Gas Production and Pipeline Transportation
- Institute of Civil Building and Engineering
- Institute of Economics, Management and Information Technology
- Institute of Advanced Training
- Institute of Industry

== Programs of higher education ==
- Bachelor:
- Ecology and Management of Natural Resources;
- Architecture;
- Construction (Civil Engineering);
- Computer Science and Engineering;
- Information Systems and Technologies;
- Power and Electrical Engineering;
- Mechanical Engineering (Technological machines and equipment);
- Technosphere Safety;
- Oil and Gas Engineering;
- Land-utilization and Cadastral Register;
- Standardization and Metrology;
- Technology of Timber Cutting and Timber Processing Industries;
- Economics;
- Management;
- Advertising and Public Relations;
- Document studies and Archives;
- Physical Training;
- Specialist:
- Applied Geology;
- Technologies of Geological Exploring
- Master:
- Construction (Civil Engineering):
- «Theory of designing buildings and structures»
- «Architectural and Construction Materials»
- «Heat and gas supply settlements and enterprises»
- «Urban and industrial enterprises water supply»
- Power and Electrical Engineering:
- «Automated electromechanical complexes and systems»
- Mechanical Engineering (Technological machines and equipment):
- «Machines and Equipment for Forestry»;
- «Machines and equipment for oil and gas fields»
- Technosphere Safety:
- «Safety of technological processes and production of oil and gas industry»
- Oil and Gas Engineering:
- «Horizontal drilling»
- «Drilling mud practices»
- «Drilling Fluid Engineering»
- «Development of oil fields»
- «Reliability of oil pipelines and oil storage»
- «Development and exploration hydrocarbon fields with horizontal wells in the Arctic shelf»
- «Reliability of pipeline systems of the Arctic shelf»
- Technology of Timber Cutting and Timber Processing Industries:
- «Forest Engineering»
- Management:
- «Industrial Management»

== Academic year ==
The academic year is divided into two semesters. The first semester usually runs from September to December, the second from February to June.

== Student life ==
USTU students participate in various areas of extracurricular activities. These are social, political, and cultural and educational projects.

=== Student organizations ===
- English Club
- KVN Club: Originally KVN is a Russian humour TV show and competition where teams (usually college and university students) compete by giving funny answers to questions and showing prepared sketches.

=== Arts and culture activities ===
- Afro-Dance Studio
- Angolah Dance Studio
- Duet
- Ensemble Radost
- Nargiz
- Poetry Club
- Theater
- United Bit

== International relations ==
The university has a number of relationships with schools all over the world. It has set up projects in cooperation with schools abroad such as University of Nordland, Oulu University of Applied Sciences, Freiberg University of Mining and Technology, University of Tromsø, Riga Technical University, Univerzitet u Novom Sadu, Duquesne University, Technical University of Ostrava and other. It is a member of the University of the Arctic network. However the collaboration has been paused after the beginning of the Russo-Ukrainian War in 2022.

== Branches ==
There are 2 branches of the USTU in the Komi Republic.

- Branch in Vorkuta
- Branch in Usinsk
