= Henri Poincaré University =

University in Nancy, Lorraine, France (1970–2012)

Coordinates: 48°39′56″N 6°09′34″E

- Université Henri Poincaré
- Type: Public
- Active: 1970–2012
- Affiliations: Nancy-Université
- President: Jean-Pierre Finance
- Faculty: 1,375
- Administrative staff: 1,146
- Students: 18,000
- Location: 24-30 rue lionnois - BP 60121; 54 003 Nancy Cedex; FRANCE, Nancy, France
- Website: www.uhp-nancy.fr

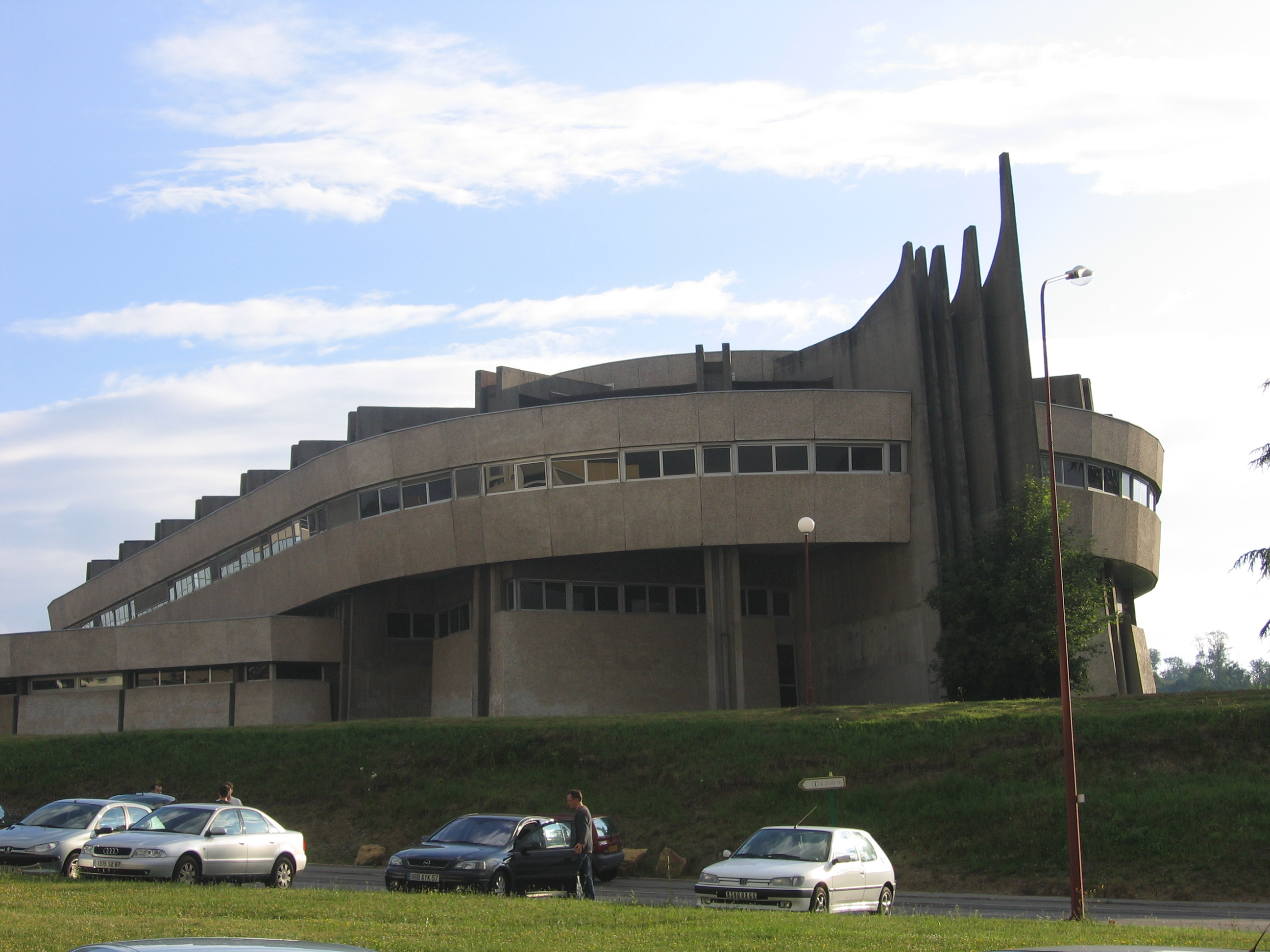
UHP's Science and Technology Campus Library in Vandoeuvre (Nancy)

The Henri Poincaré University (UHP), also known as Nancy 1 (French: Université Nancy-I), was a public research university located in Nancy, France. UHP formed the Nancy-Université federation with two other institutions in 2005. In 2012, UHP merged with Nancy 2 University and Paul Verlaine University – Metz to form the University of Lorraine.

== History ==
The first University of Lorraine was created in 1572 by the Duke Charles de Lorraine and the Cardinal Charles III, in a city near Pont-à-Mousson.

In 1968, the Faure law split the university and created three universities: Henri Poincaré University (Nancy 1), Nancy 2 University and the National Polytechnic Institute of Lorraine.

Nancy 1 merged with Nancy-II, Paul Verlaine University – Metz, and the INPL forming the University of Lorraine. The merger process started in 2009 with the creation of a "pôles de recherche et d'enseignement supérieur" or PRES and was completed 1 January 2012.

== International ==
UHP figures in the Academic Ranking of World Universities made by the Shanghai Jiao Tong University. In the year 2007, UHP ranked 305th at a worldwide scale and 124th at European scale.

== Organization and administration ==
=== Components ===
UHP had five Faculties:

- Science and Technology
- Medical School
- Pharmacy
- Dentistry
- Sports

Three Engineering Schools:

- Telecom Nancy
- Polytech Nancy (formerly named ESSTIN)
- ENSTIB

Three Institutes of Technology (IUT):

- Nancy-Brabois
- Longwy
- St Dié

And one Institute for Teacher Training (IUFM).

== Research ==
The university included a total of 44 laboratories, linked with the most important French research organizations : CNRS, INSERM, INRA and INRIA.

== See also ==
- List of public universities in France by academy
