= University of Sannio =

University in Benevento, Italy

Coordinates: 41.1274°N 14.7814°E

- Università degli Studi del Sannio
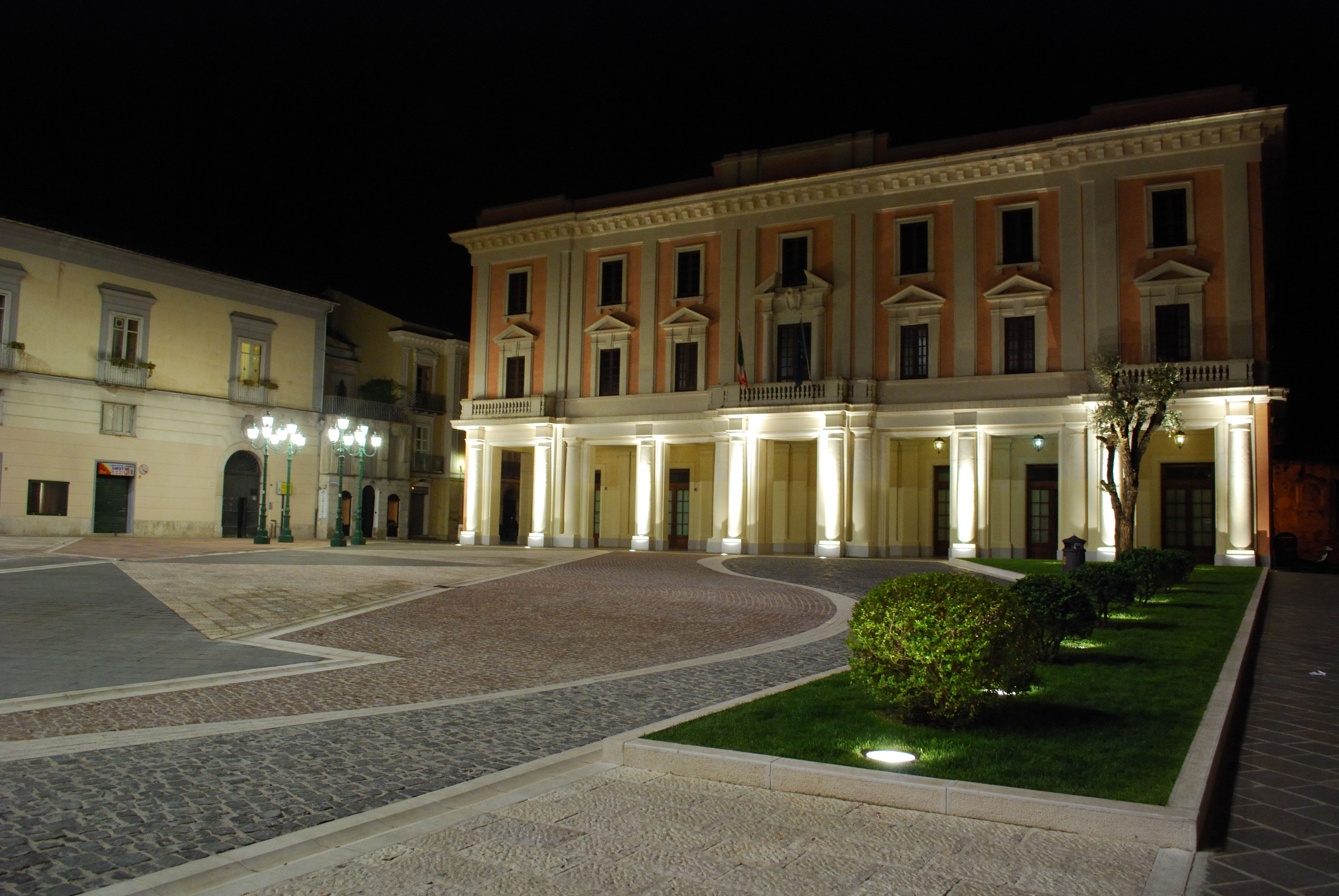
- Piazza Roma, university headquarters
- Type: State-supported
- Established: 1998
- Affiliations: Cineca, BioGeM
- Rector: Maria Moreno
- Location: Benevento, Italy
- Sports teams: CUS Benevento
- Website: www.unisannio.it/

The University of Sannio (Italian: Università degli Studi del Sannio, UNISANNIO) is a university located in Benevento, southern Italy. Founded in 1998 (being previously a part of the University of Salerno), the University of Sannio is organized in three faculties with almost 6,000 students.

== History ==
The University of Sannio began as a part of the University of Salerno. Initially, it was included in the four-year plan 1986–90. Through Rectorial decrees on September 10, 1990, the following departments were set up: the Faculty of Economic and Social Sciences (now Faculty of Economics) with the degree courses of Banking Economics, Financial Economics, Insurance Economics, and Statistics, the Faculty of Engineering with a degree course in Computer Engineering. In the three-year plan 1991–93, the Faculty of Science was set up with additional degree courses in Biology and Geology.

The Faculty of Economic and Social Sciences was managed by a Technical committee until 31 October 1994. The Faculty of Engineering was managed by the Faculty of Engineering of the University of Salerno. Since November 1, 1994 both Faculties have had an autonomous Faculty Board.

The Consortium for the Promotion of Culture and University Studies has contributed to the implementation of the university in Benevento and is still playing a major part in its promotion. This organisation was established in 1987 by the Chamber of Commerce, the Province of Benevento and the Town Hall of Benevento. Successively, other public Institutions have joined the Consortium. With the Ministerial Decree n.1524, of 29 December 1997, the University of Sannio was officially recognized and became autonomous as from 1 January 1998.

Since 2005, the University of Sannio is a partner of the Euro-Mediterranean Center for Climate Change (CMCC).

The University of Sannio is divided into three Faculties:

- The Faculty of Law, Economics, Management and Quantitative Methods includes bachelor's and master's degree in Actuarial and Statistical Science; the bachelor's degree in Business Administration and in Economics, Banking and Finance; the master's degree in Economics and Management; the 5-year master's degree in law;
- The Faculty of Engineering includes bachelor's and master's degrees in Information Engineering, Electronic Engineering, Civil Engineering, Energy Engineering; the specialist courses in Information Engineering, Electronic Engineering, Civil Engineering, Energy Engineering.
- The Faculty of Sciences includes degree courses in Biology, Geology and Biotechnology, and specialist courses in Biology, in Genetic Science and in Geological Science

== See also ==
- List of Italian universities
- Benevento
- BioGeM
