= Universidad Católica Santa María La Antigua =

Private university in Panama City

- USMA
- Motto: Intellectum da mihi ut vivam (Latin)
- Motto in English: Give me understanding to live
- Type: Private
- Established: May 27, 1965
- Affiliations: Roman Catholic
- Location: Panama City, Panama; 9.0294°N 79.5209°W
- Website: usma.ac.pa

The Catholic University of Santa María La Antigua (Spanish: Universidad Católica Santa María La Antigua; USMA) is a private university in Panama City, Panama. It was established in 1965 as the first private university in Panama. As of 2021, it had 5,879 students, with more than 80 academic programs in both undergraduate and graduate degrees.

== History ==
Founded on May 27, 1965 as the first private university in Panama by Rev. P. Benjamín Ayechu, the university began its academic activities in the Cathedral Park, in what was formerly the Archbishop's Palace, with 232 students, 9 majors and 21 professors.

Since 1976, the university has moved to its current campus, on Avenida Ricardo J. Alfaro. It also has four offices, in Colón, Chiriquí, Azuero and Veraguas.

In 2012, the National Council for University Evaluation and Accreditation of Panama (CONEAUPA), declared it as one of the accredited universities in the country.

== Campuses ==
- Panama City
- Colón
- David, Chiriquí
- Chitré, Herrera
- Santiago, Veraguas
