= Vasile Alecsandri University of Bacău =

Coordinates: 46.554212°N 26.913432°E

- Universitatea "Vasile Alecsandri" din Bacău
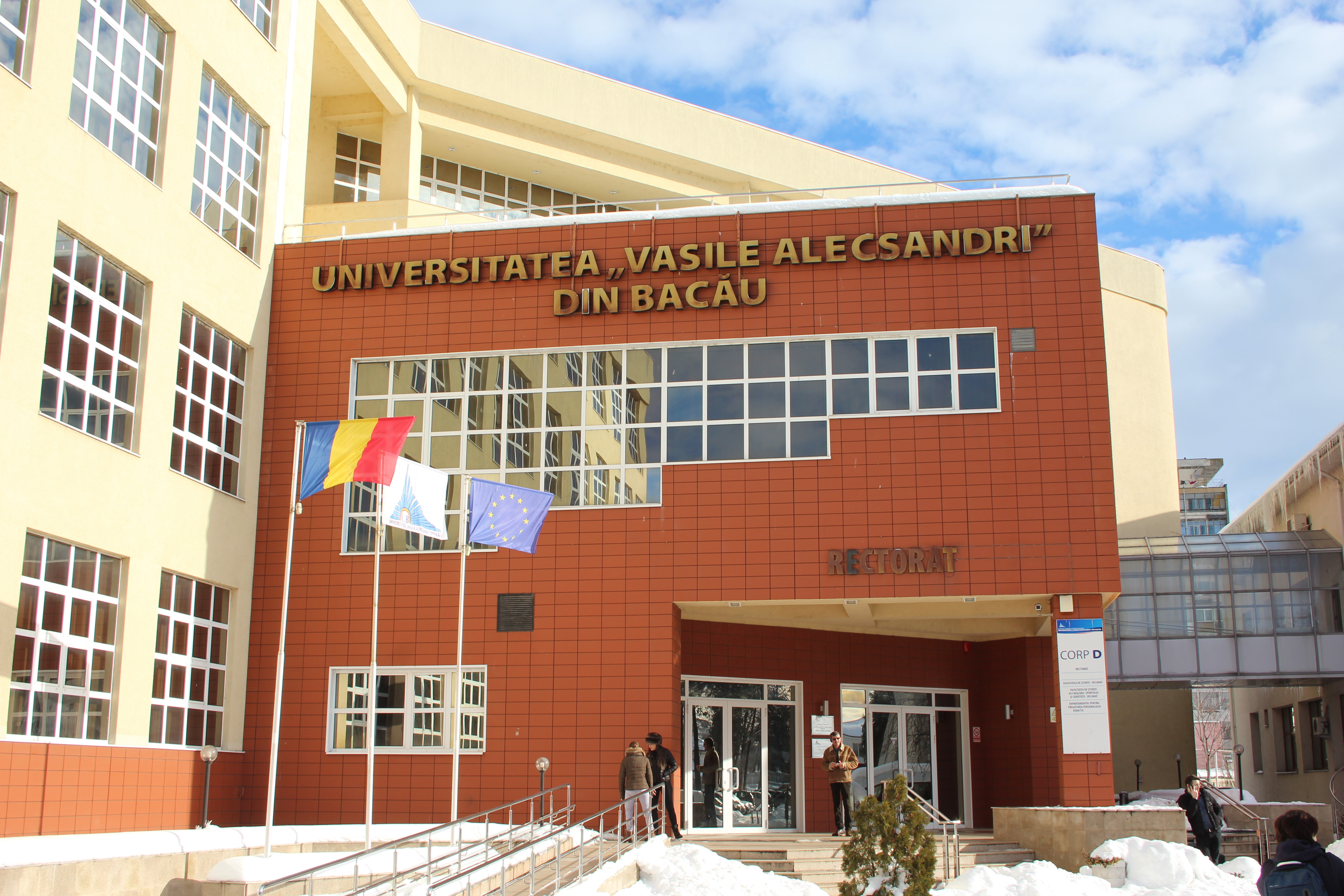
- Established: 1990
- President: Valentin Nedeff
- Rector: Carol Schnakovszky
- Students: 6,581 (2016–2017)
- Location: Bacău, Romania
- Website: www.ub.ro

The Vasile Alecsandri University of Bacău (Romanian: Universitatea "Vasile Alecsandri" din Bacău) is a public university in Romania, located in Bacău. Named in honor of the poet Vasile Alecsandri, it was founded in 1990.

== History ==
The first higher education school in Bacău was founded in 1961 as the Pedagogical Institute of Bacău. In 1984 it was transformed into the Sub-Engineering Institute, subordinated to the Technical University of Iași. In 1990, the institution became a university.

=== Timeline ===
- 1961: the Pedagogical Institute of Bacău is founded (three faculties: Humanities, Mathematics, and Natural Sciences)
  - 1964: the Faculties of History and Geography, and Physical Education are added
- 1976: renamed as the Institute of Higher Education of Bacău
  - 1976: Faculty of Engineering is founded
- 1984: renamed as the Institute of Associate Engineering (part of the Gheorghe Asachi Polytechnic Institute of Iași)
  - 1985: Inorganic Chemistry Technology study programme is introduced
  - 1986: Power Engineering study programme is introduced
- 1990: renamed as the University of Bacău (two faculties: Engineering, and Letters and Sciences)
  - 1996: the Department of Physical Education and Sports (part of the Faculty of Letters and Sciences) is transformed into the Faculty of Physical Education and Sports
  - 2002: the Faculty of Letters and Sciences is split into two faculties (Letters, and Sciences)
  - 2004: the Department of Economic Sciences (part of the Faculty of Sciences) is transformed into the Faculty of Economic Sciences
  - 2009: renamed as the Vasile Alecsandri University of Bacău

== Faculties ==
The University of Bacău has 5 faculties:

- Faculty of Economic Sciences
- Faculty of Engineering
- Faculty of Letters
- Faculty of Movement, Sports and Health Sciences
- Faculty of Sciences
