= The Hague University of Applied Sciences =

University in the Netherlands

Coordinates: 52°04′03″N 4°19′27″E

- De Haagse Hogeschool
- Motto: Let's change. You. Us. The world.
- Type: University of Applied Sciences
- Established: 1 September 1987
- Affiliations: UNESCO; Erasmus; UASNL; SURF; Uninovis Alliance
- Chairman: E.M. Minnemann
- Academic staff: 2,331
- Students: 26,331
- Location: The Hague, Zoetermeer, Delft, South Holland, Netherlands
- Campus: Multiple campuses
- Colours: Corporate grey, corporate green & white
- Website: www.thuas.com

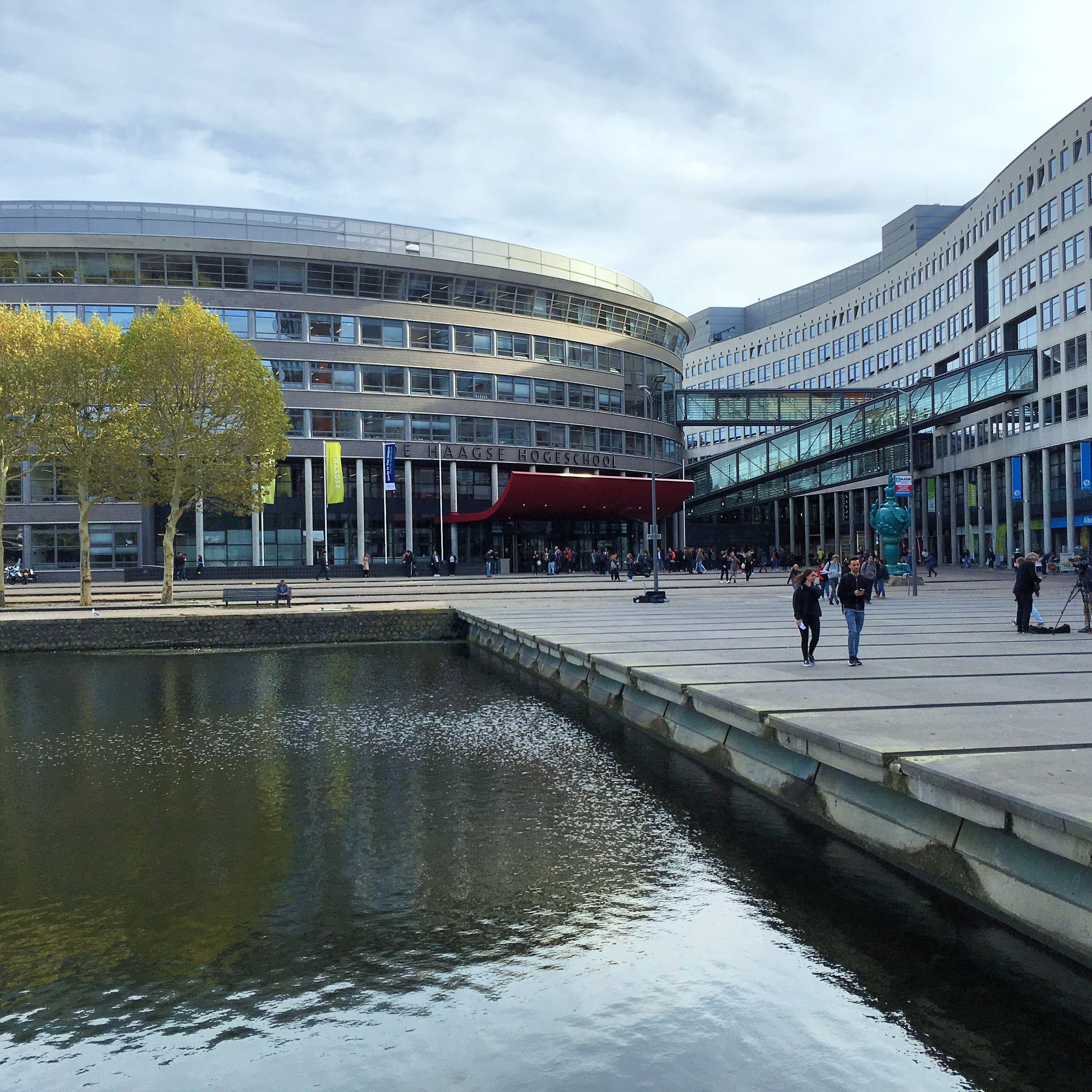
The main building of The Hague University of Applied Sciences

The Hague University of Applied Sciences (abbreviated as: THUAS; Dutch: De Haagse Hogeschool) is a university of applied sciences with its campuses located in The Hague, Delft and Zoetermeer. The main campus in The Hague is located behind The Hague Hollands Spoor railway station by the Laakhaven Canal.

== History ==
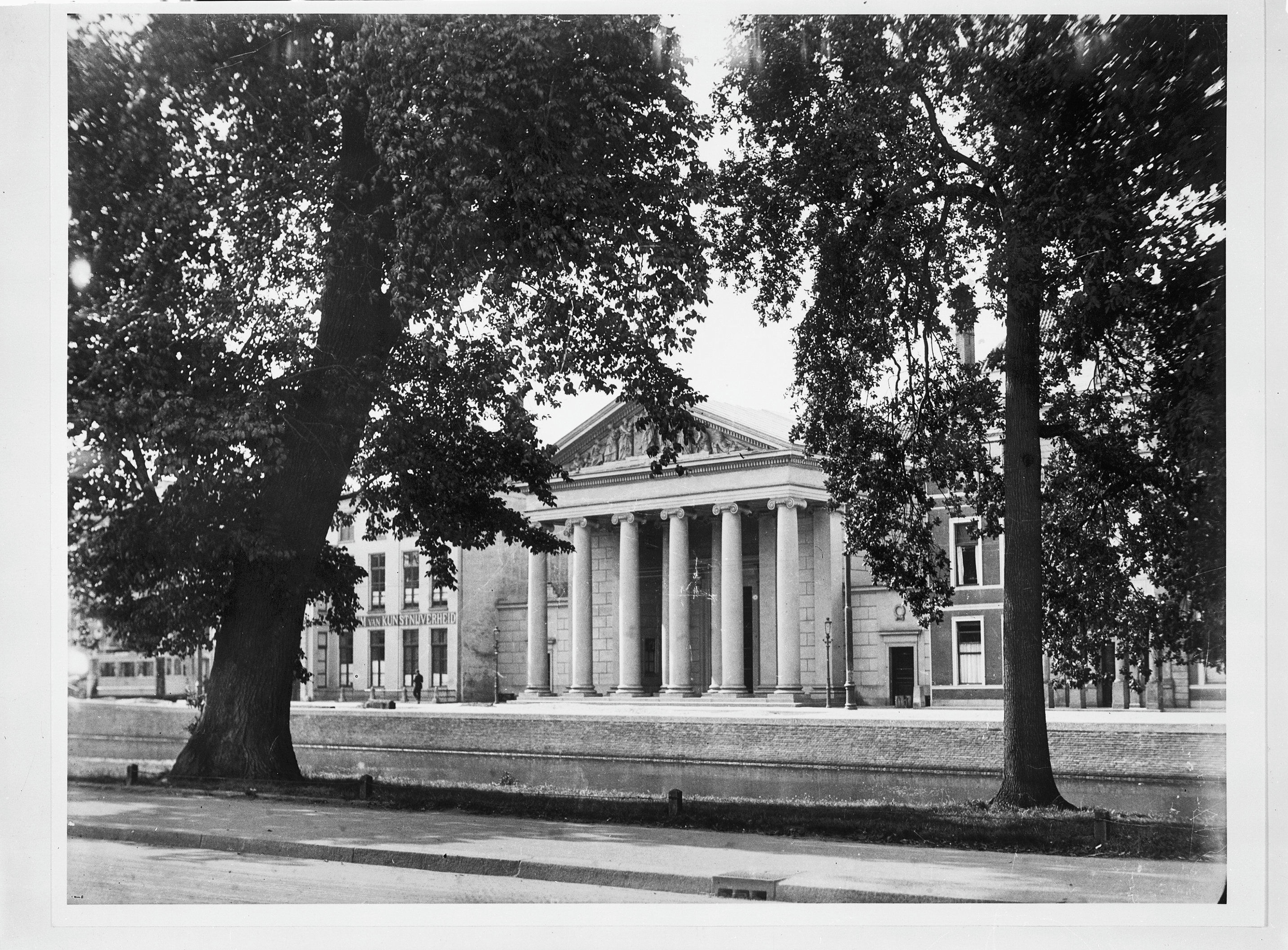
The Hogere Technische School voor Bouw- en Waterbouwkunde at the Prinsessegracht.

The Hague University of Applied Sciences was formed on 12 January 1987 through the merger of six municipal and nine special institutions of higher professional education in The Hague. Of these institutions, the Hogere Technische School voor Bouw- en Waterbouwkunde (Higher Technical School for Architecture and Hydraulic Engineering) was the oldest, with origins tracing back to the Haagsche Teeken-Academie (later Royal Academy of Art) which was founded in 1682. The university officially welcomed its first students on 1 September 1987.

In the years that followed, the university continued to expand, merging with the Technische Hogeschool Rijswijk in 2003 and opening a new building at the campus of Delft University of Technology. In 2003, the university also started the Academy for IT & Design in Zoetermeer in cooperation with the local business community. The academy, now called Faculty of IT & Design, is located at the Dutch Innovation Park in Zoetermeer. In September 2017, the Physical Education Teacher Training Programme (HALO), Sport Studies and International Sport Management degree programmes moved into Zuiderpark Sports Campus, built on the site where ADO Den Haag's Zuiderpark stadium stood until 2007. The complex that replaced the stadium contains various sports facilities as well as 12 lecture halls.

Since 2009, The Hague University of Applied Sciences has been a UNESCO Associated School.

== Campuses ==
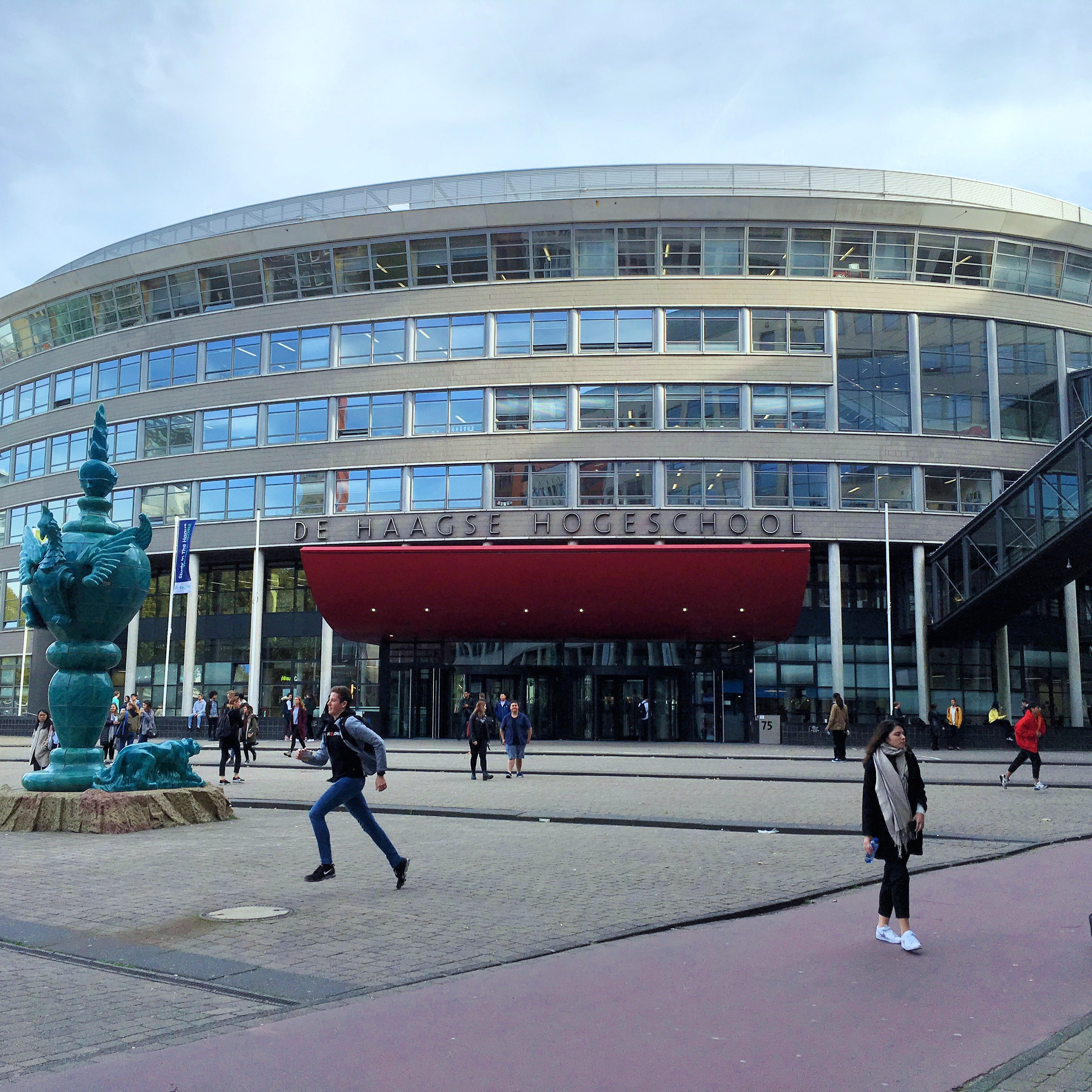
The Hague University of Applied Sciences at Laakhaven campus

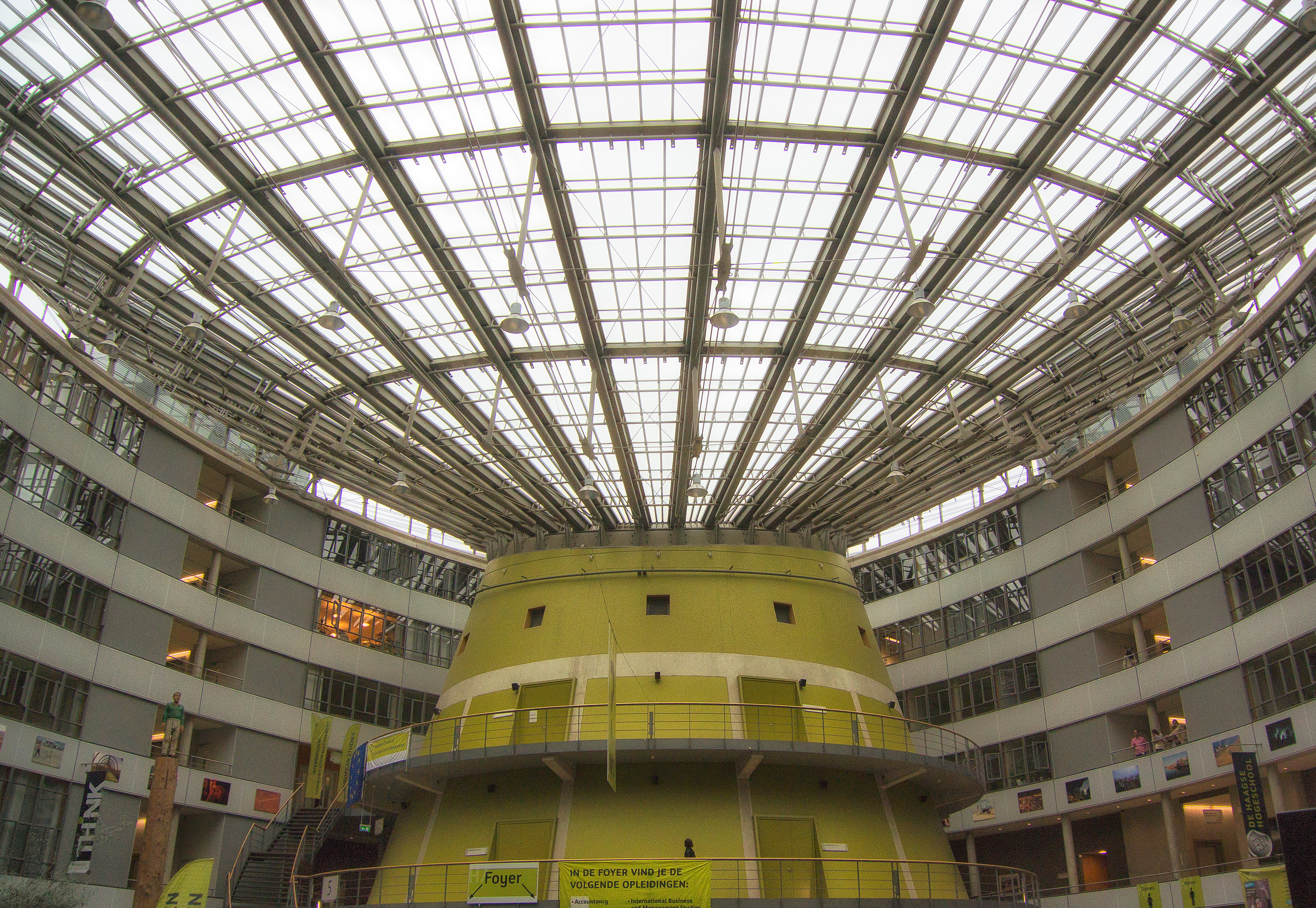
Atrium of The Hague University

The Hague University of Applied Sciences is divided into four campuses. The main campus is located in The Hague with satellite campuses in Delft, Zuiderpark Sports Campus and Zoetermeer.

=== Laakhaven ===
The main campus building was completed in 1996 and is located on Johanna Westerdijkplein in The Hague next to Hollands Spoor railway station and the Laakhaven Canal. The design includes the central glass atrium main hall, offices, laboratories and classrooms. The main campus also includes offices central to the university's administration such as the Enrolment Centre which processes applications, registrations and tuition fees, the International Office which takes care of all non-academic student matters relating to English courses, exchanges and internships and the Student Affairs Office which looks after student welfare.

The Central Library stores magazines, dissertations and electronic data resources and has 400 study areas, many with PCs and Internet connections. Other facilities include a fitness centre and sports hall, a central ICT service desk providing scanning, printing and audio-visual equipment, a health centre, a main restaurant and several departmental cafés serving snacks.

=== Delft ===
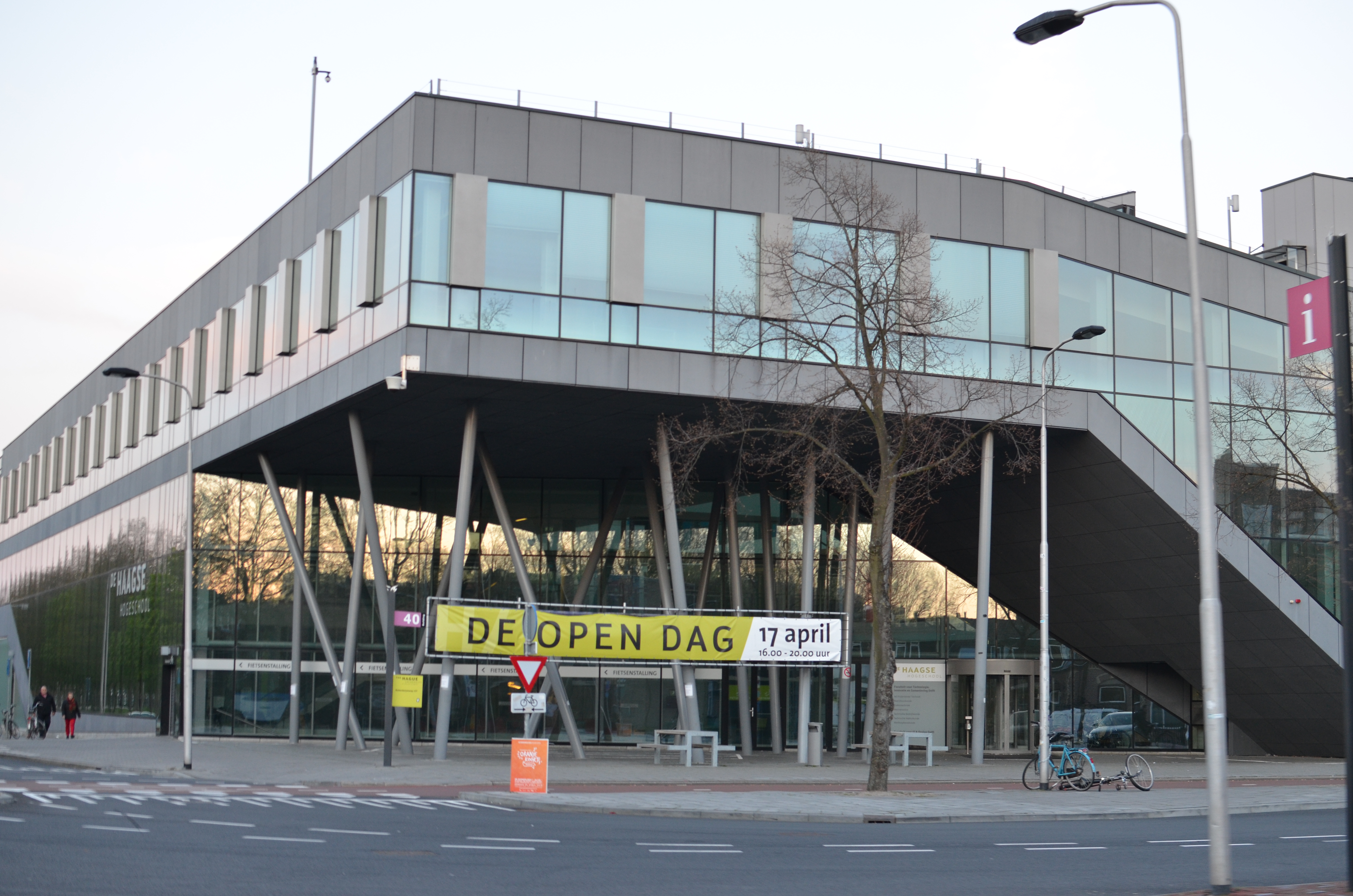
The Hague University at the Delft campus

The Hague University of Applied Sciences’ building on the Delft University of Technology campus opened in 2009. The Delft campus, venue for the Technology, Innovation and Society Academy, offers seven degrees taught in Dutch including Mathematics and Applications, Electrical Engineering, Project Leader in Engineering (associate degree), Industrial Engineering and Management, Computer Engineering, Engineering Physics, Mechanical Engineering and Mechatronics.

=== Zuiderpark Sports Campus ===
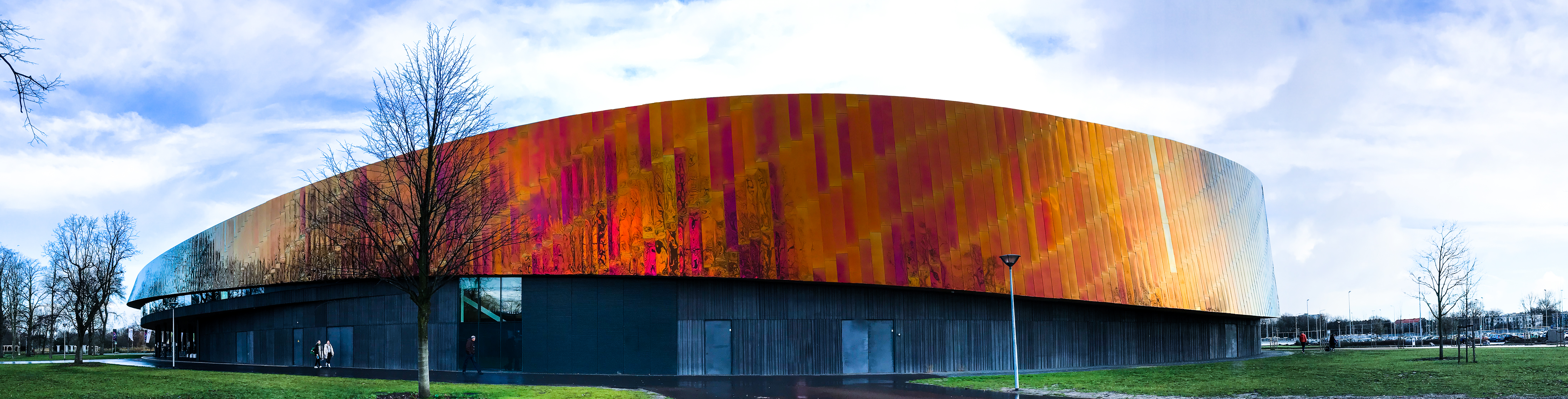
The Hague Zuiderpark Sports Campus

The Zuiderpark Sports Campus was opened in 2016 at The Hague's Zuiderpark on the site of the old ADO Den Haag football stadium. The complex is a joint venture between The Hague University of Applied Sciences, the municipality of The Hague and Vestia housing association. The Hague University of Applied Sciences' Physical Education Teacher Training (HALO) and Sport Management bachelor's degrees are taught here as well as the senior secondary vocational level (MBO) Sport and Exercise course offered by the ROC Mondriaan Regional Training Centre. The complex includes a sports hall, gymnasia, a ballroom and beach volleyball facilities.

=== Zoetermeer ===
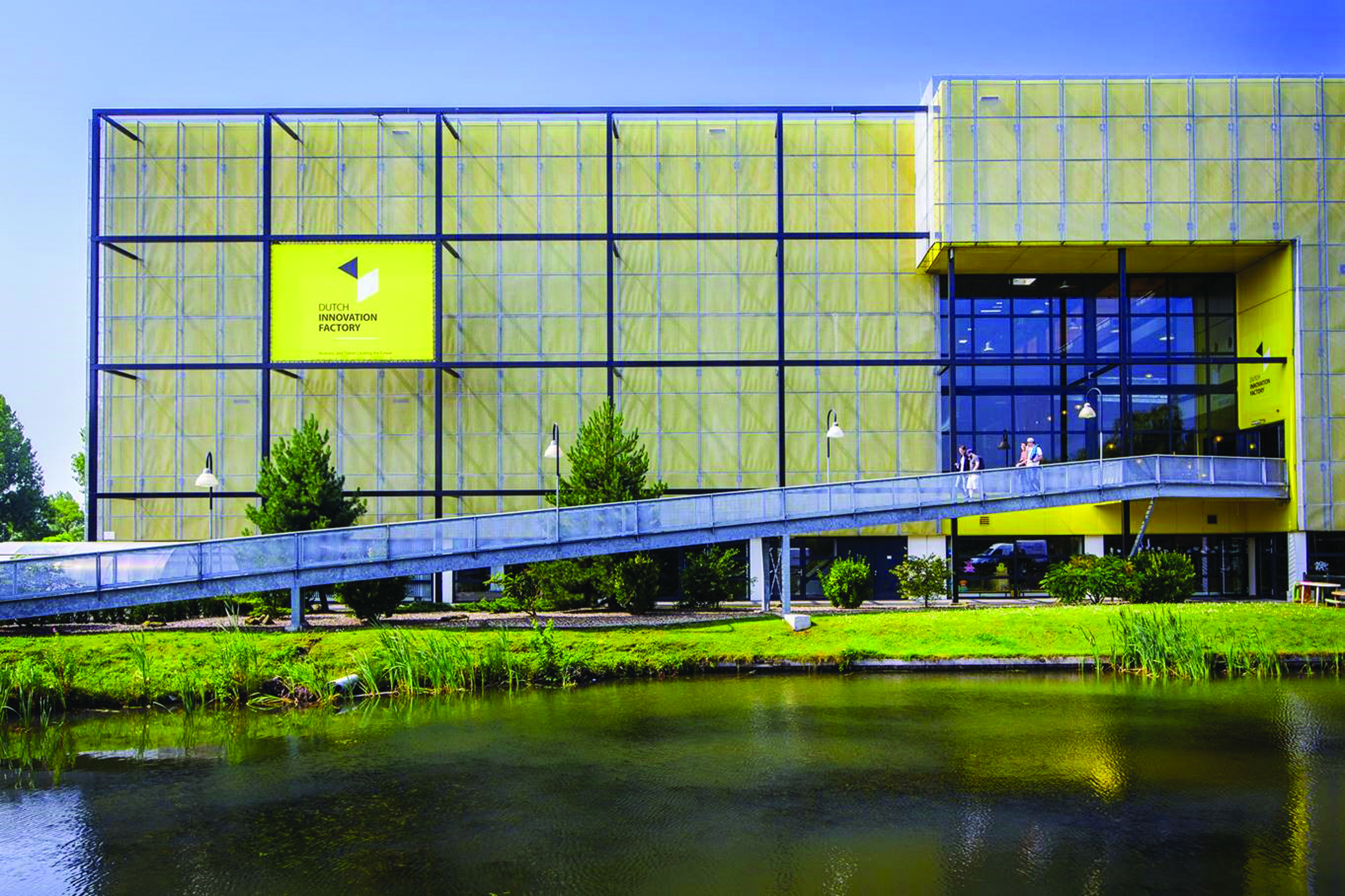
The Hague University at the Zoetermeer campus, the Dutch Innovation Factory

The Hague University of Applied Sciences established its Faculty of IT & Design in Zoetermeer, a city in the western Netherlands close to The Hague in 2003, tapping into the city's business community. In 2013 the faculty moved to the Dutch Innovation Factory, which is part of the Dutch Tech Campus. One bachelor's degree is taught here in Dutch: Computer Science.

== Organisation and administration ==
An executive board and a supervisory board govern The Hague University of Applied Sciences. The executive board is supported by service departments and an executive office support. Study programmes are grouped within academies, which are led by directors.

== Faculties ==
The Dutch higher education system allows students to obtain a bachelor's degree on successful completion of an undergraduate phase, and a master's degree after passing the graduate phase. Bachelor's degrees at The Hague University of Applied Sciences take three or four years of full-time study and require 240 European Credit Transfer and Accumulation System (ECTS) credits. One ECTS credit represents 28 hours of full-time study and the study/work load for one academic year accounts for 60 credits.

The Accreditation Organisation of the Netherlands and Flanders (NVAO) validates study programmes offered by Dutch universities. All international bachelors and masters programmes offered by The Hague University of Applied Sciences are recognised by NVAO.

EU and non-EU students must pay tuition fees for bachelor's and master's degrees and finance their living arrangements. There are a number of loans, grants and scholarships available.

The academic year at The Hague University of Applied Sciences starts in September and ends in mid-July. Each academic year is split into two semesters, which are divided into two half terms of six weeks, with a week's break in between. There is a six-week summer holiday and two-week Christmas break. Other breaks fall in February/March, May and October.

The university is organised into 7 Faculties:

- Faculty of Business, Finance & Marketing
- Faculty Public Management, Law & Safety
- Faculty of Health, Nutrition & Sport
- Faculty of IT & Design
- Faculty of Management & Organisation
- Faculty of Social Work & Education
- Faculty of Technology, Innovation & Society

== Student body ==
In 2012, 23,500 students studied at The Hague University of Applied Sciences. This number grew steadily in the following years to 25,995 in 2016. Up to 2020, the number fluctuated around 26,000, to reach the highest number ever in 2020 with 26,331 enrolled students. Overall, the student population grew by more than 12 per cent from 2012 to 2020.

The Faculty of Business, Finance & Marketing is the largest, with over 4,500 students. The most popular degree programme is the International Business bachelor’s degree programme taught in English followed by the Law and European Studies degree programmes, also taught in English. Incoming students usually have a senior general secondary education (HAVO) pre-university education (VWO) or senior secondary vocational education diploma (MBO).

With 124 different nationalities, The Hague University of Applied Sciences has an extremely international student population. Over 23,000 students at The Hague University of Applied Sciences have the Dutch nationality.

More about the student population

In 2012, 23,500 students studied at The Hague University of Applied Sciences. This number grew steadily in the following years to 25,995 in 2016. Up to 2020, the number fluctuated around 26,000, to reach the highest number ever in 2020 with 26,331 enrolled students. Overall, the student population grew by more than 12 per cent from 2012 to 2020.

Of all the seven faculties, the Faculty of Business, Finance and Marketing (BFM) is the largest, with over 4,500 students. The most popular programme is the International Business bachelor's degree programme taught in English with 1,449 students, followed by the Law (1,255 students) and European Studies (1,132 students) degree programmes, also taught in English.

Most new students came from senior general secondary education (HAVO), followed by senior secondary vocational education (MBO) and pre-university education (VWO). There are slightly more men than women studying at the university: 53 per cent to 47 per cent. The largest differences are found in the Mechanical Engineering (705 men, 54 women), Educational Theory (36 men, 731 women) and Skin Therapy (2 men, 540 women) degree programmes.

Just over 50 per cent of students at the university have a foreign background, with or without a Dutch passport. Non-westerners make up more than a third of the student population and almost 15 per cent have another background. The Faculty of Technology, Innovation and Society (TIS) has the fewest foreign students, followed by Health, Nutrition and Sport (HNS). All other faculties are more diverse. The Physical Education Teacher Training Programme (HALO) is a popular choice among native Dutch students. The International Business degree programme has the most non-Western students. Most Western students choose the English-language variant of Law.

Over 23,000 students at The Hague University of Applied Sciences have the Dutch nationality. This includes the Dutch-Caribbean students. The remainder have a total of 123 different nationalities. Nine of our students are stateless, which means that no country considers the student to be its national under its laws.

A total of 2,013 students from the EEC enrolled at the university, 1,059 students came from other countries. Most foreign students come from Germany, followed by Romania and Bulgaria. In 2020, Bolivia, Botswana, Guatemala, Honduras, Jordan, Libya, Namibia and Niger were represented by only one student. There was a first in 2020: the very first student from Panama enrolled.

The students come mainly from the city (4,842) and The Hague region (5,701). The so-called South and North Flank are both represented by over 3,200 students. About 6,000 students are from the rest of the Netherlands. A total of 2.856 students are from abroad.

Alumni

The Hague University of Applied Sciences claims over 80,000 alumni, out of which 10% living abroad.

=== Bachelor's degrees ===
As of 2012, The Hague University of Applied Sciences offered 37 full-time bachelor's degree programmes taught in Dutch in the fields of economics, healthcare, behaviour and society, information technology, education and technology.

The university also offers ten international bachelor's degrees taught in English: European Studies, Industrial Design Engineering, International and European Law, International Business, International Financial Management and Control, International Communication Management, International Public Management, Process and Food Technology, Safety and Security Management Studies and User Experience Design.

=== Master's degrees ===
The Hague University of Applied Sciences offers several master's degrees and professional courses.

Since 2004, the university has offered masters courses run by The Hague Graduate School (THGS) to ensure higher professional education for career development. Since 2012, the THGS offers seven master's degrees, of which two are organised in collaboration with the Open University.

MPC currently runs three international masters programmes taught in English: Master of Financial Management and Control, Masters in International Communication Management (MICM), Master of Business Administration (MBA). These programmes enrol students from the Netherlands and abroad.

=== Lifelong learning ===
The Hague University of Applied Sciences offers a flexible learning platform tailored to specific learning needs.

=== For working people ===
Professionals with several years of work experience can follow a part-time or dual programme at bachelor level. The university also offers an extensive range of master's degree programmes and further postgraduate education through The Hague Graduate School.

=== International exchanges ===
The Hague University of Applied Sciences welcomes around 400 exchange students from 40 nationalities on international exchanges yearly. Exchanges with universities in EU member states fall under the Erasmus programme.

=== International student exchange programs ===
Dependable on the curriculum of a course at The Hague University of Applied Sciences, a lot of students go on exchange to study at a partner university. For students to go to another university, they have to pertain a certain amount of credits to enable themselves to do their exchange. This range and amount of time depends on the various courses The Hague University of Applied Sciences offers. This University offers student exchange programs all over the globe. These programs are based upon exchange contracts with other universities to provide a wide range of opportunities for the students. Not only partners are added but from time to time partnerships also end which decreases the range of possible exchange destinations.

=== English academic preparation course ===
The Hague University of Applied Sciences (THUAS) offers six-month or one year English Academic Preparation courses (Prep School) to improve English skills and prepare students for life in the Netherlands. This concludes with an International English Language Testing System (IELTS) exam to access further courses.

== Research ==
=== Centres of Expertise ===
This practice-based research is accommodated in seven Centres of Expertise: Cyber Security, Digital Operations & Finance, Global and Inclusive Learning, Global Governance, Governance of Urban Transitions, Health Innovation and Mission Zero.

=== Research groups ===
Each Centre of Expertise within The Hague University of Applied Sciences consists of a number of research groups that collaborate with partners to research a theme. This theme is specifically related to developments in society. In 2026, over 40 research groups are conducting research at the university.

== Student life ==
The Hague University of Applied Sciences is located in The Hague.

The city is home to many important international organisations and global companies. The Hague is known as the International City of Peace, Justice and Security and is home to around 131 international institutes and 80 justice organisations. International institutions include the Permanent Court of Arbitration, the International Court of Justice, Europol and the International Criminal Court. Multinational companies and organisations, including Shell, Siemens and T-Mobile are also located in The Hague.

=== Residential life ===
The Hague University of Applied Sciences does not have student accommodation on campus. The university works with the student letting agency, DUWO, to supply rooms and apartments to students. DUWO supplies around 400 rooms and apartments to international students in The Hague.

=== Groups and activities ===
There are a number of student organisations run by The Hague University of Applied Sciences and concentrated in The Hague.

The Hague Student Union supports students in The Hague in areas such as housing, education and international issues. They run several debates a year.

The Foreign Student Service (FSS) is a national organisation for foreign students in the Netherlands or those planning to study there. It provides services such as study and residence information, publications including a monthly newsletter, help finding accommodation and social activities.

Organisations improving contact between international students include Interaccess and Erasmus Student Network (ESN). Interaccess organises speakers, presentations, festivals and debates and weekend social activities. ESN is one of the biggest student bodies in Europe with 12,000 members in 36 countries.

There are several student social groups in The Hague including the Haagsche Studenten Vereeniging (HSV), which runs the social club, Sociëteit Megara. HSV is a social group for students from The Hague, Delft, Leiden and Rotterdam organising social activities, sports, meals, society evenings, galas and parties. ACKU offers courses and theatre tickets and organises pub-crawls, concerts, exhibitions and films events.

The Hague Model United Nations Society is a student organisation, which simulates United Nations debates. Students discuss important and current issues in the international arena.

There are several student bodies covering areas of specific cultural and religious interest. HSFN is an organisation for Hindu students and students interested in Hinduism. Students interested in Indian and Pakistani culture and the Islamic religion can join Mashriq SV. EurasiaSV organises activities and events for students who come from Turkey or are interested in countries, culture and people. Christians and non-Christians can join Navigators Studentenvereniging Den Haag (NSDH) which runs parties, social events and weekly bible studies.

Musical societies include the Haags Studenten Symfonie Orkest. Rehearsals take place at The Hague University of Applied Sciences and students from any institution can join.

=== Sports ===
The Hague University of Applied Sciences Sports Office organises a range of sporting activities. Students can purchase a sports and fitness card to use the sporting facilities and join classes. Sports and classes are available for members including aerobics, capoeira, golf, lacrosse, rowing, swimming, tennis, Yoga and Zumba.

The university runs a number of internal leagues in its sports hall in disciplines such as badminton, basketball, table tennis, volleyball and indoor soccer.

The Hague offers some sports orientated clubs and organisations for students, like INTAC, which organises hockey, sailing trips and skiing and the rowing club Pelargos. The Hague University of Applied Sciences has its own sailing club, Team Haagse Hogeschool, which races to the UK every year against other university teams in the Netherlands.
