= Moscow State University of Economics, Statistics, and Informatics =

Coordinates: 56.187222°N 37.805556°E

- Московский государственный университет экономики, статистики и информатики
- Active: 1932–2015
- Administrative staff: 1100 teaching, scientific and administrative staff
- Students: 10,000 (including 350 foreign) students at main campus; 150,000 regional students networked to MESI Open and Distant Education System.
- Location: Moscow, Russia
- Website: http://www.mesi.ru

Moscow State University of Economics, Statistics, and Informatics (MESI) was a university. Plekhanov Russian University of Economics accuquired this university.

== History ==
Moscow State University of Economics, Statistics and Informatics was founded in 1932 as the Moscow Institute of National Economic Accounting, which in 1948 was reorganized into the Moscow Economic and Statistical Institute (MESI). In 1996 the college received university status and was renamed the Moscow State University of Economics, Statistics and Informatics, while maintaining the same acronym. On March 10, 2015, the Russian Minister of Education and Science signed an order merging MESI with Plekhanov Russian University of Economics. The Academic Councils of educational organizations had previously submitted a proposal to the Russian Ministry of Education and Science to merge the universities. The reason for this is unclear. On February 17, the issue of merger was considered at a meeting of the Commission for Assessing the Consequences of the Decision to Reorganize a Federal State Educational Organization under the Russian Ministry of Education and Science. Following a discussion assessing all the risks, prospects, and potential of the merger, with the participation of representatives of the Moscow Department of Education, the Council of Rectors of Universities in Moscow and the Moscow Region, the Russian Ministry of Education and Science, Plekhanov Russian University of Economics, and MESI, the Commission unanimously approved the reorganization by merging MESI with Plekhanov Russian University of Economics.

== Alumni ==
Boris Nuraliev - one of the founder of 1C Company. Yuri Ayzenshpis - Russian entertainment promoter. Puntsagiin Jasrai - former Mongolian prime minister. Artemy Troitsky - Russian journalist. Dmitry Kharatyan - famous Russian actor, got his second diploma in finance and investment in 2004.
