= Ovidius University of Constanța =

Romanian public higher education institution

Coordinates: 44.194421°N 28.650645°E

- Universitatea „Ovidius" din Constanța
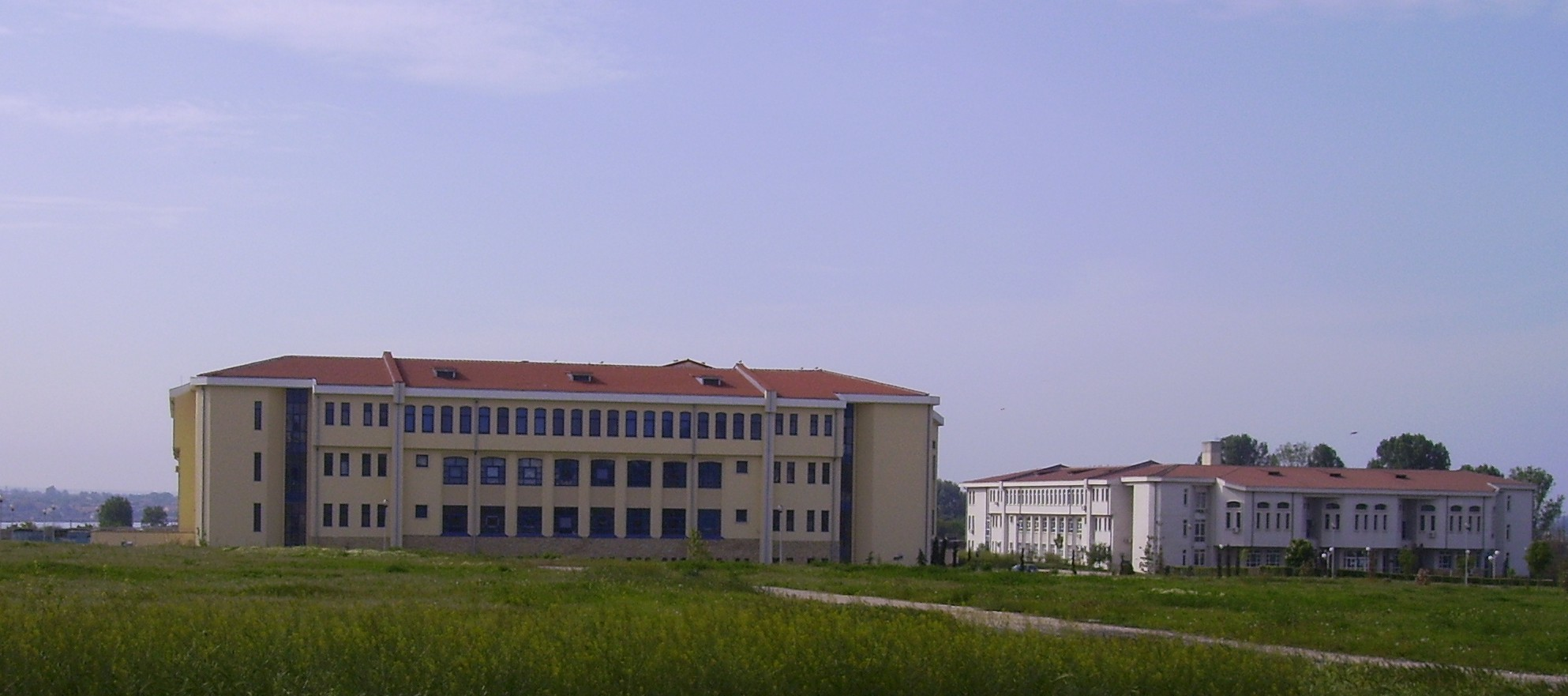
- The campus of Ovidius University
- Type: Public
- Established: 1990; 1961 – Pedagogical Institute
- Rector: Dan-Marcel Iliescu
- Students: about 15,000
- Location: Constanța, Romania
- Website: www.univ-ovidius.ro

University rankings

Regional – Overall
- QS Emerging Europe and Central Asia: 401-450 (2022)

Ovidius University of Constanța (Romanian: Universitatea „Ovidius" din Constanța) is a public higher education institution in Constanța, Romania founded in 1961 as a Pedagogical Institute and transformed into a comprehensive university in 1990. As the Charter of the university states, the Pedagogical Institute was founded by Order of the Ministry of Education no. 654 of 1961, comprising four faculties. By State Council Decree no. 209 of 1977 the institute became a Higher Education Institute and reorganized. By Government Decision 209 of 1990 the institute became a university and, a year later, by Order of the Ministry of Education and Science no. 4894 of 1991, the university was given the present name. The university is notable for having Romanian singer Inna as one of its alumni.

The university is named after the famous Roman poet Ovid (Publius Ovidius Naso), who spent the later years of his life in the ancient Greek colony of Tomis, the ancient name for Constanța, about 2,000 years ago.

The university has two main campuses, both located in Constanța. The central campus, hosting the headquarters of the university and the faculties of sciences and engineering, is located at 124 Mamaia Boulevard, whereas the north campus is located at 1 University Alley, hosting the faculties of humanities and theology, social sciences, life and medical sciences.

Ovidius University is a member of the European University Association (EUA), the European Association of Institutions in Higher Education (EURASHE), and the Agence universitaire de la Francophonie (AUF, Francophone University Association). It is a member of the Black Sea Universities Network (BSUN) and of the Balkan Universities Network (BUA) and it hosts the permanent general secretariat of BSUN.

== History ==
=== 1961 to 1989 ===
As the Charter of the university states, in 1961 the Pedagogical Institute was founded by Order of the Ministry of Education no. 654. The order was signed by Academician Ilie G. Murgulescu, the Minister of Education and Culture, at the time. The institute consisted of four faculties:

- Faculty of Letters (with majors in Romanian language and literature)
- Faculty of Mathematics (major in Mathematics)
- Faculty of Physics and Chemistry (major in Physics & Chemistry as well as in applied sciences)
- Faculty of Natural Sciences (major in natural sciences and in agriculture).

The institute started in 1961 with 198 students and 31 academic staff. Over time, an additional program in History and Geography was set up.

By State Council Decree no. 209 of 1977 the institute became a Higher Education Institute and was reorganized. At the time, due to a strong emphasis on engineering, some of the science majors were discontinued and new programs of study were set up, including welding engineering, hydrotechnical engineering and petroleum technology and petrochemistry. In 1984 the institute was reorganized to award only engineering degrees.

=== 1990 to present ===
By Government Decision 225 of 1990, signed by Prime Minister Petre Roman, the institute became in March 1990 a comprehensive university, named University of Constanța. One year later, by Order of the Ministry of Education and Science no. 4894 of 1991, the university took its present name, honoring Ovid, the Roman poet who was exiled in Tomis. Since 1990, Ovidius University of Constanța has witnessed a period of growth; it consists today of 16 faculties.

== Campuses ==
Ovidius University is located in the city of Constanța, Romania. The university's buildings are spread over the city, with usable area (lecture halls, seminar rooms, laboratories and reading rooms) totaling over 24,000 square metres (260,000 square feet)

=== Main buildings ===
The central (old) campus which hosts the Rector's office and the Administrative Board meeting room is located at 124 Mamaia Boulevard. Aside from the headquarters of the university the campus includes lecture halls and classrooms for the Faculties of Mathematics and Computer Science, Applied Sciences, Engineering, Arts, etc. Nearby, civil engineers conduct their activity at 27 Unirii Street, whereas psychologists and economists teach at 58 Ion Vodă Street. Next to the headquarters is the main university library, located at 126 Mamaia Boulevard.

The more recent north campus is situated at 1 University Alley, next to the Mamaia Lake and the summer resort of Mamaia. Building A, completed in 1998, hosts the Senate Hall and classrooms used by Philology, Economics, Law, History and Theology students. Building B, built in 2008, is meant for Medicine and Life sciences, whereas the nearby Building C hosts Pharmacy and Dentistry students. Other spaces belonging to the Faculty of Dentistry are situated downtown at 58 Ilarie Voronca Street, in a building refurbished in 2002.

== Organisation and administration ==
According to its Charter, Ovidius University is governed by two formal bodies: the Administrative Board, responsible for day-to-day operations, and the Senate, which is the supreme decision-making body, in charge of establishing the regulatory framework of the university. The university is led by the rector, who is the legal representative of the institution and the president of the Administrative Board, assisted by five vice-rectors. The activities of the Senate are led by the president of the Senate, assisted by a vice-president. Faculties are managed by deans, the collegiate decision-making bodies being the faculty councils.

Presently, Ovidius University consists of 16 faculties:

- Faculty of Letters
- Faculty of Theology
- Faculty of History and Political Sciences
- Faculty of Law and Administrative Sciences
- Faculty of Natural Sciences
- Faculty of Physical Education and Sport
- Faculty of Applied Sciences and Engineering
- Faculty of Mathematics and Informatics
- Faculty of Economics
- Faculty of Medicine
- Faculty of Dental Medicine
- Faculty of Pharmacy
- Faculty of Mechanical, Industrial and Maritime Engineering
- Faculty of Constructions
- Faculty of Arts
- Faculty of Psychology and Education Sciences

== Degree programs ==
The university offers bachelor's degrees in over 80 programs, master's degrees in over 70 programs and doctoral degrees in 8 fields of specialization.

At the moment bachelor's programs in English are offered in Medicine and Computer Science as well as in Cultural Studies. Ovidius University of Constanța also offers Ph.D. programs in English, French or Romanian.

As of 2014, most of the over 1,100 international students come from Moldova, Israel, Turkey, Albania, the United Kingdom, North Macedonia, Morocco, India, Turkmenistan, South Africa, etc.

The international students who wish to pursue studies in programs whose teaching language is Romanian are asked to demonstrate their proficiency or to learn Romanian during a preparatory year. The candidates, who can formally prove that they have studied in Romanian for at least four years consecutively, do not need to pass the Romanian language test or to attend the preparatory year.

The number of students is about 15,000.

Following the elections held in May 2014, the new Rector of Ovidius University of Constanța is Professor Sorin Rugina, a physician specialized in infectious diseases and former general manager of the Constanța Clinical Hospital for Infectious Diseases. During the elections held in 2016 the mandate of Professor Rugina was renewed for a four-year term.

== Academic profile ==
=== Faculty of Medicine ===
The Faculty of Medicine was founded in 1990, under the name of Faculty of General Medicine, Dentistry and Pharmacy in 1990. Since 1993, the Faculty of Medicine began teaching English-language medical programs at all levels and specializations, both in undergraduate and postgraduate courses. Currently there are over 800 foreign students, of which more than 600 are enrolled in the program in English, about 200 studying in Romanian.

== Controversies ==
In July 2013, Rector Dănuț Epure Tiberius was arrested on charges of complicity to bribery, following a complaint. An undercover investigator, posing as a businessman, named "Constantin", contacted Tiberius Dănuţ Epure, in July 2013, telling him that he was ready to pay any amount for the admission of his daughter, Liliana, to the Faculty of Pharmacy. The rector then told him to be careful what he says because his practice is under surveillance. They met again on 11 July, exchanging the sum of 5,000 euros, but no agreement was reached, however, on the records there are data on other "transactions".
