= Pushkin Leningrad State University =

St. Petersburg university

Coordinates: 59.7397°N 30.3878°E

- Ленинградский государственный университет имени А.С. Пушкина
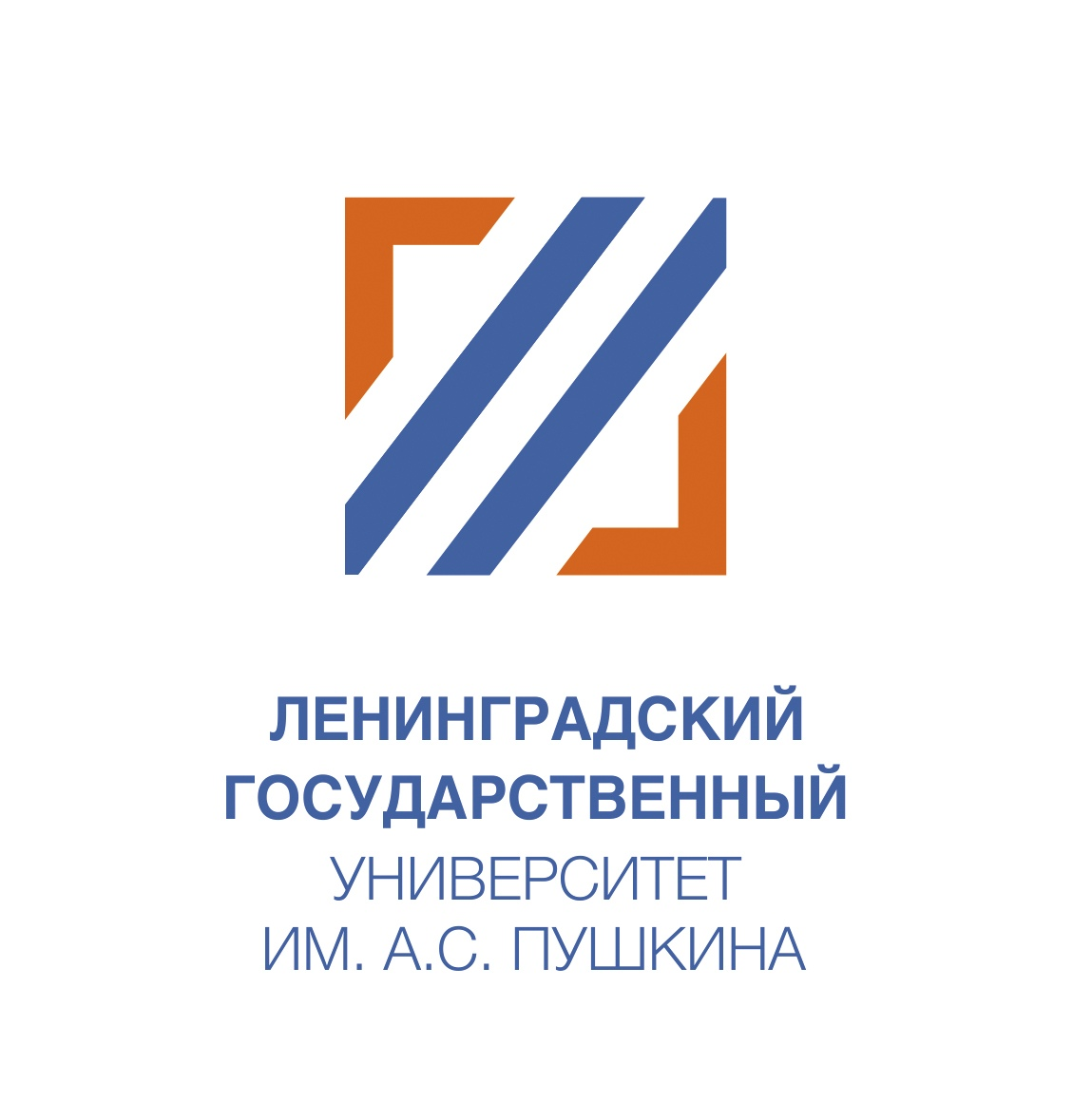
- Established: 1992
- Rector: Grigory Dvas
- Students: 15 thousand
- Location: Saint Petersburg, Russia
- Website: http://www.lengu.ru

Pushkin Leningrad State University (Russian: Ленинградский государственный университет имени А.С. Пушкина) is a university in Russia, located in Pushkin, Saint Petersburg. It was established in 1992 as Leningrad Oblast Pedagogical Institute. It provides training at all levels of post secondary education including bachelor degree, master's degree, PhD courses as well as vocational training and continuing education courses. In 1999 the university was given its current name after the Russian poet Alexander Pushkin.

It comprises the following Faculties:

- Faculty of Economics and Investment
- Faculty of Psychology
- Faculty of Philology
- Faculty of Special Education and Social Work
- Faculty of History and Social Science
- Faculty of Physical Education
- Faculty of Philosophy Culture Studies and Arts
- Faculty of Mathematics and Computer Studies
- Faculty of Law
- Faculty of Natural Science Geography and Tourism
- Faculty of Foreign Language

as well as 12 branches (institutes) and vocational college
