= COMVEST =

Educational institution in Brazil

Permanent Commission for Entrance Exams at Unicamp
- Comissão Permanente para os Vestibulares da Unicamp
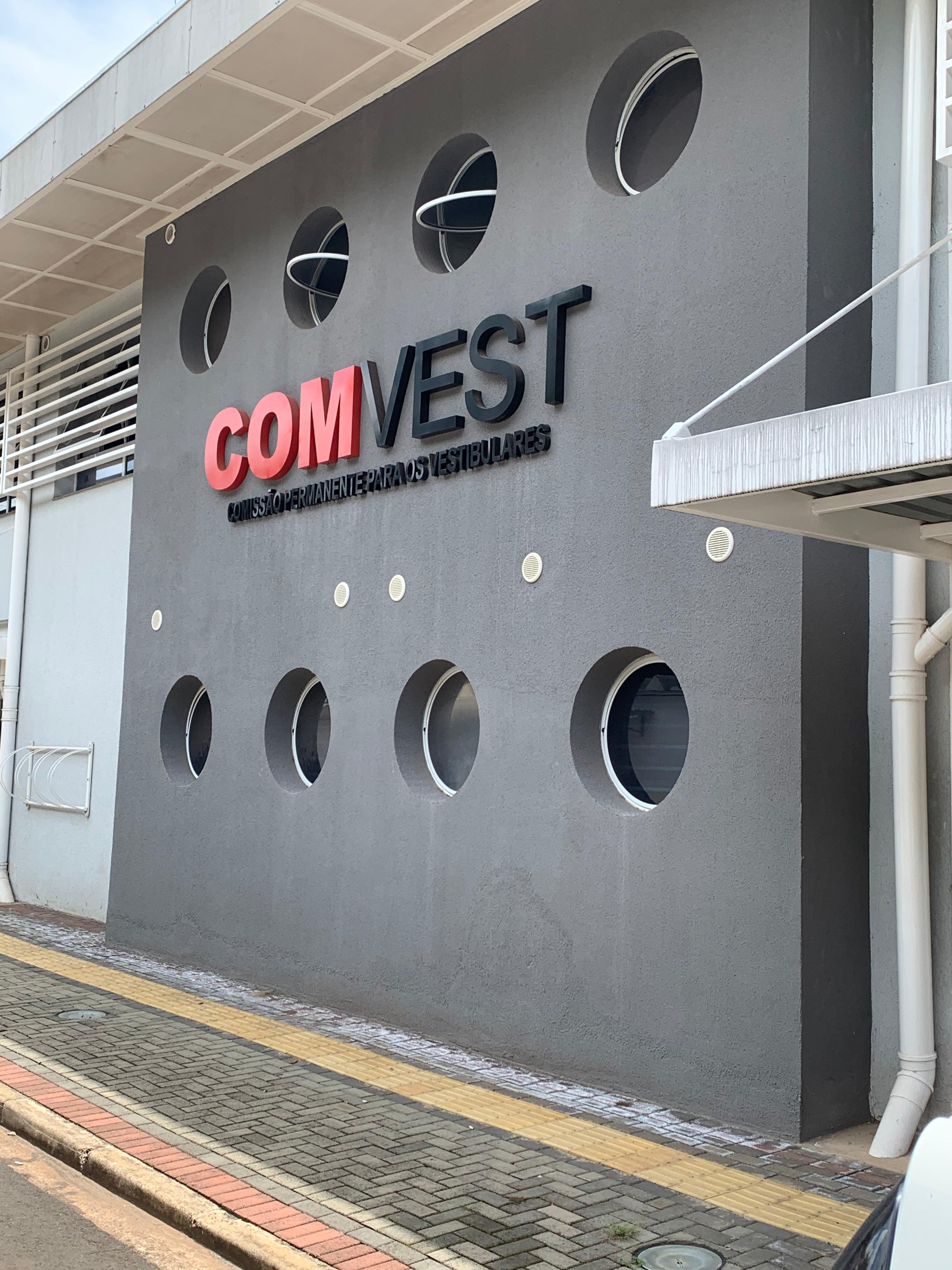
- Abbreviation: Comvest
- Formation: 1986; 40 years ago
- Founded at: Campinas, São Paulo
- Type: Public organization
- Headquarters: Campinas, São Paulo, Brazil
- Executive Director: José Alves de Freitas Neto
- Parent organization: State University of Campinas
- Affiliations: State University of Campinas
- Website: www.comvest.unicamp.br

The Permanent Commission for Entrance Exams at Unicamp (from Portuguese: Comissão Permanente para os Vestibulares da Unicamp), better known by its acronym Comvest, is a body of the State University of Campinas (Unicamp), founded in 1986 in Campinas, in the interior of the state of São Paulo, whose main objective is to conduct entrance exams for admission to that institution.

Comvest organizes Unicamp's entrance exam, selection processes for undergraduate admission, and medical residency processes. Its main event, Unicamp's entrance exam, is held in two phases and is the fourth largest entrance exam in the country in terms of number of applicants.

== History ==
With the process of redemocratization in Brazil, following more than two decades of military dictatorship, the State University of Campinas (Unicamp) envisioned a broader process of institutionalization, which involved establishing its own vestibular exam to select students whose profile aligned with that of the university during this new era of political openness in the country. This new phase of institutionalization spanned the administrations of two rectors, José Aristodemo Pinotti, and was completed during the administration of Paulo Renato Souza.

In pursuit of this goal, Unicamp severed ties with the University Foundation for Vestibular (FUVEST) and established the Permanent Commission for Unicamp Entrance Exams at Unicamp (Comvest) in 1986, which had already organized the 1987 entrance exam, with the aim of promoting an entrance exam that would select students with the following profile:

- able to express themselves clearly;
- able to organize ideas;
- able to make connections;
- able to interpret data and facts;
- able to formulate hypotheses and demonstrate mastery of the content of the core high school curriculum

To achieve this goal, the first college entrance exam consisted of:

- entirely essay-based exams, as opposed to multiple-choice tests;
- a first phase consisting of an essay worth 50 points (out of 80) and 12 general questions (physics, chemistry, mathematics, biology, history, and geography);
- a minimum score of 5.0 as the threshold for candidates to advance from the first to the second phase, unlike the previous system administered by Fuvest, which qualified candidates for the second phase based on the number of openings in each program (three times the number of openings);
- the second phase is also entirely essay-based, with 16 questions from each of the core high school subjects (history, geography, mathematics, physics, chemistry, and biology);
- the score from the first phase would be included in the calculation of the final result, with a weight of 2 (i.e., worth twice as much).

In the 2000s, it expanded to incorporate inclusion policies, such as the Affirmative Action and Social Inclusion Program (PAAIS) in 2004. In 2011, it launched the Interdisciplinary Higher Education Program (ProFIS), a program aimed at students who attended public high schools in the city of Campinas, in which incoming students undergo a foundational course at the university, taking courses in the humanities, biological sciences, exact sciences, and technology before choosing a degree program.

In 2017, under the leadership of Edmundo Capelas de Oliveira and during the tenure of Rector José Tadeu Jorge, the cornerstone of the Comvest building—designed to cover 2,617 square meters—was laid during a ceremony. Two years later, under the administration of Rector Marcelo Knobel and Director José Alves de Freitas Neto, this space granted Comvest greater autonomy in organizing its activities, as well as eliminating the additional costs previously incurred from renting external venues for grading exams.

=== Inclusion policies and quotas ===
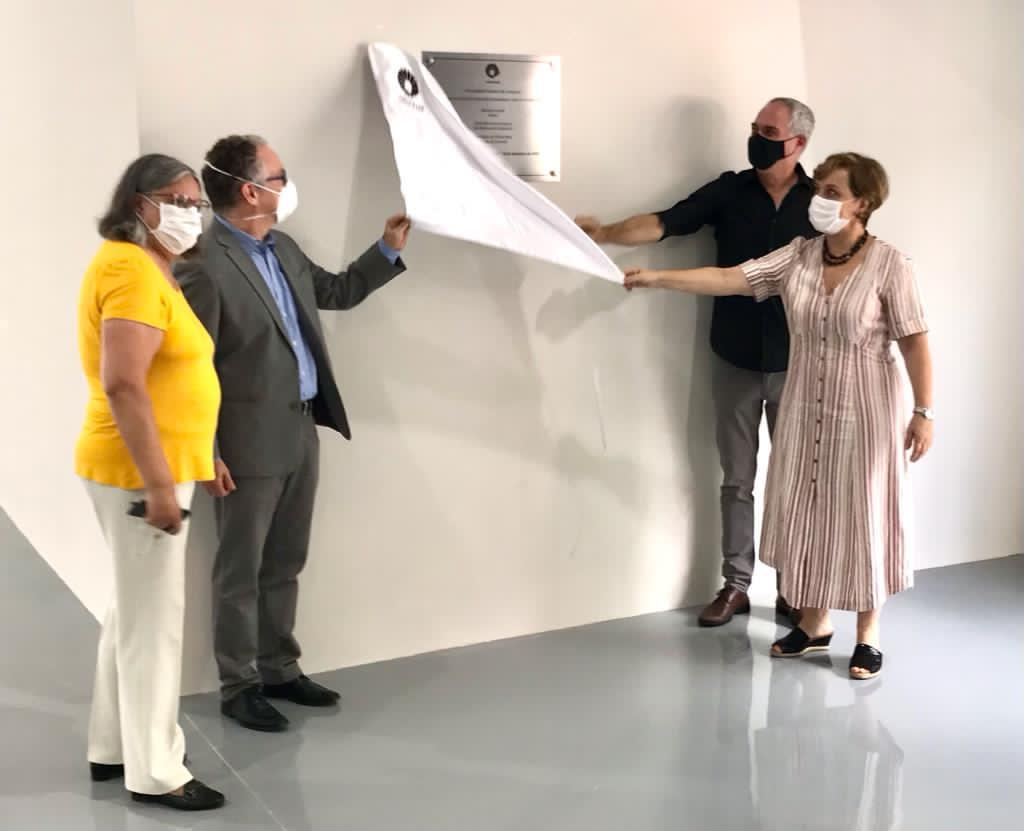
Inauguration ceremony for the Comvest building

The university adopted racial quotas in 2017 for afro-Brazilians, pardos, and Indigenous students, reserving 25% of its spots for them. Also in 2017, the university adopted the National High School Exam (ENEM) as one of the admission pathways, while also allowing students who had won Olympic medals to secure spots in higher education programs. In 2018, the first indigenous entrance exam was held, attracting more than 600 students and offering 72 spots in various programs.

The committee also adapted to crises, such as the COVID-19 pandemic in 2020–2021, when it continued to administer exams to ensure the continuity of the admissions process, while implementing health measures to prevent the spread of COVID-19. In 2024, the university approved quotas for people with disabilities. In 2025, it approved quotas for transgender, transvestite, and non-binary individuals, expanding the scope of diversity.

== Contemporaneity ==
Currently, Comvest is responsible for the fourth-largest college entrance exam in the country, specifically the Unicamp entrance exam. The exam is administered in thirty-one cities in the interior of the state of São Paulo and in six Brazilian state capitals.

The exam is administered in two phases and consists of 72 multiple-choice questions, each with four options and worth one point. Candidates who meet the cutoff score proceed to the second phase, which takes place over two days. On the first day, the exam consists of an essay and six questions on Portuguese language and literature, as well as four interdisciplinary questions (natural sciences and English language). The second day is dedicated to the assessment of specific subjects, which vary depending on the course chosen by the candidate, answered in essay form. Each course requires three specific subjects, selected from the following areas of knowledge: mathematics, physics, chemistry, biology, history, geography, sociology, and philosophy, comprising 18 questions.

== Directors ==
Period	Director	Institute	Ref.
1986—1996	Jocimar Archangelo	(Note: With a degree in philosophy from the University of São Paulo (USP), Jocimar was the director of the Equipe college prep course, located in the city of São Paulo, and was chosen by Paulo Renato to be the first director of Comvest.)	
1996—1998	Paulo Sérgio Franco Barbosa	School of Civil Engineering, Architecture and Urbanism	
1998—2002	Bernadete Abaurre	Institute of Language Studies	
2002—2009	Leandro Russoviski Tessler	Institute of Physics Gleb Wataghin	
2009—2011	Renato Hyuda de Luna Pedrosa	Instituto de Geociências	
2011—2013	Maurício Urban Kleinke	Institute of Physics Gleb Wataghin	
2013—2017	Edmundo Capelas de Oliveira	Institute of Mathematics, Statistics and Scientific Computing	
2017—presente	José Alves de Freitas Neto	Institute of Philosophy and Human Sciences	
