= Jorge Stolfi =

Brazilian software programmer

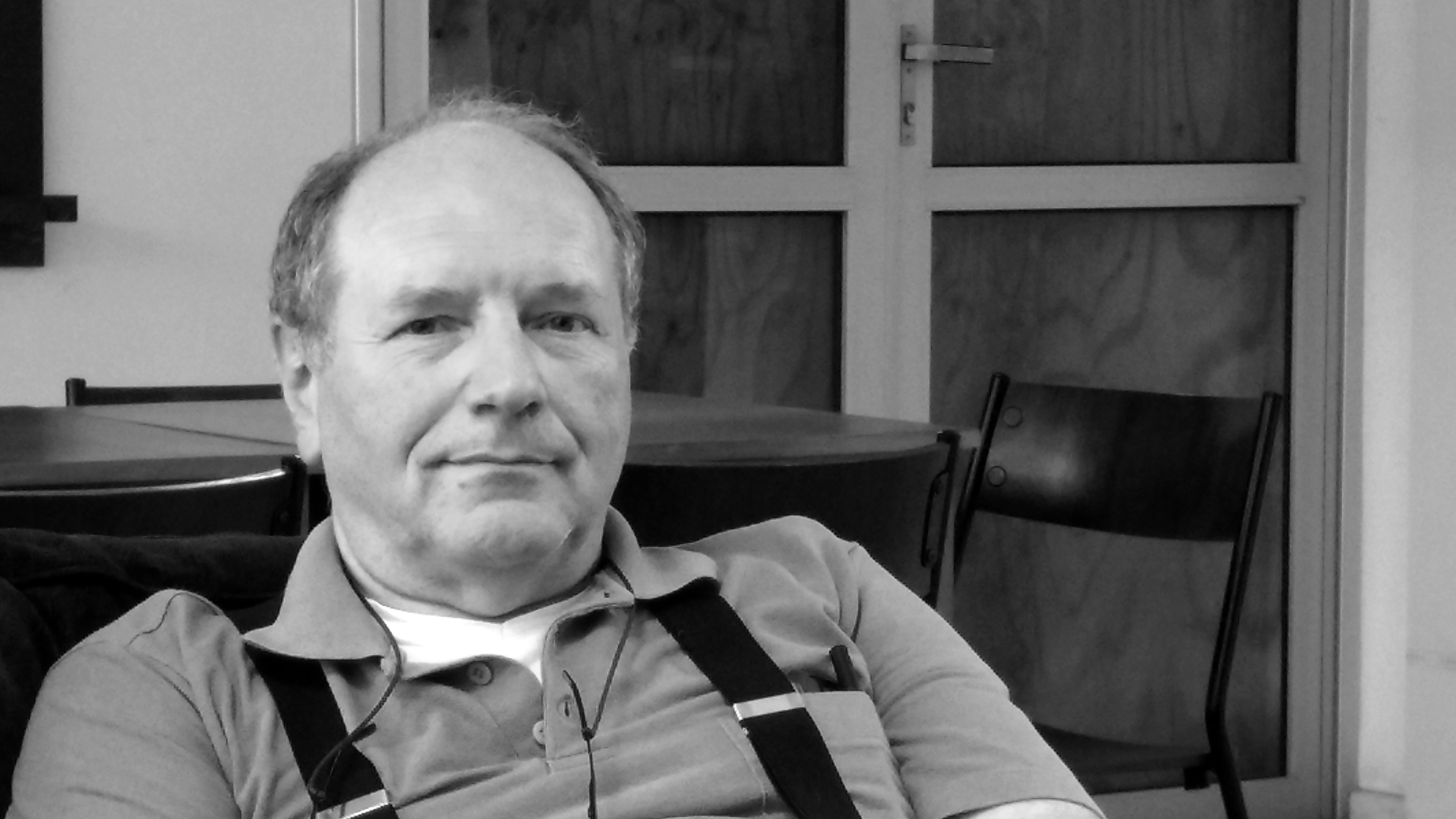
Jorge Stolfi

Jorge Stolfi (born 1950 in São Paulo) is a full professor of computer science at the State University of Campinas, working in computer vision, image processing, splines and other function approximation methods, graph theory, computational geometry and several other fields. According to the ISI Web Of Science, as of 2010 he was the most highly cited computer scientist in Brazil. Outside of academia, Stolfi has accrued an online following due to his skepticism and comments on Bitcoin.

== Early life and career ==
Jorge Stolfi was born in Vila Carrão, a suburb of São Paulo. His parents had immigrated to Brazil from the Veneto region of Italy only two years earlier, and so he spoke Venetian as his first language. He obtained an engineering degree in electronics (1973) and M.Sc. in applied mathematics (1979) from the University of São Paulo. From 1979 to 1988 he was a student of Leo Guibas at Stanford University, where he got a Ph.D in computer science. His PhD was funded by a CNPq grant from 1979 to 1983, then a research internship at Xerox PARC until 1985, and at the DEC Systems Research Center (SRC) until 1988. After obtaining his Ph.D. he became a research engineer at SRC.

In 1992 he returned to Brazil to take a position at the Computer Science Department of the University of Campinas (UNICAMP), which later became the university's Institute of Computing. He was the institute's chairman from 2004 to 2008.

== Research ==
While at Stanford, Leo Guibas and Jorge worked on the then-new field of computational geometry. Among other results they developed the quad-edge data structure for two-dimensional maps, the kinetic framework for computational geometry. Jorge's Ph.D. dissertation on oriented projective geometry was later published as a book. He also drew dozens of cartoons for the DEC SRC technical reports.

In 1992 Jorge collected and widely disseminated (through the historic DEC gatekeeper ftp archives and Prime Time Freeware) a set of wordlists that later formed the basis of the ispell resources (later myspell, currently part of OpenOffice.org and Mozilla as hunspell).

After moving to UNICAMP, Jorge developed affine arithmetic, a model for self-validated computation (which he had conceived in 1991), in collaboration with Marcus Andrade, João Comba, and Luiz Figueiredo.

At UNICAMP Jorge also worked with C. Lucchesi and T.Kowaltowski on finite state transducer technology for spell checking and other natural language processing tasks. With his student H. Leitão he developed an efficient algorithm for pottery fragment reassembly by multiscale outline matching, and analyzed the density of useful information contained in those outlines. He has also contributed to the study of the Voynich manuscript.

Since 2001 Jorge has been involved in efforts to raise public and government awareness about the insecurity of Brazilian electronic voting machines, which are of the direct recording electronic (DRE) type and therefore vulnerable to massive and undetectable software-based vote-stealing.

== Bitcoin skepticism ==
Starting late 2013, Jorge took an active interest in the economics of cryptocurrencies. He became skeptical about its underlying soundness and chances of success and has been advising the Brazilian public against investment in bitcoin. In 2016 he submitted a letter to the SEC outlining what he perceives as similarities between Bitcoin and penny stocks or Ponzi schemes. In response, another person by the name of Colin Baird wrote the SEC to cast doubt on Stolfi's letters, without addressing any of Stolfi's arguments.

In 2021, Stolfi wrote a paper titled "Bitcoin is a Ponzi", in which he summarized the main characteristics of a Ponzi scheme, and its similarities with Bitcoin. The paper went viral after it was posted on HackerNews, a website frequented by computer programmers, where it received over 500 upvotes.

In 2022, after posting to Twitter that "blockchain technology is a fraud", he inspired 1500 experts to write a letter to US Congress about the risks of cryptocurrencies.
