= Tom Zé (engineer) =

Brazilian food engineer and researcher

Antônio Meirelles
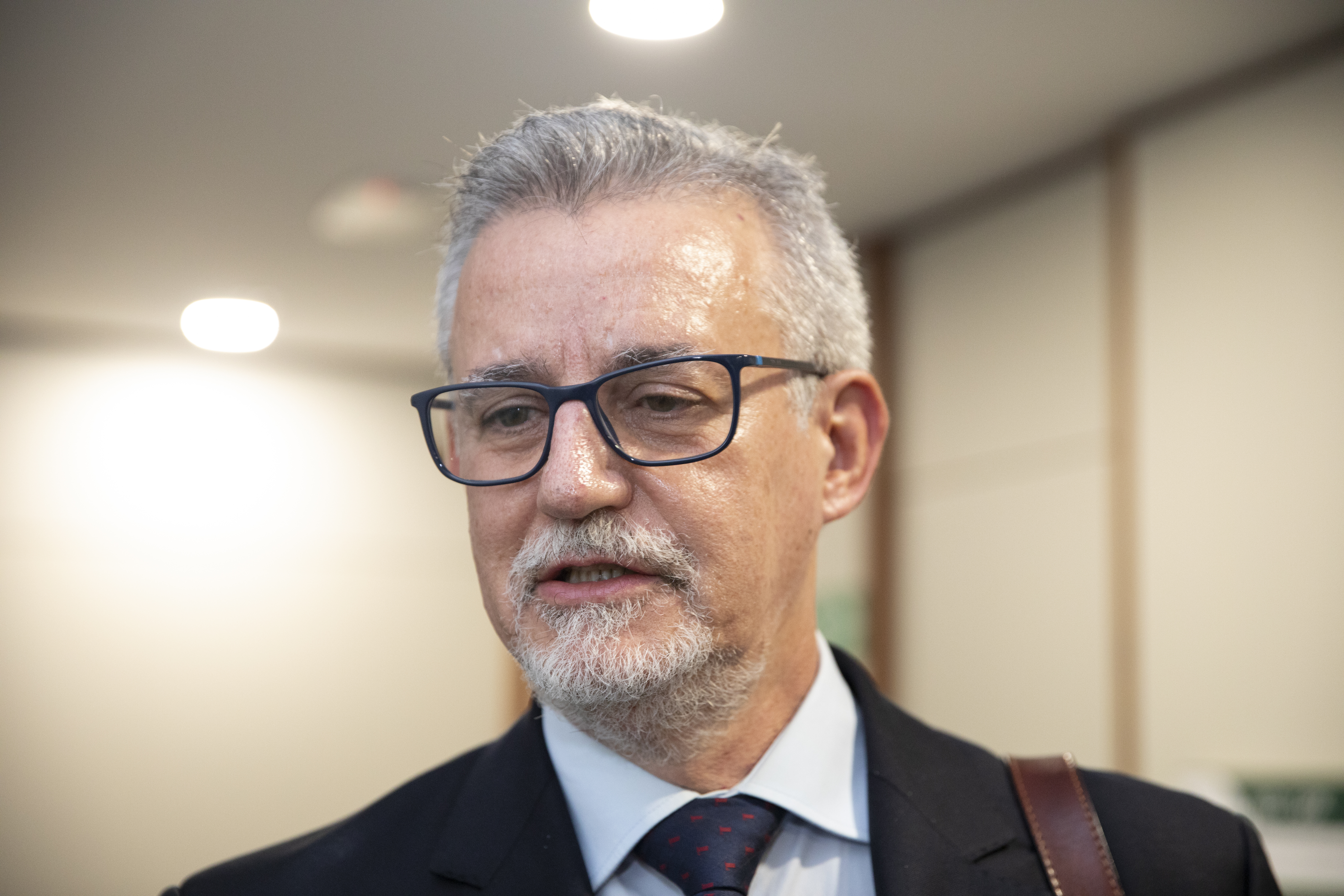
- Tom Zé in 2023
- Born: Antônio José de Almeida Meirelles; 1958 (age 67–68); Campinas, São Paulo, Brazil
- Other name: Tom Zé
- Education: State University of Campinas
- Occupations: Food Engineer; University Professor; Rector of Unicamp
- Employer: State University of Campinas
- Awards: Jabuti Award for Engineering, Technology, and Information Technology (2016)

Antônio José de Almeida Meirelles (1958), commonly known as Tom Zé, is a Brazilian engineer and full professor at the Faculty of Food Engineering (FEA) of the State University of Campinas. He served as the University's 13th rector from April 2021 to April 2025.

== Biography ==
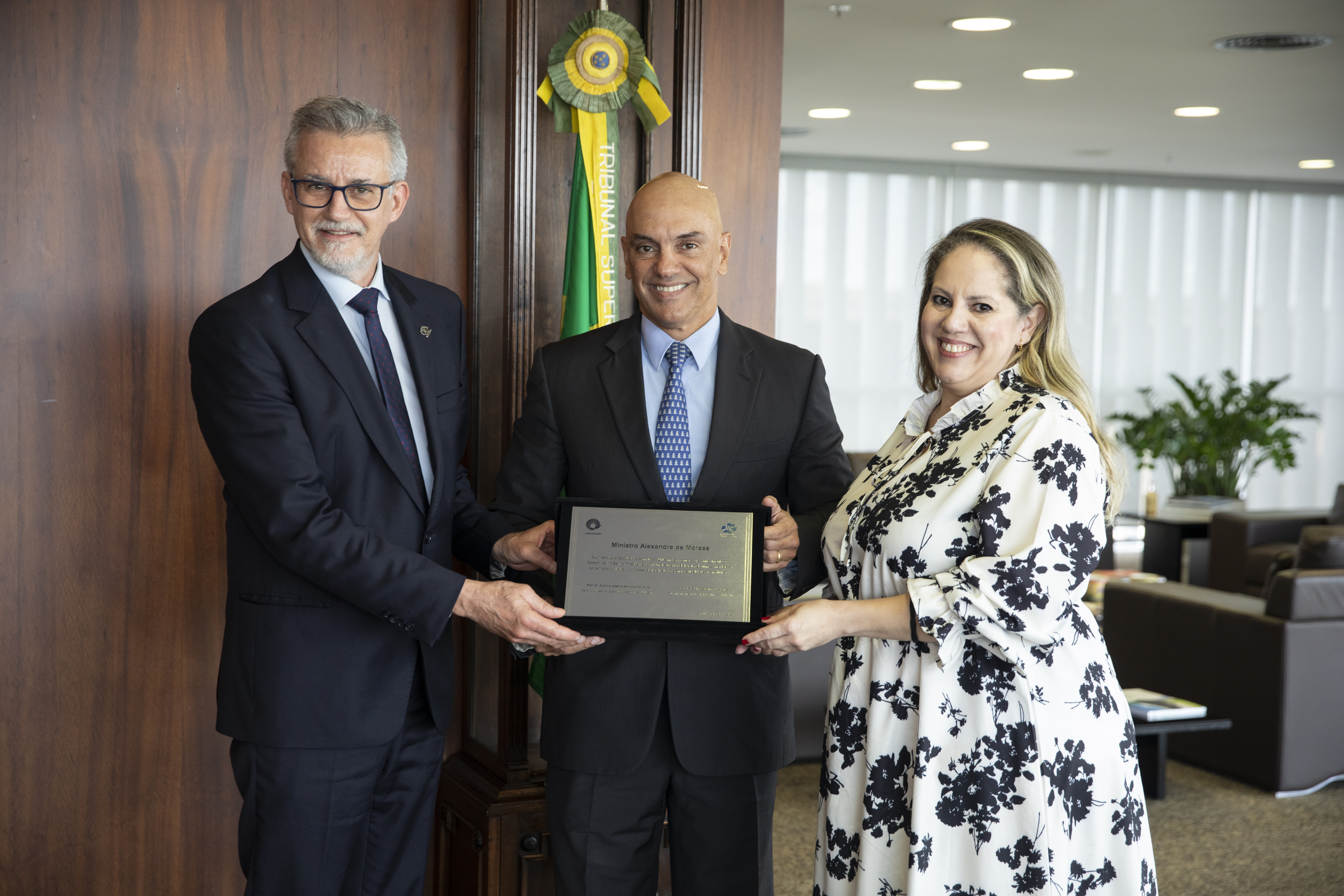
Tom Zé with Alexandre de Moraes in tribute awarded by Unicamp.

Born in Campinas, city in the interior of the state of São Paulo, he entered the State University of Campinas (Unicamp) in 1976. He graduated in 1980 with a degree in food engineering. He obtained his master's degree from the same institution in 1984, studying the drying of sugarcane bagasse.

He moved to Germany to study for his doctorate. He studied thermal process engineering at Martin Luther University Halle-Wittenberg, where he obtained his doctorate in 1987. The technology developed as part of his PhD abroad earned him the 1989 Young Scientist Award, granted by the National Council for Scientific and Technological Development (CNPq), and is currently responsible for about 30% of Brazil's anhydrous alcohol production. In 1995, he achieved the position of associate professor at Unicamp. He completed a second doctorate at the University of Campinas Institute of Economics in 1997, in a study that sought to examine the compatibility of John Maynard Keynes' monetary production theory with the "horizontalist" approach to determining interest rates and money supply.

His research in engineering focuses on bioenergy, biorefineries, and purification processes for food and agroindustrial products.

In 2016, he was awarded the Jabuti Prize, which he wrote with researchers Pedro de Alcântara Pessoa Filho, Vânia Regina Nicoletti, and Carmen Cecilia Tadini for the book Operações Unitárias na Indústria de Alimentos in the Engineering, Technology, and Information Technology category.

Tom Zé took office as the 13th rector in Unicamp's history on April 19, 2021, for a term ending in December 2024, after winning the academic consultation and having his name confirmed by the University Council (Consu) and the then governor of São Paulo, João Doria (PSDB). In his first speech, Tom Zé highlighted as priorities the strengthening of actions against COVID-19 pandemic, bringing the university closer to the demands and needs of society, and promoting the appreciation of university professors and staff. During his tenure, the institution signed international agreements, invested in climate change measures, awarded an honorary doctorate to the group Racionais MC's, and approved quotas for transgender and for people with disabilities. He remained rector of the university until April 2025. His successor is physical education professor Paulo César Montagner.
