= University of Campinas Institute of Computing =

Computer science department, Brazil

Coordinates: 22.8145°S 47.0643°W

The Institute of Computing (Portuguese: Instituto de Computação), formerly the Department of Computer Science at the Institute of Mathematics, Statistics and Computer Science, is the main unit of education and research in computer science at the State University of Campinas (Unicamp). The institute is located at the Zeferino Vaz campus, in the district of Barão Geraldo in Campinas, São Paulo, Brazil.

== History ==
The origins of the Institute traces back to 1969 when Unicamp created a baccalaureate in Computer Science. The first one of its kind in Brazil, it served as a model for many computing courses in other universities in the country. In the same year, the Department of Computer Science (DCC) was established at the Institute of Mathematics, Statistics and Computer Science (IMECC). In March 1996, the department was separated from IMECC and became a full institute, the 20th academic unit of Unicamp. The reorganization was completed formally when its first dean came to office in the next year (March 1997).

== Courses ==
The institute offers two undergraduate courses: a baccalaureate in Computer Science (evening period) and another in Computer Engineering (in partnership with the School of Electric and Computer Engineering). The institute offers also graduate programs at the level of master's and doctorate in Computer Science. These courses have received top evaluations from the ministry of education, and attract students from many Latin America countries. The institute also offers many post-graduate specialization and continued education directed mainly towards the qualification and specialization of information technology professionals.

== Departments ==
The IC is organized into three departments:

- DSC - Department of Computer Systems
- DSI - Department of Information Systems
- DTC - Department of Computer Theory

== See also ==
- University of Campinas
- School of Electrical and Computer Engineering (Campinas)
- Jorge Stolfi
- Nina da Hora
