= Nina da Hora =

Afro-Brazilian activist

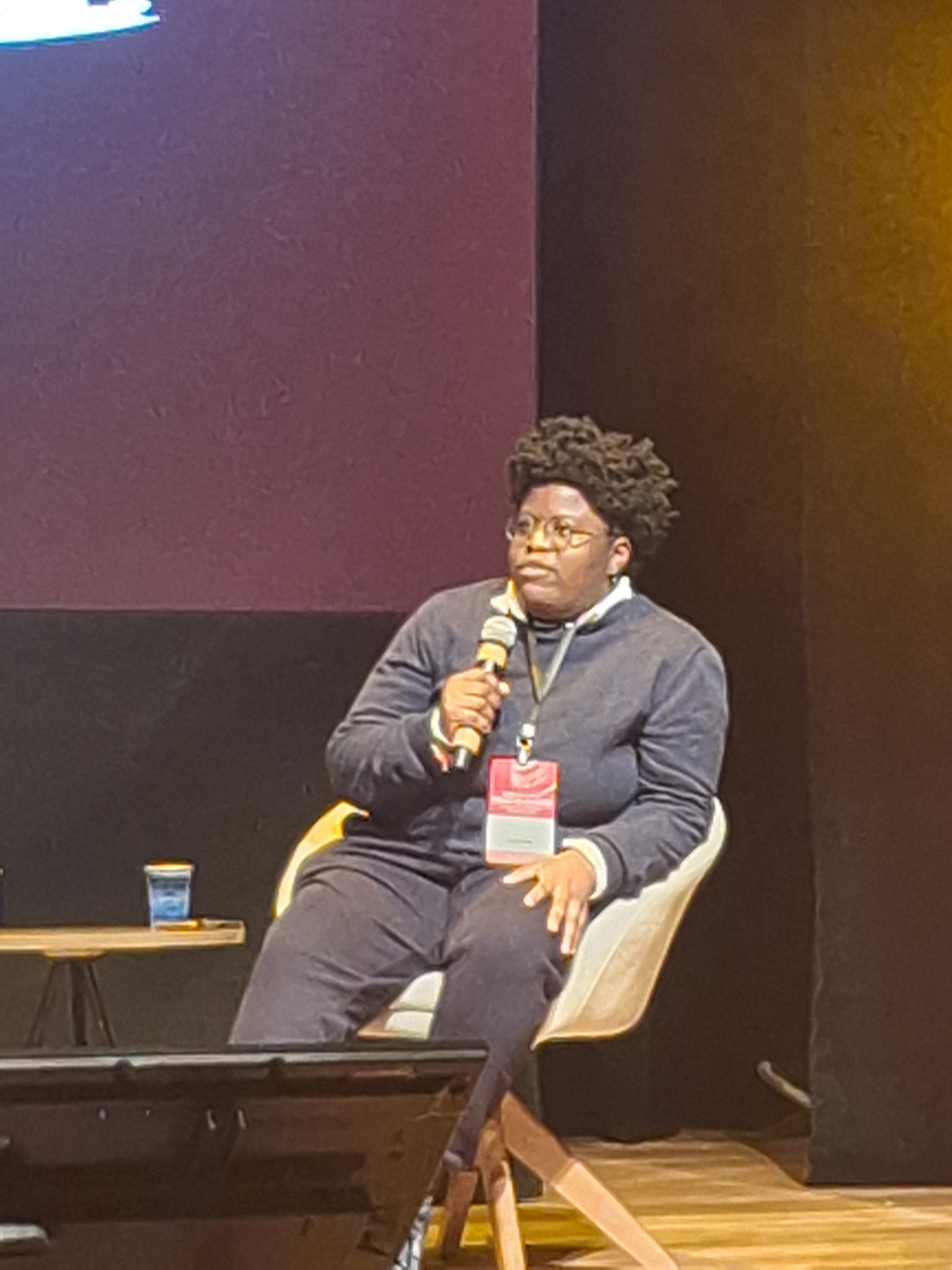
- Nina in 2026
- Born: 1995 (age 30–31)
- Education: Pontifical Catholic University of Rio de Janeiro; State University of Campinas
- Occupations: Computer scientist, activist

Nina da Hora (born 1995) is an Afro-Brazilian activist and computer scientist known for her research on artificial intelligence ethics, computer vision, facial recognition technologies and digital rights, and for her efforts to increase women's participation in technological development. She is a researcher at the Center for Technology and Society at Fundação Getúlio Vargas (CTS/FGV) and the founder of Instituto da Hora, a non-profit research organization dedicated to digital rights in Brazil.

She is the author of the concept of computational epistemicide (Portuguese: epistemicídio computacional), a theoretical framework developed in her master's research that describes the technical-scale erasure of ways of knowing and existing through the design of automated systems.

== Education ==
Hora earned her bachelor's degree in Computer Science at the Pontifical Catholic University of Rio de Janeiro and a master's degree in Computer Science at the State University of Campinas (UNICAMP), with research developed at the Recod.Ai laboratory on bias mitigation in computer vision systems.

== Research ==
Hora's research focuses on the ethics of algorithms and artificial intelligence, with particular attention to computer vision, facial recognition technologies, cybersecurity and the political economy of automated systems.

In her master's work and subsequent publications, she developed the concept of computational epistemicide to describe how automated systems do not merely reproduce social inequalities but actively erase entire epistemologies through the design of data collection, modelling, optimisation metrics and computational infrastructure. According to her formulation, computational epistemicide operates across four interrelated layers: data collection and ontology; modelling and representation; metrics and optimisation; and governance and infrastructure.

In the essay Imagens que a máquina lê, mundos que ela apaga ("Images the machine reads, worlds it erases"), published in Arcos Design, she extends the concept to image regimes, analysing training, operational and platform images in contrast with socialised forms of image circulation as evidence, memory and counter-narrative.

In collaboration with anthropologist Marisol Marini and computer scientist Sandra Avila, she co-authored "Recognition under Suspicion: Alliances Between Anthropology and Computer Science to Confront the Understanding of Ethics in the Development of Facial Recognition", published in the dossier Inteligência artificial em perspectiva crítica of the journal GIS – Gesture, Image and Sound. The article proposes an interdisciplinary dialogue between anthropology and computer science to interrogate the ethics of facial recognition systems.

== Career ==
Hora is the founder of Instituto da Hora, a non-profit research organization led by Black and Indigenous women, focused on digital rights, digital sovereignty and internet governance in Brazil. The institute hosts the HoraLab, a laboratory dedicated to digital traceability.

She is a researcher at the Center for Technology and Society of the Fundação Getulio Vargas (CTS/FGV) and a regular columnist for MIT Technology Review Brasil. She has served as a consultant to the United Nations Development Programme (UNDP) and is a member of the Global Council on Responsible AI at Chatham House.

In Brazil, she is a member of the Council for Sustainable Economic and Social Development (CDESS) of the Presidency of the Republic, advising on technology and artificial intelligence. She served on the Electoral Transparency Commission of the Superior Electoral Court (TSE) for the 2022 Brazilian general election and is a member of TikTok Brazil Security Council Advisory Board. She is also a member of "Tire Meu Rosto Da Sua Mira" (Get My Face Out Of Your Sight), an anti-racist movement against the deployment of facial recognition software for public safety.

She is the creator of the YouTube channel Computação sem Caô and of the podcast Ogunhê, dedicated to the history of African scientists.

== Selected publications ==
- Marini, Marisol; da Hora, Nina; Avila, Sandra (2025). "Recognition under Suspicion: Alliances Between Anthropology and Computer Science to Confront the Understanding of Ethics in the Development of Facial Recognition". GIS – Gesture, Image and Sound 10 (1): e230902. doi:10.11606/issn.2525-3123.gis.2025.230902
- da Hora, Nina (2026). "Imagens que a máquina lê, mundos que ela apaga: notas sobre epistemicídio computacional". Arcos Design 19 (1). doi:10.12957/arcosdesign.2026.95285
- da Hora, Nina (2 September 2025). "Contra a métrica do mundo". Stanford Social Innovation Review Brasil, Special Issue – Possible Futures (AI).

== Recognition ==
In 2021, Hora appeared in Forbes Brazil "Under 30" list. In 2022, she received the Sabiá Award from the Cambridge University Brazilian Society and the Prêmio Nise da Silveira in the Technology category, awarded by the City of Rio de Janeiro. In 2024, she joined the Ford Global Fellowship at the Ford Foundation, a program that supports global leaders advancing innovative solutions to end inequality. She has also been named to the Powerlist 100 by Bantumen (2022) and to the 100 Brilliant Women in AI Ethics list (2020).
