= Murílio de Avellar Hingel =

Brazilian politician (1933–2023)

Minister of Education
- In office 1 October 1992 – 1 October 1995
- Preceded by: Eraldo Tinoco
- Succeeded by: Paulo Renato Souza

Personal details
- Born: 5 April 1933 Rio de Janeiro, Brazil
- Died: 4 October 2023 (aged 90) Romorantin-Lanthenay, France
- Party: Independent
- Education: Federal University of Juiz de Fora
- Occupation: Geographer

Murílio de Avellar Hingel (5 April 1933 – 4 October 2023) was a Brazilian geographer and politician. An independent, he served as Minister of Education from 1992 to 1995.

Hingel died in Romorantin-Lanthenay, France on 4 October 2023, during a family trip, at the age of 90.

== Biography ==
Descendent of Germans and Portuguese, he graduated in geography and history from the Faculty of Philosophy and Letters (FAFILE) of the Federal University of Juiz de Fora, which he directed during Brazil's military dictatorship.

He was Minister of Education in the Itamar Franco government from 1 October 1992 to 1 January 1995. In 1993, Hingel was admitted by President Itamar Franco to the Order of Military Merit at the rank of Special Grand Officer. He was awarded the title of honoris causa by the Federal University of Pelotas in 2008.
