= University of Campinas Institute of Biology =

Research and higher education institution in São Paulo, Brazil

Coordinates: 22.8195°S 47.0702°W

Instituto de Biologia da Universidade Estadual de Campinas
- Established: 1967
- Location: Campinas, Brazil
- Website: www.ib.unicamp.br
- Location within Brazil

The State University of Campinas Institute of Biology (Portuguese: Instituto de Biologia da Universidade Estadual de Campinas) is a research and higher education institution located at UNICAMP's main campus in the district of Barão Geraldo in Campinas, São Paulo, Brazil.

== Undergraduate programs ==
- Bachelor's Degree in Biological Sciences
- Teaching Degree in Biological Sciences

== Graduate programs ==
- Cellular and Structural Biology
- Veterinary Medicine
- Ecology
- Functional and Molecular Biology
- Genetics and Molecular Biology
- Plant Biology
- Parasitology

== Interdepartmental Complementary Units ==
- Herbarium
- Zoology Museum
- Electron Microscope Laboratory

== Address ==
Instituto de Biologia
Rua Monteiro Lobato - n° 255
Unicamp - Cidade Universitária Zeferino Vaz
Campinas - 13083-970
Brazil
