= University of Campinas Institute of Economics =

Educational Institute in Brazil

Coordinates: 22°48′53.80″S 47°03′57.13″W

Instituto de Economia
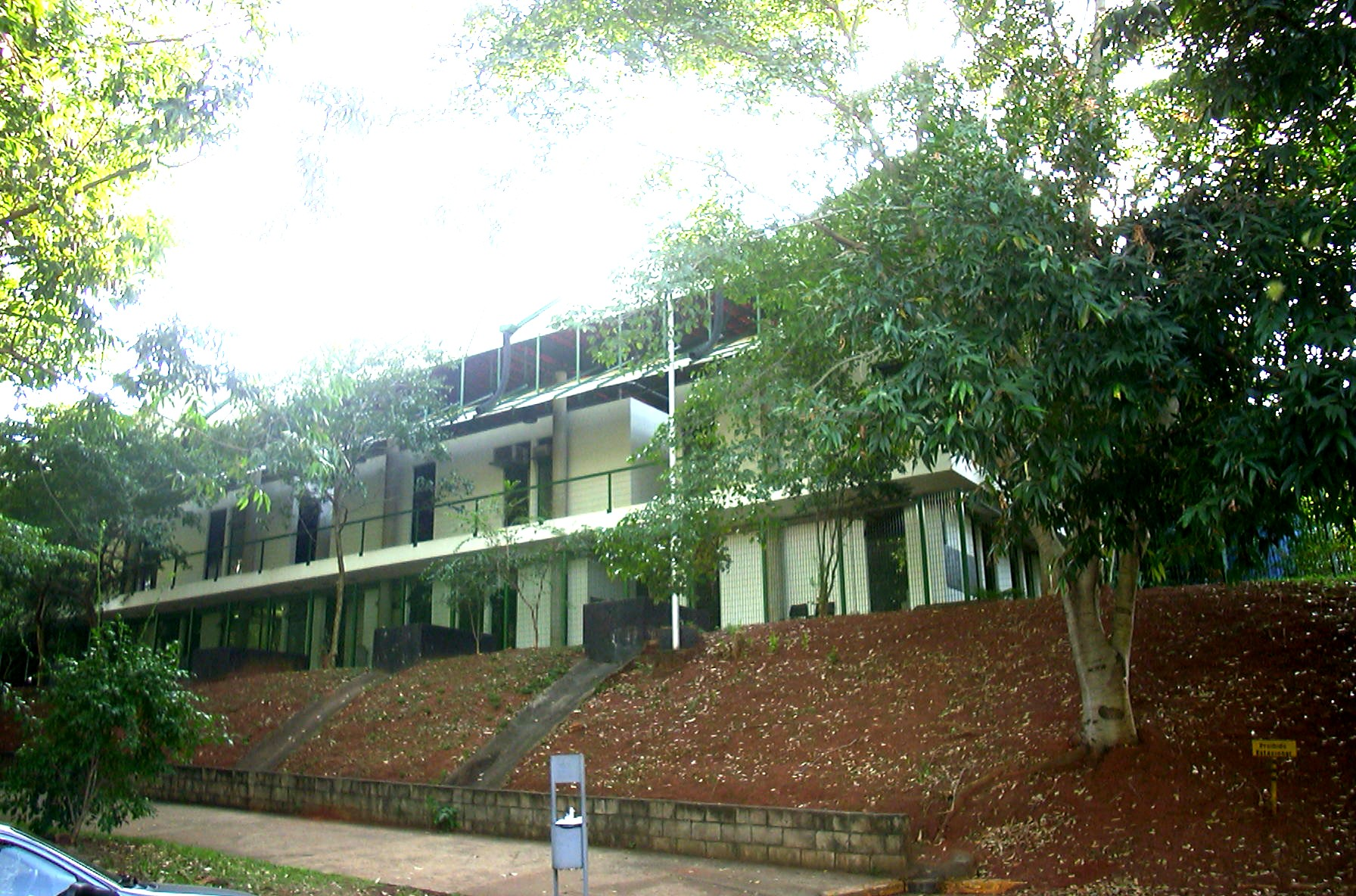
- Facade of the main building
- Former names: Department of Economics and Economic Planning (1968-1984)
- Type: Public
- Parent institution: State University of Campinas
- Dean: Célio Hiratuka
- Location: Campinas, São Paulo, Brazil
- Website: eco.unicamp.br

The Instituto de Economia da Universidade Estadual de Campinas is an academic unit of the State University of Campinas, located in the main campus of the University, in Barão Geraldo, Campinas, State of São Paulo, Brazil.

Originally created as a research group within the university's Institute of Philosophy and Human Sciences, it became an institute in its own right in 1984. Today, it is an important public policy think-tank in economics and related areas in Brazil.

It offers one undergraduate major in Economics (BSc in Economics), many specialization courses (in management, international relations and diplomacy, labour economics and banking), two Masters programs (Development Economics and Economic Theory) and one Ph.D. program.

== Alumni ==
- Celso Furtado - economist for the United Nations Economic Commission for Latin America and the Caribbean, development theorist
- José Serra - Governor of São Paulo
- Aloizio Mercadante - Senator for São Paulo
