= Paulo Renato Souza =

Brazilian economist and politician

Paulo Renato Costa Souza
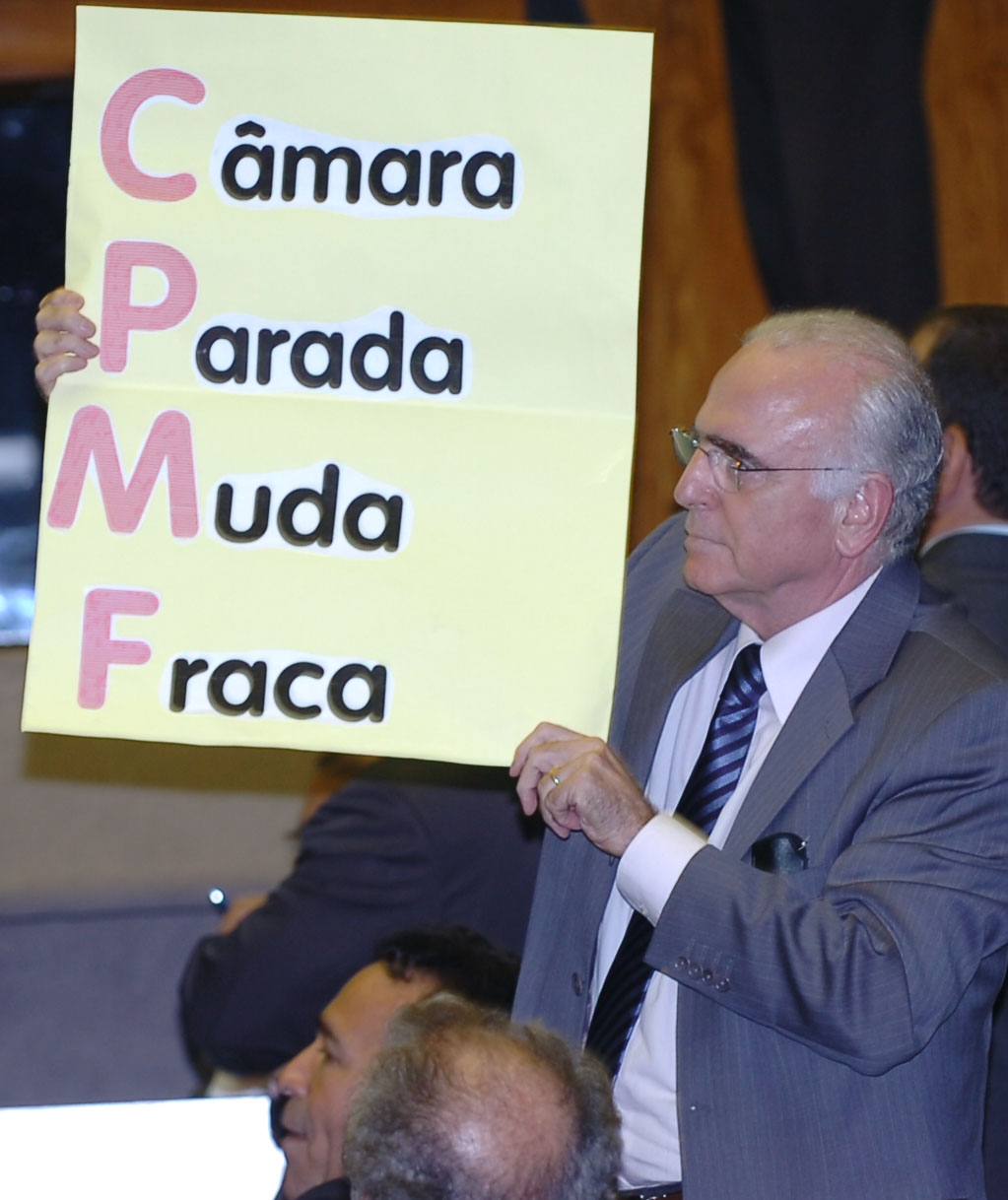

Minister of Education of Brazil
- In office 1 January 1995 – 31 December 2002
- Preceded by: Murílio de Avellar Hingel
- Succeeded by: Cristovam Buarque

Secretary of Education of São Paulo
- In office 27 March 2009 – 16 December 2010
- Preceded by: Maria Helena Guimarães de Castro
- Succeeded by: Fernando Padula

Rector of UNICAMP
- In office 1 January 1986 – 1 January 1990
- Preceded by: José Aristodemo Pinotti
- Succeeded by: Carlos Vogt

Personal details
- Born: 10 September 1945 Porto Alegre, Rio Grande do Sul, Brazil
- Died: 25 June 2011 (aged 65) São Roque, São Paulo, Brazil
- Political party: PSDB

Paulo Renato Costa Souza (10 September 1945 in Porto Alegre, Rio Grande do Sul – 25 June 2011 in São Roque, São Paulo) was a Brazilian economist and politician.

== Life ==
Souza took a degree in economics from Universidade Federal do Rio Grande do Sul in 1967 and received a master's degree from the University of Chile in 1970. He was the deputy director of the International Labour Organization's Regional Program for Employment in Latin America and the Caribbean from 1971 to 1974, he later worked as a consultant for a number of UN agencies active in Latin America. He completed his doctorate at Universidade Estadual de Campinas (UNICAMP) in 1980.

From 1984 to 1986, he was Secretary of Education of the State of São Paulo under Governor André Franco Montoro. He left the post to take up the position of rector of UNICAMP, his former university. After finishing his term, he became the operations manager and vice president of the Inter-American Development Bank in Washington, D.C. from 1991 to 1994.

Souza was one of the founding member of the Brazilian Social Democracy Party in 1988 and was Minister of Education from 1995 to 2002 under President Fernando Henrique Cardoso. During his time in office, Souza oversaw the implementation of the Enem exam system. On the other hand, during the same time, federal education faced an enormous scarcity of resources, which resulted in a huge strike in all federal education establishments throughout Brazil from the second half of 2001 to the first half of 2002.

In November 2006, Souza was elected to the Chamber of Deputies of Brazil to one of the 70 seats representing the State of São Paulo. He took leave of absence from the Chamber of Deputies on 27 March 2009 to take office as Secretary of Education of the State of São Paulo under Governor José Serra, replacing Maria Helena Guimarães de Castro. On 16 December 2010, he resigned this post, and returned to the Chamber of Deputies, finishing his term until 31 January 2011.

He died on 25 June 2011, from a heart attack while staying over the week-end at a hotel in São Roque, São Paulo.
