= Marcelo Knobel =

Brazilian physicist

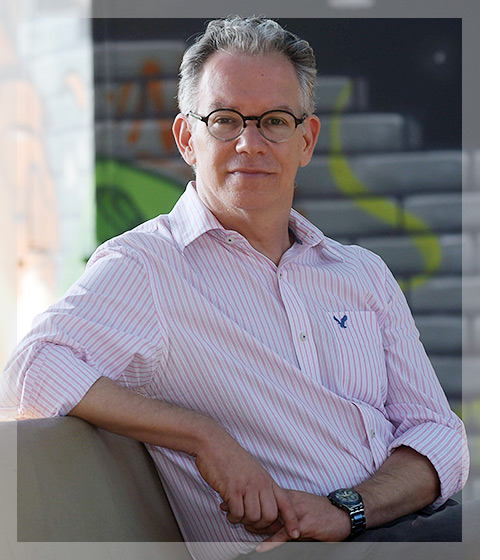
In 2020

Marcelo Knobel (born 18 July 1968) is an Argentine-born Brazilian physicist and professor who serves as executive-director of The World Academy of Sciences. A member of the Brazilian Academy of Sciences, he also served as rector of the State University of Campinas from 2017 to 2021.

== Biography ==
Born in Buenos Aires, Knobel and his family moved to Campinas to flee the Argentine military dictatorship. His father, a former professor at the University of Buenos Aires, continued his academic career at the University of Campinas, where he helped organize the Department of Medical Psychology and Psychiatry. Knobel studied physics at Unicamp, graduating in 1989. He presented the doctoral thesis Estudo do desenvolvimento de materiais nanocristalinos: magnetismo e estrutura, completed in 1992 under Reiko Sato Turtelli.

He then undertook postdoctoral positions at the Istituto elettrotecnico nazionale Galileo Ferraris (it), in Turin, and at the Instituto de Magnetismo Aplicado of the Complutense University of Madrid. In 1995, he was appointed professor at the Instituto de Física Gleb Wataghin (pt) of the State University of Campinas. In 2009, he received a Guggenheim Fellowship to research nanomagnetism. He serves as editor-in-chief of the science maganize Ciência e Cultura.

In 2007, he was awarded the National Order of Scientific Merit.
