= State University of Campinas =

Public university in São Paulo, Brazil

- Universidade Estadual de Campinas
- Logo of the State University of Campinas
- Other name: Unicamp
- Type: Public research university
- Established: December 28, 1962
- Founder: Zeferino Vaz
- Affiliations: Washington University in St. Louis McDonnell International Scholars Academy
- Budget: R$2.954 billion
- Rector: Paulo Cesar Montagner
- Academic staff: 1,795
- Administrative staff: 8,527
- Students: 34,616
- Undergraduates: 18,698
- Postgraduates: 15,918
- Location: Campinas, São Paulo, Brazil; 22°49′02″S 47°04′10″W
- Campus: Suburban
- Language: Portuguese
- Colors: Red & Black
- Website: www.unicamp.br

The State University of Campinas (Portuguese: Universidade Estadual de Campinas), commonly called Unicamp, is a public research university in the state of São Paulo, Brazil.

Established in 1962, Unicamp was designed from scratch as an integrated research center unlike other top Brazilian universities, usually created by the consolidation of previously existing schools and institutes. Its research focus reflects on almost half of its students being graduate students, the largest proportion across all large universities in Brazil, and also in the large number of graduate programs it offers: 153 compared to 70 undergraduate programs. It also offers several non-degree granting open-enrollment courses to around 8,000 students through its extension school.

Its main campus occupies 3.5 square kilometres (860 acres) located in the district of Barão Geraldo, a suburban area 12 kilometres (7.5 mi) from the downtown center of Campinas, built shortly after the creation of the university. It also has satellite campuses in Limeira, Piracicaba and Paulínia, and manages two technical high schools located in Campinas and Limeira. Funding is provided almost entirely by the state government and, like other Brazilian public universities, no tuition fees or administrative fees are charged for undergraduate and graduate programs.

Unicamp is responsible for around 15% of Brazilian research, a disproportionately high number when compared to much larger and older institutions in the country such as the University of São Paulo. It also produces more patents than any other research organization in Brazil, being second only to the state-owned oil company, Petrobras.

== History ==
=== 1960s: Foundation ===
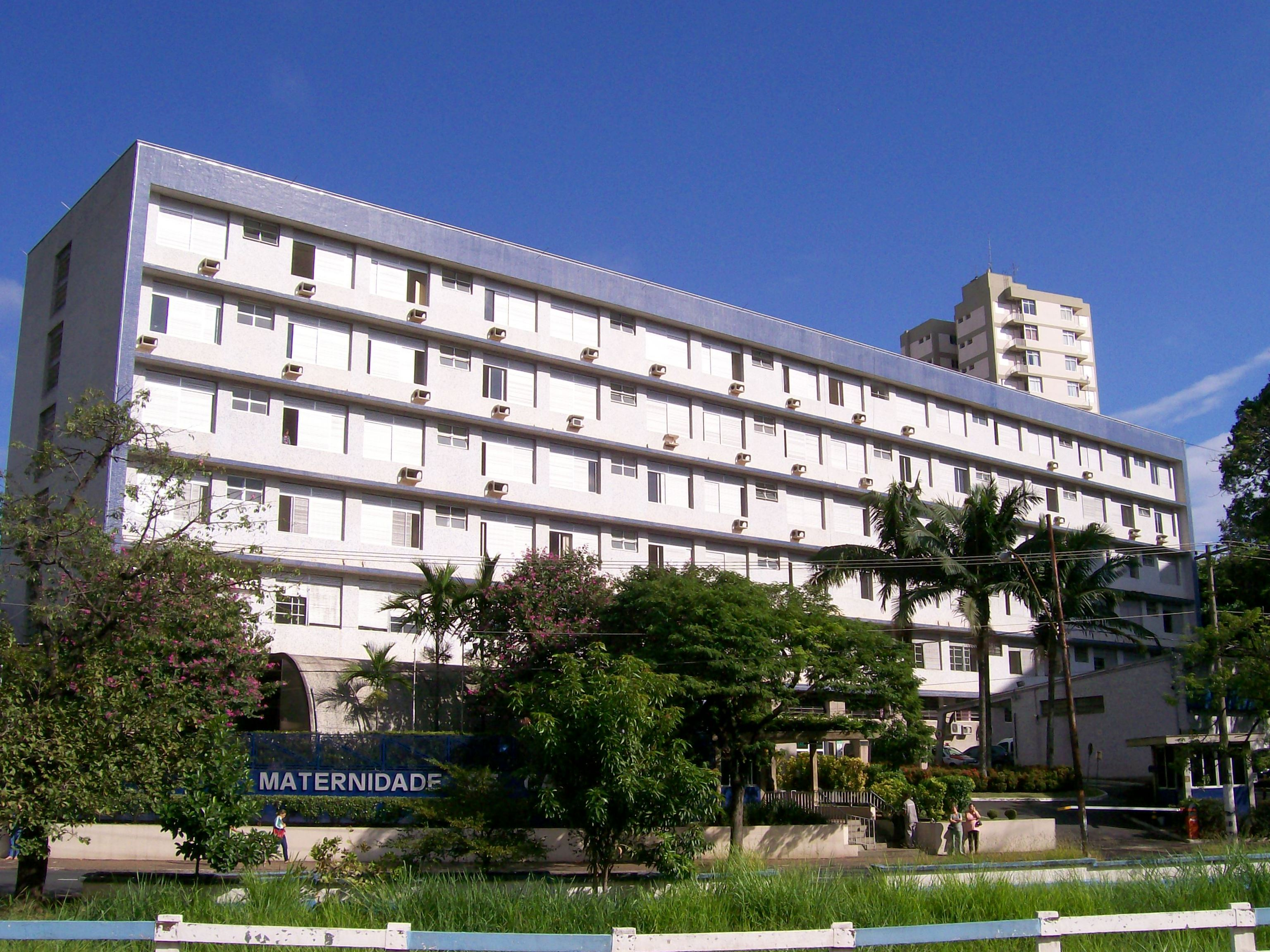
The Maternity of Campinas, where the School of Medical Sciences was originally located

In the early 1960s the Government of the State of São Paulo planned to open a new research center in the interior of the state to promote development and industrialization in the region, and commissioned Zeferino Vaz, founder of the University of São Paulo's School of Medicine in Ribeirão Preto, to organize it. In parallel, a medical school was being planned in Campinas, a demand from the local population that dated from the early 1940s. The School of Medicine of Campinas was created by law in 1959, but actual implementation never took place.

The new university was created by law on December 28, 1962, but effective functioning begun in 1966. Before that, only the School of Medicine functioned. In April 1963 the first vestibular, the general admissions exam, was conducted, with 1,592 candidates competing for 50 spots in the medicine program. The first lecture in the newly created University of Campinas took place on May 20 of the same year. By 1965, the organizing commission for the new university started looking for a location for a new campus. A large area comprising 110 hectares (270 acres) was donated by the Almeida Prado family, located in a valley in the district of Barão Geraldo in the city of Campinas, near the intersections of multiple highways. Until then, Barão Geraldo was a small village surrounded by farmland, in particular sugar cane plantations. The new development brought dramatic change to the district, resulting in entire new neighborhoods being zoned, planned and built, usually by the same Almeida Prado family.

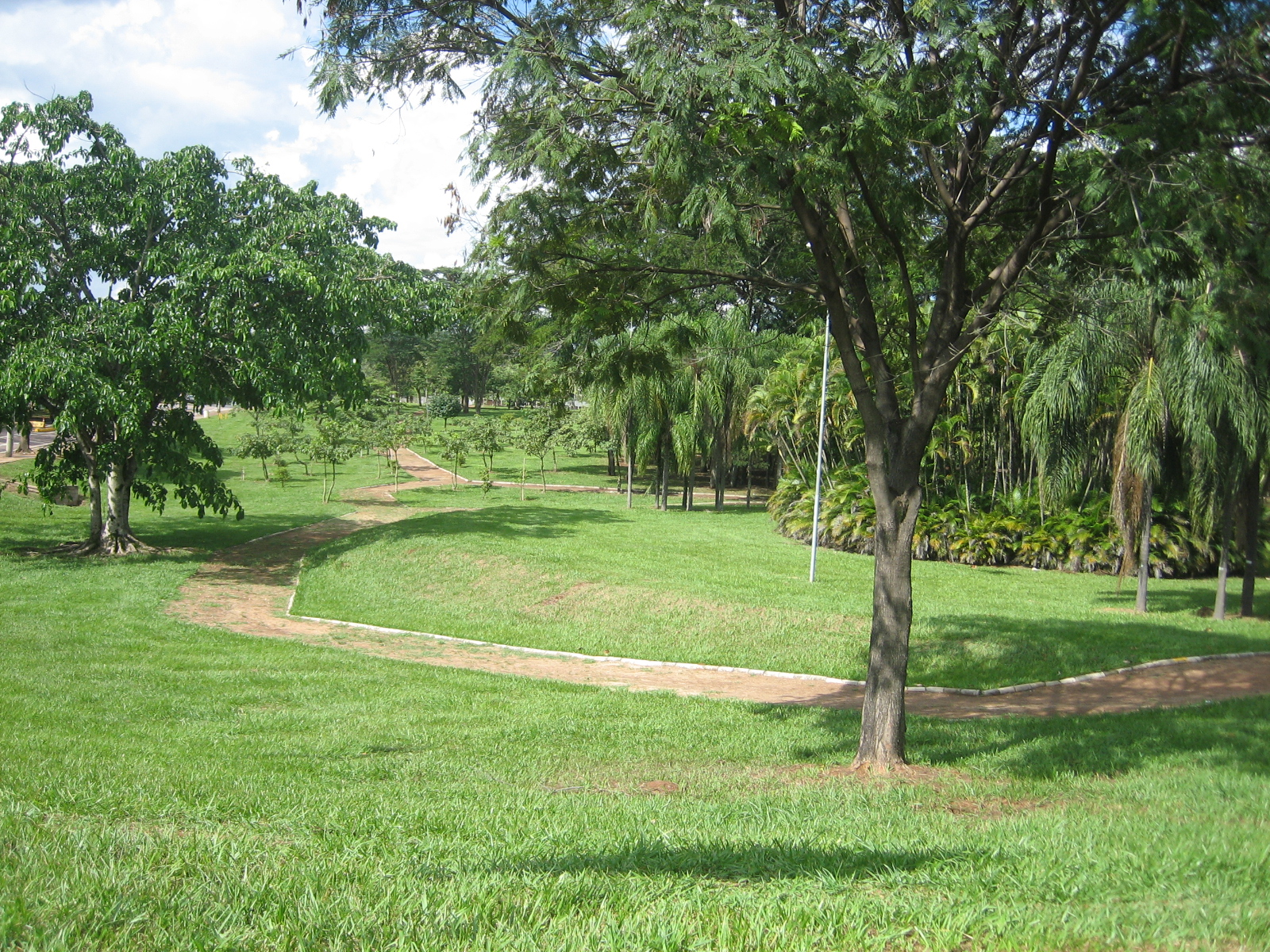
Peace Square at Unicamp

Work on the new campus began on October 5, 1966, and the first building completed was the Institute of Biology, followed by administrative buildings. In the same year, Zeferino Vaz was nominated the rector. In parallel to the new campus, new units were opened in other cities, absorbing local schools. The Dental School of Piracicaba was absorbed in 1967, and in 1969 the Engineering School of Limeira.

=== 1970–1990: Growth and crisis ===
Over the following two decades, the new university expanded rapidly. The campus quickly grew to 19 institutes and schools, and after Zeferino Vaz died in 1981 was named after him. With the campus construction completed, the School of Medical Sciences (formerly the School of Medicine of Campinas) was moved into the new campus, and its teaching hospital, Hospital de Clínicas, became the largest public hospital in the region.

Expansion on the campus continued rapidly, with new buildings, institutes and expansions being added nearly every year. However, by the late 1970s, the university faced a crisis. During its rapid expansion, it relied on draft bylaws, mostly borrowed from the University of São Paulo, and lacked formal internal regulations with the aging Zeferino Vaz, while no longer the rector, acting as a moderating force between parties with conflicting interests, in particular the leftist academic community and the State's government, appointed by the conservative military regime ruling the country.

After Zeferino's death in 1981, a conflict took place between the university's General Coordinator, appointed and backed by the government, and the Directive Council, composed of directors of different institutes. The rector introduced new rules reducing the power of the General Coordinator. As retaliation, the State's government removed 6 members of the Directive Council, replacing them with people from the state's Education Council, loyal to the governor, Paulo Maluf.

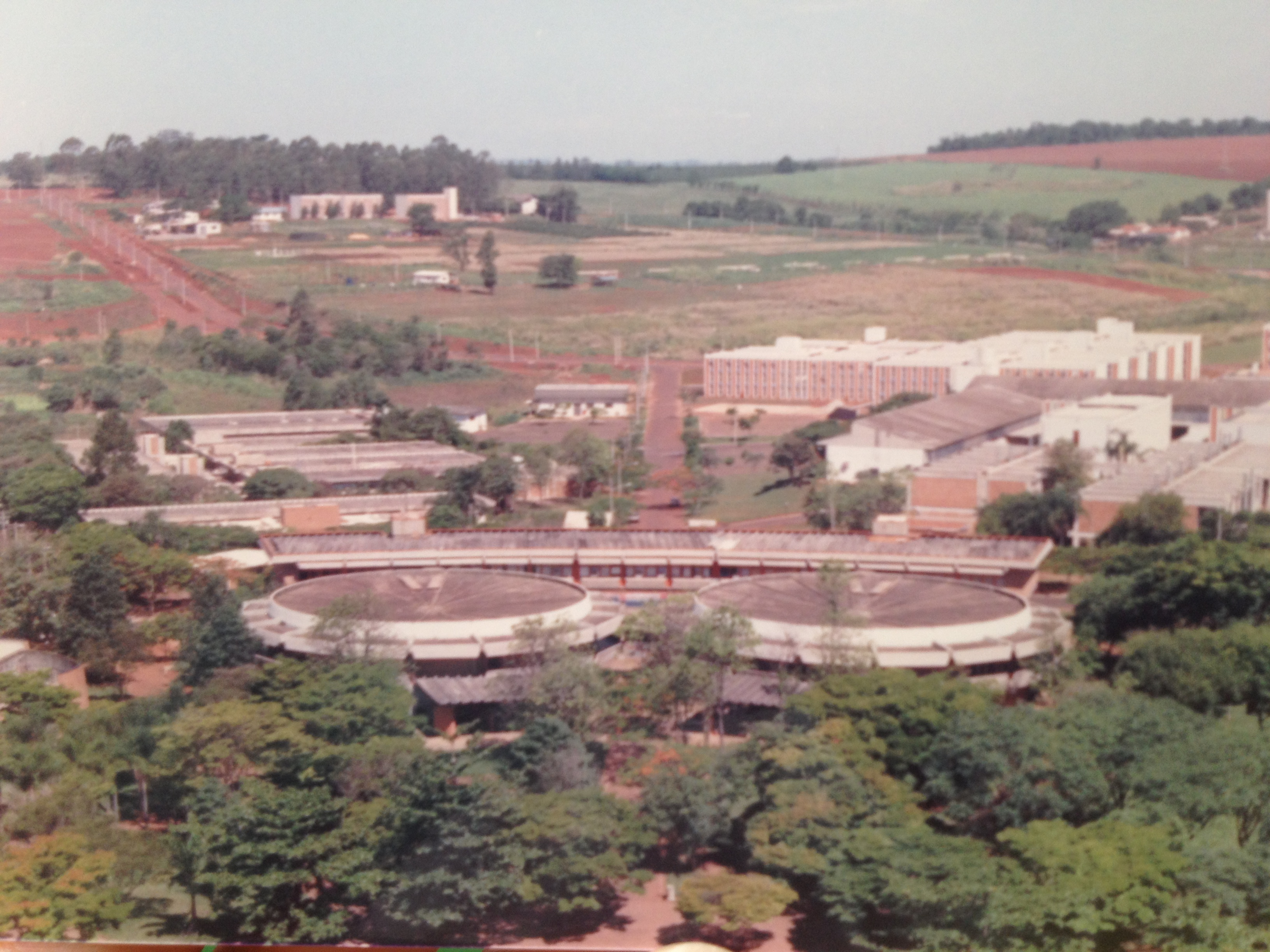
The campus around 1990, looking southeast from the central plaza

Tensions between the academic community and the government-appointed counselors increased, with the future Minister of Education, Paulo Renato Costa Souza, then president of the Faculty Association, classifying the episode as a "white intervention". Following the dismissal of several institute heads and members of the administration, the administrative workers went on strike, with the support of students and faculty. With activities in the university frozen by the strike, the governor declared a formal intervention in the university in October 1981.

Despite the police-backed intervention, the university continued on strike. The appointed institute heads failed to break the stalemate between internal and external forces, and by early 1982, discussions began on a new list of candidates to the rectorship. Eventually, José Aristodemo Pinotti, a former dean of the School of Medical Sciences generally considered a moderate, was selected by the academic community and accepted by the governor. In the following week, on April 19, 1982, the intervention was lifted, and academic activities resumed normally.

After the crisis, Unicamp saw a period of renewal and restructuring. In 1983 the bylaws were rewritten, ensuring the autonomy of the academic community, and the new management structure for the campus was implemented. In 1986 the newly created University Council replaces the previous Directive Council as the supreme body of the university. The last years of the 1980s saw a reformulation of the admissions exam, expansion of the laboratories and the completion of the first units of the student housing.

=== 1990 onwards ===
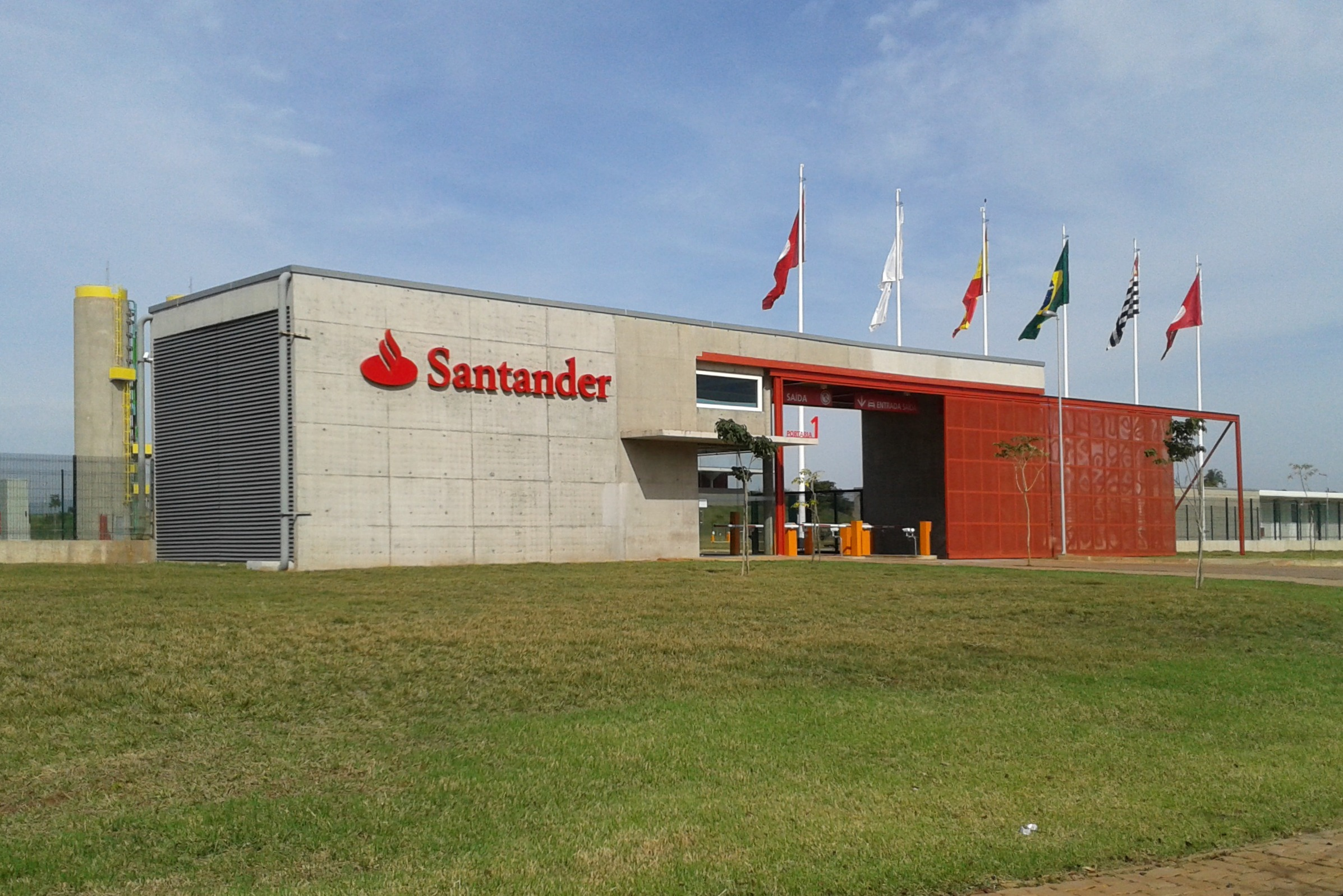
Entrance to Santander's datacenter, located next to Unicamp

With a new administrative structure capable of supporting continuous growth and with its autonomy secured, Unicamp went through a period of consolidation in the 1990s. There was an increase in night programs, created to provide an alternative for low-income students who had to work during the day, and to increase utilization of classrooms and the existing infrastructure, reaching one third of total available places.

The period also saw an expansion of the technology industry in the region, centered around Unicamp, with Motorola, IBM, Solectron, Lucent Technologies and many others set up research labs and production centers in the region driven by the large number of highly qualified students graduating every year, culminating in the opening of the Institute of Computing in 1996.

In the 2000s Unicamp consolidated itself as one of the leading research and education centers in Latin America but also brought new challenges: just as with other public universities in Brazil, the high payroll costs (over 90% of the total budget) constrain investment and expansion. This is further aggravated by the economic depression that Brazil has been facing since 2014, the largest in the country's history.

== Campus ==
=== Main campus ===
Aerial view of the main campus in the late 1990s

The flagship campus of the University of Campinas is located in the district of Barão Geraldo, 12 kilometres (7.5 mi) from the center of Campinas. It currently occupies an area of 350 hectares (860 acres) situated in a valley surrounded by gentle rolling hills and is bounded on the west by the urban area of Barão Geraldo, on the south and east by farmland and to the north by a lake and a new industrial park built in the 2000s.

==== Design ====
The campus has a unique design, with the main library, student service buildings and restaurant in a central circular plaza, and most of the academic buildings located in blocks emanating from the center in a radial fashion. The different areas of study are grouped in larger sections, but neighboring other areas with which they share similarities: the philosophy buildings mark the frontier between human sciences, mathematics and economics, while the School of Food Engineering is bordered by the chemical engineering and biology buildings. The architect responsible for the overall design of the campus was João Carlos Bross.

Streets are named after significant contributors to each field, including Elis Regina and Carlos Gomes Streets, a Brazilian singer and a composer, respectively, Alan Turing Avenue and others.

==== History ====
The area occupied by the campus was part of the much larger Rio das Pedras farm, owned by the prominent Almeida Prado family. In order to establish a new campus, Zeferino Vaz was looking for a large, flat area in the outskirts of the city, where he would have the freedom to design the campus and its surroundings from scratch. Interested in developing the area of the farm around Barão Geraldo, the family donated an initial area of 110 hectares (270 acres) to the university. The remainder of the farmland was eventually zoned and developed into multiple neighborhoods, but the main historical farmhouse and its surroundings remain, now a protected heritage site and a natural reserve.

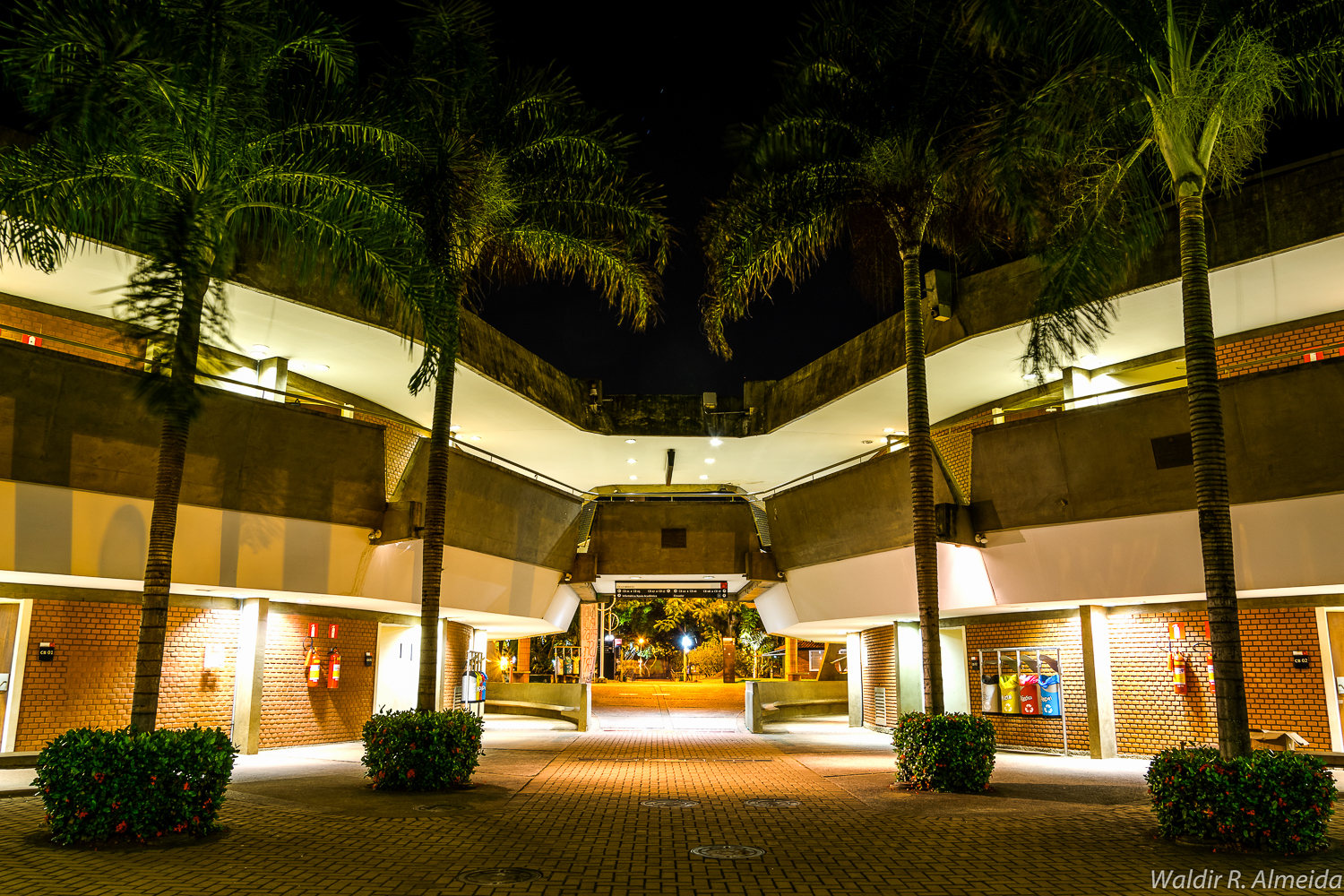
Ciclo Básico, set of classrooms shared by multiple programs

With the land secured, the campus was designed in a way to ensure the maximum collaboration between the different sciences, with buildings laid along radial streets emanating from a central circular plaza, which also hosted administrative buildings. The layout of the campus would eventually be used on the design of the university's logo, created by Max Schiefer, which is essentially a simplified map of the core circle of the campus. This design is similar to the University of California, Irvine campus, build around the same time.

Construction started in 1966, with General Castello Branco, the first president of Brazil's military regime, laying the cornerstone of the Institute of Biology, which was inaugurated in 1968, and classes started in the new campus on the following year. In 1971 the area of the campus was expanded by 130 hectares (320 acres), more than doubling its size, to accommodate the move of the School of Medical Sciences, until then located across several buildings in Campinas, to the new campus. This expansion saw the construction of a massive public hospital, the Hospital das Clínicas (HC), which began serving the public in 1979.

While initial construction was considered complete by 1978, the campus has grown through continuous addition of new buildings and institutes. In 2014, after years of negotiation, the university decided to buy the Argentina Farm, located on the east side of the campus, increasing the total area by 60% to 350 hectares (860 acres). This purchase will allow for expansion of the medical sciences and athletics areas, as well as new laboratories.

==== Medical center ====
Unicamp's main campus houses the School of Medical Sciences' teaching hospital, the Hospital das Clinicas. Construction started in 1975 and the hospital opened its first clinics and patient facilities in 1979, but was only fully operational in 1985, when the School of Medical Sciences was transferred from Campinas' maternity to the new campus.

The hospital has almost 1,000 beds, and serves half a million people every year through Brazil's unified public health system, SUS, performing on average 40 surgeries and 13 births every day. In the 2000s, the hospital was changed from a primary and secondary care to a specialized tertiary care center, receiving complex cases from other hospitals and clinics in the region, but around 60% of patients in the hospital are still cases that could be handled by local health centers.

The hospital directly employs 3,100 people, and also serves as a practice center for the university's faculty and a training and residency center for the students of medicine, nursery and speech therapy.

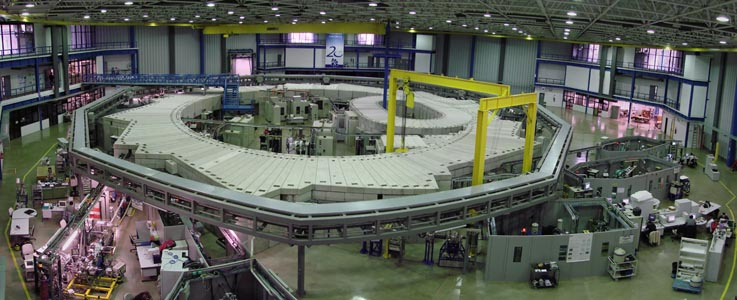
The National Synchrotron Light Laboratory

==== Synchrotron lab ====
While not part of Unicamp, the National Synchrotron Light Laboratory (LNLS) is a research institution focused on physics, structural biology and nanotechnology that maintains close ties with the university and is operated as part of the National Center for Research in Energy and Materials (CNPEM). The laboratory was designed in 1983 and began operating in 1997, located next to the main campus. The LNLS has Latin America's only particle accelerator, a synchrotron, used as a synchrotron light source designed and built in Brazil for various physical, chemical, geological, and biological studies.

=== Limeira ===
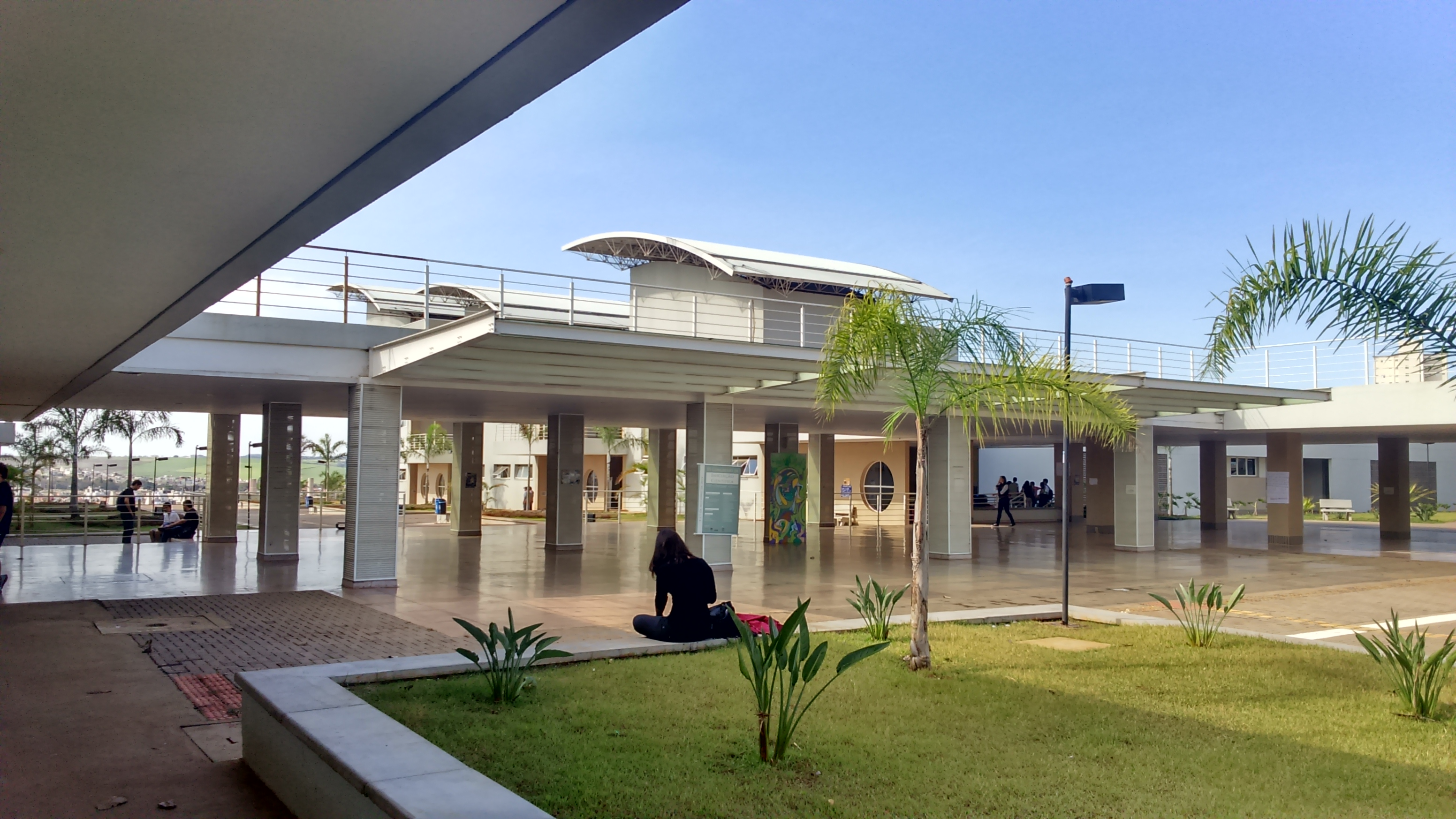
Campus of the School of Applied Sciences in Limeira

Unicamp's presence in Limeira, a city about 50 kilometres (31 mi) from Campinas, dates from the late 1960s, when the young university absorbed the Engineering School of Limeira, which became the School of Civil Engineering. The UNICAMP began offering technology courses in 1974 with the creation of a Sanitary Technology course. The course was designed to be taught during the day with the finish at least two years, in old installations of Faculty of Civil Engineering (FEC) in the city of Limeira. Later, in 1976 was created the course of Construction Technology, with specification in Building or Construction Methods of Soil. While this school was eventually transferred to the Campinas campus in 1989, new programs were launched by the university in Limeira, creating CESET, the School of Technology of Limeira, which still exists and is located near the center of the city, focused on technical higher education.

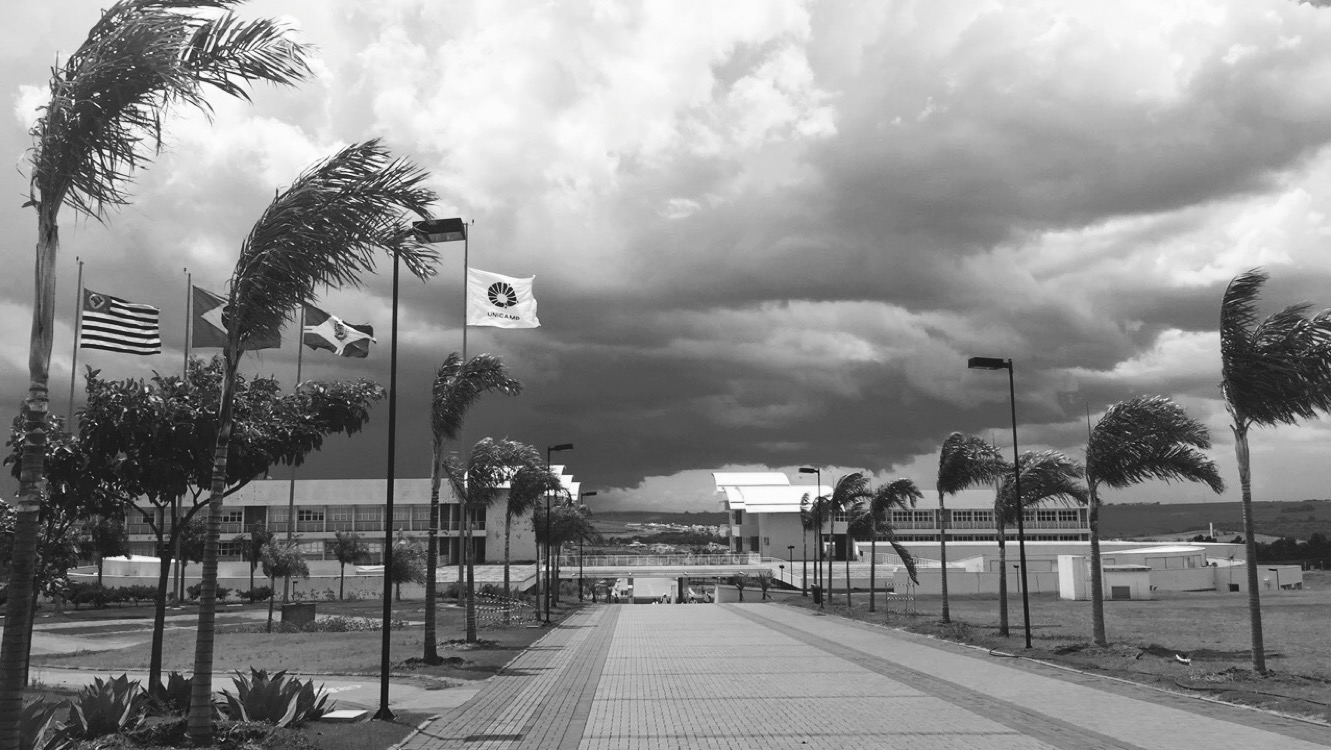
Main entrance to FCA Unicamp

In 2008 Unicamp decided to establish a new campus in Limeira, and in 2008 the School of Applied Sciences was created, offering programs such as public administration, business management, nutrition and industrial engineering. The total undergraduate class size for the new campus is 480 students per year.

=== Piracicaba ===
In 1967 Unicamp absorbed the School of Odontology of Piracicaba, founded in 1955 and located 50 kilometres (31 mi) northwest of the main campus in Campinas. With over 1,000 students, the school was initially located in a historic building near the center of the city, and in the 1970s a new campus was built, occupying an area of 60 hectares (150 acres) in what was then the outskirts of the city, and a short distance from USP's ESALQ.

=== Paulínia ===
In the neighboring city of Paulínia, the university operates a multidisciplinary research center focused on biosciences, acquired in 1986 from Monsanto and integrated into the university as CPQBA. As part of the acquisition, Unicamp gained access and continued research into subjects previously explored at the center, specially agricultural sciences. Research is usually funded by external parties, such as companies and other universities.

=== COTUCA and COTIL ===
In addition to the higher education programs, Unicamp is also responsible for running and funding two technical high schools, the Technical High School of Campinas (COTUCA) and the Technical High School of Limeira (COTIL). Cotuca was located for 50 years in a historical building near the center of the city built in 1918 which also housed Unicamp for a brief period before the current campus was built. In 2014 it was transferred to the main campus as the old building went through renovations. Both schools are amongst the best public high schools in the country, and are highly competitive, with admissions done through a selection exam open to middle-school students.

== Organization and administration ==
Similarly to other Brazilian institutions, Unicamp is composed of several semi-autonomous teaching units, designated as schools and institutes. Each unit is headed by a director from the faculty, equivalent to a dean, elected by the faculty and student representatives.

The university's administration is structured in a way similar to other public universities in Brazil. The supreme decision body is the University Council (CONSU), composed of all deans, plus several representatives from the academic community, students, administrative staff and the external community. The council meets roughly 4 to 5 times per year, ruling on high level administrative decisions such as approving the budget and has the final word in internal administrative processes. Routine administration is left to the rector, similar to a university chancellor in English-speaking countries, and the rectorate.

=== Rectors ===
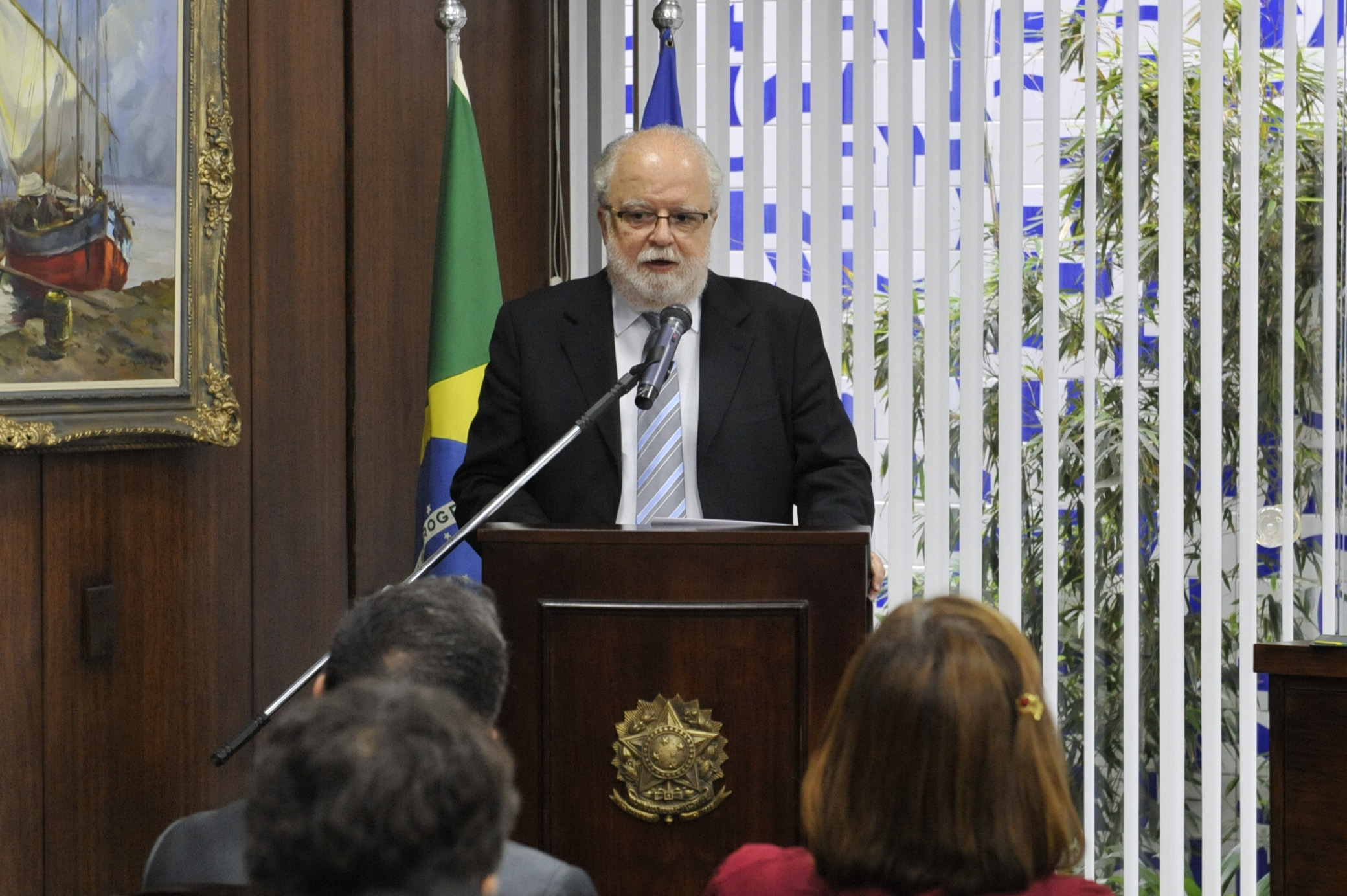
The former rector, José Tadeu Jorge

The rector is chosen by the governor of the State of São Paulo from a list of 3 candidates elected by the university's community, including students and administrative staff. Traditionally, the governor always selects the candidate with the largest number of votes, but it retains the power to choose a different one should it decide to do so. The rector serves for a term of 4 years before a new election is held, and can not be reelected in the following term. Zeferino Vaz was the first rector and held the position for 12 years until his mandatory retirement.

1. Zeferino Vaz (1966–1978)
2. Plínio Alves de Moraes (1978–1982)
3. José Aristodemo Pinotti (1982–1986)
4. Paulo Renato Costa Souza (1986–1990)
5. Carlos Vogt (1990–1994)
6. José Martins Filho (1994–1998)
7. Hermano Tavares (1998–2002)
8. Carlos Henrique de Brito Cruz (2002–2005)
9. José Tadeu Jorge (2005–2009)
10. Fernando Ferreira Costa (2009–2013)
11. José Tadeu Jorge (2013–2017)
12. Marcelo Knobel (2017–2021)
13. Antonio José de Almeida Meirelles, Tom Zé, (2021–2025)
14. Paulo Cesar Montagner, Cesinha, (2025–present)

=== Schools and institutes ===
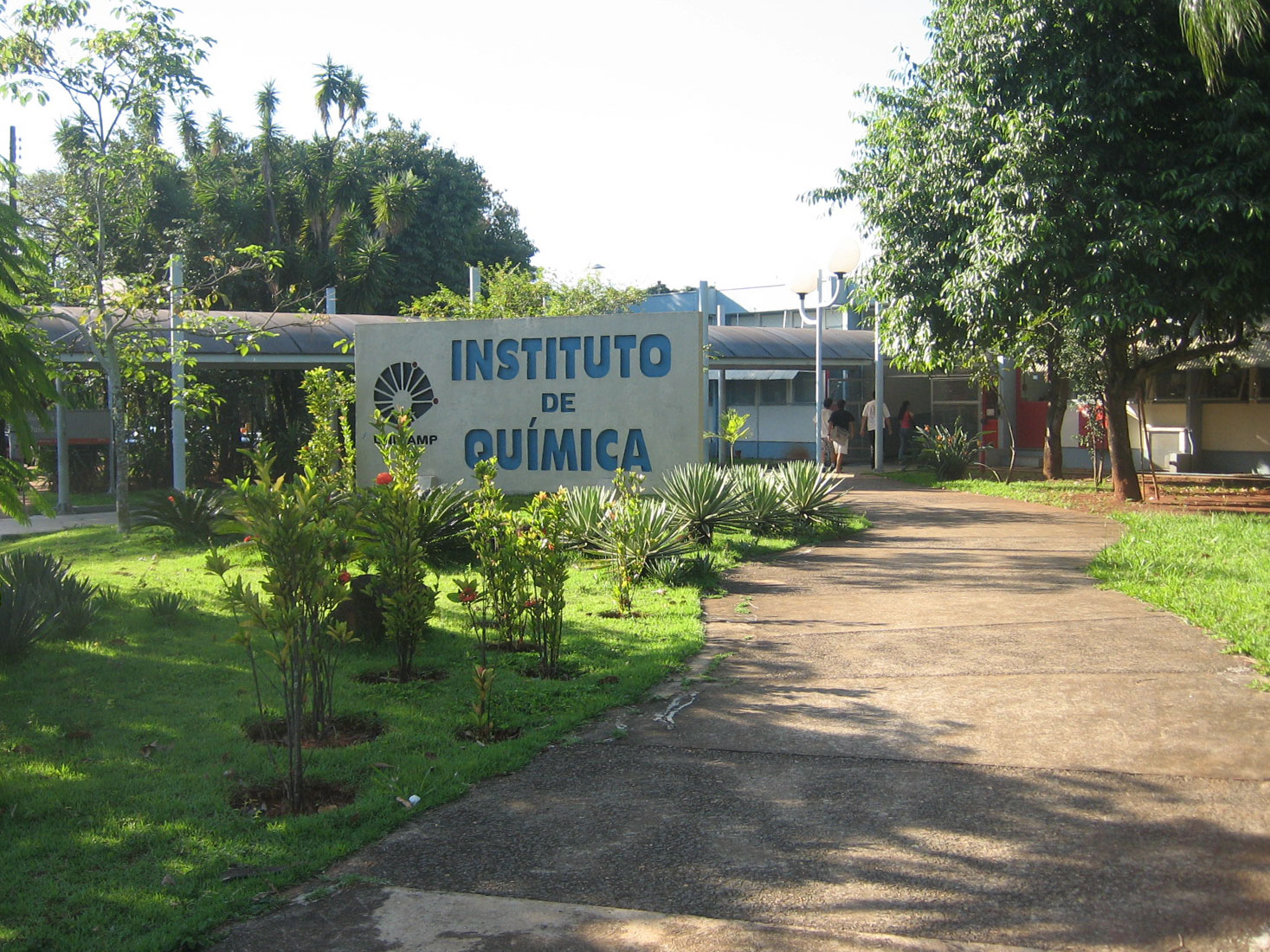
Institute of Chemistry

Unicamp is composed of a total of 24 units, 10 of which are institutes and 14 are schools. The university is also home to 22 interdisciplinary centers which conduct research and outreach on topics ranging from dance (such as LUME) to computing and education (such as NIED).

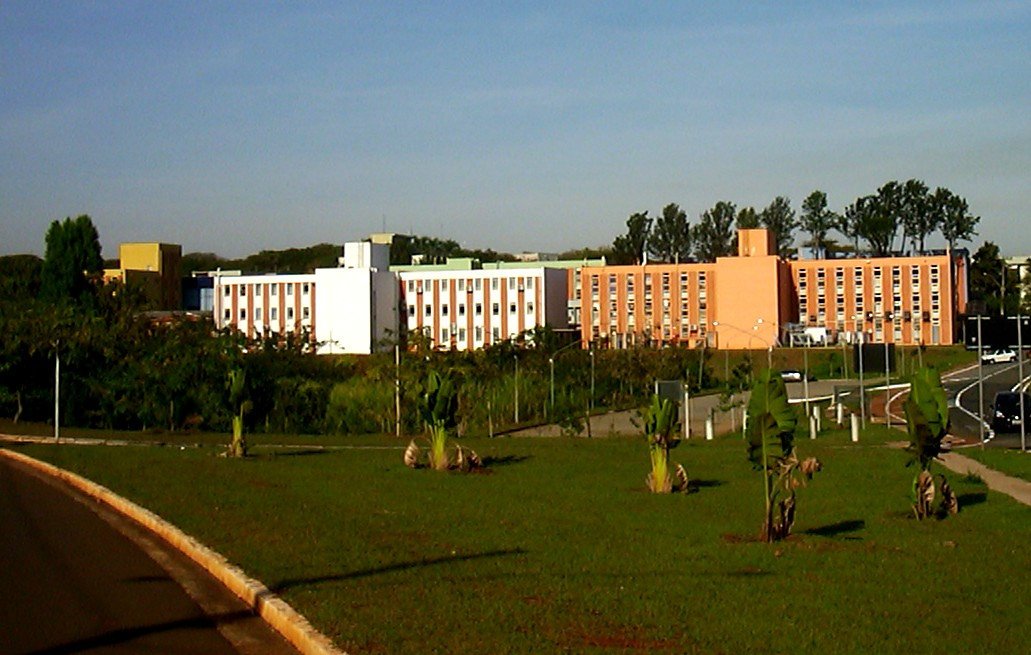
School of Chemical Engineering

- School of Medical Sciences
- School of Applied Sciences
- School of Odontology of Piracicaba
- School of Education
- School of Physical Education
- School of Electrical and Computer Engineering
- School of Chemical Engineering
- School of Food Engineering
- School of Pharmaceutical Sciences
- School of Nursing
- School of Mechanical Engineering
- School of Agricultural Engineering
- School of Civil Engineering, Architecture and Urbanism
- School of Technology of Limeira
- Institute of Chemistry
- Institute of Physics Gleb Wataghin
- Institute of Biology
- Institute of Computing
- Institute of Mathematics, Statistics and Scientific Computing
- Institute of Economics
- Institute of Philosophy and Human Sciences
- Institute of Language Studies
- Institute of Arts
- Institute of Geosciences

Unicamp is also responsible for two technical high schools, the Technical High School of Campinas (COTUCA) and the Technical High School of Limeira (COTIL).

=== Funding & financial information ===
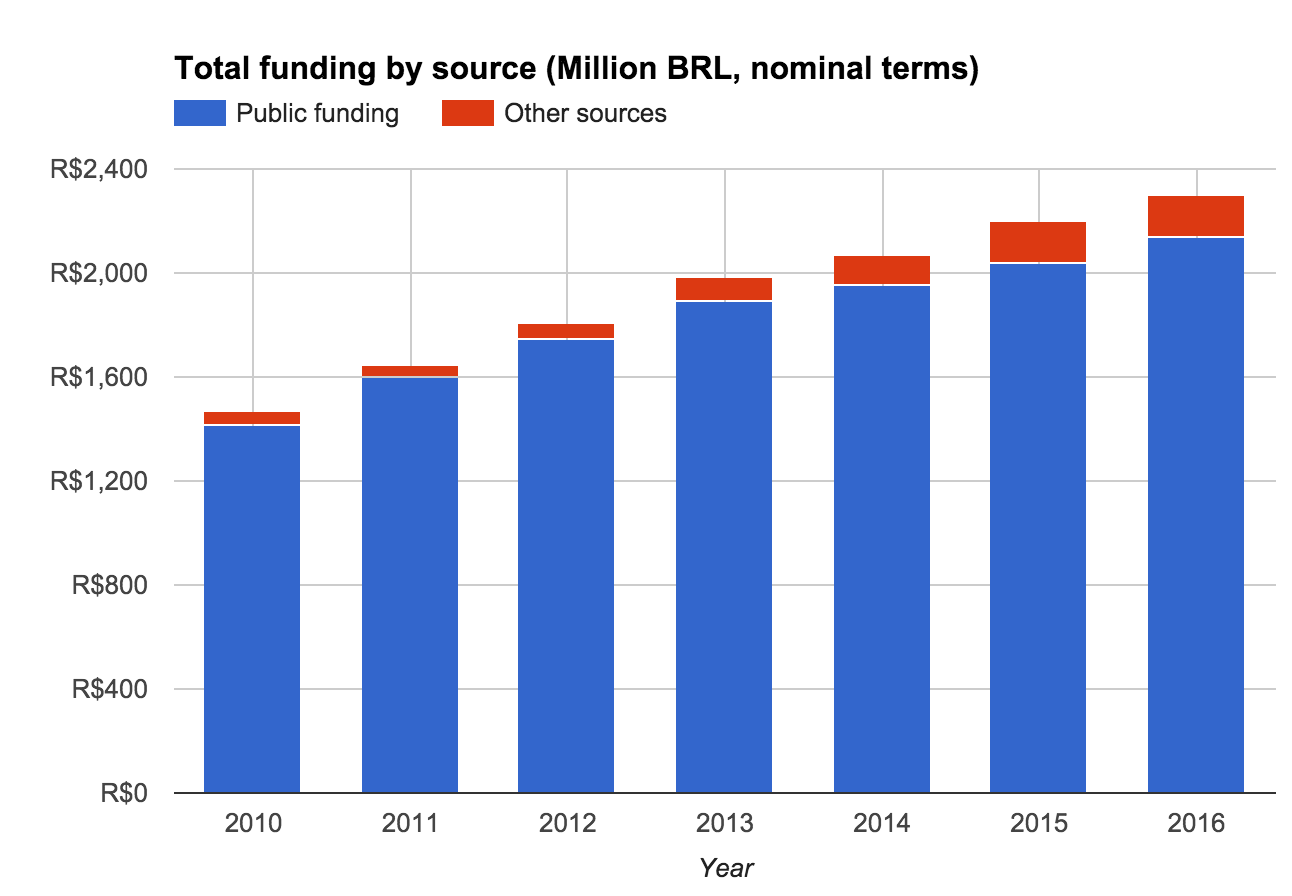
Yearly funding by source

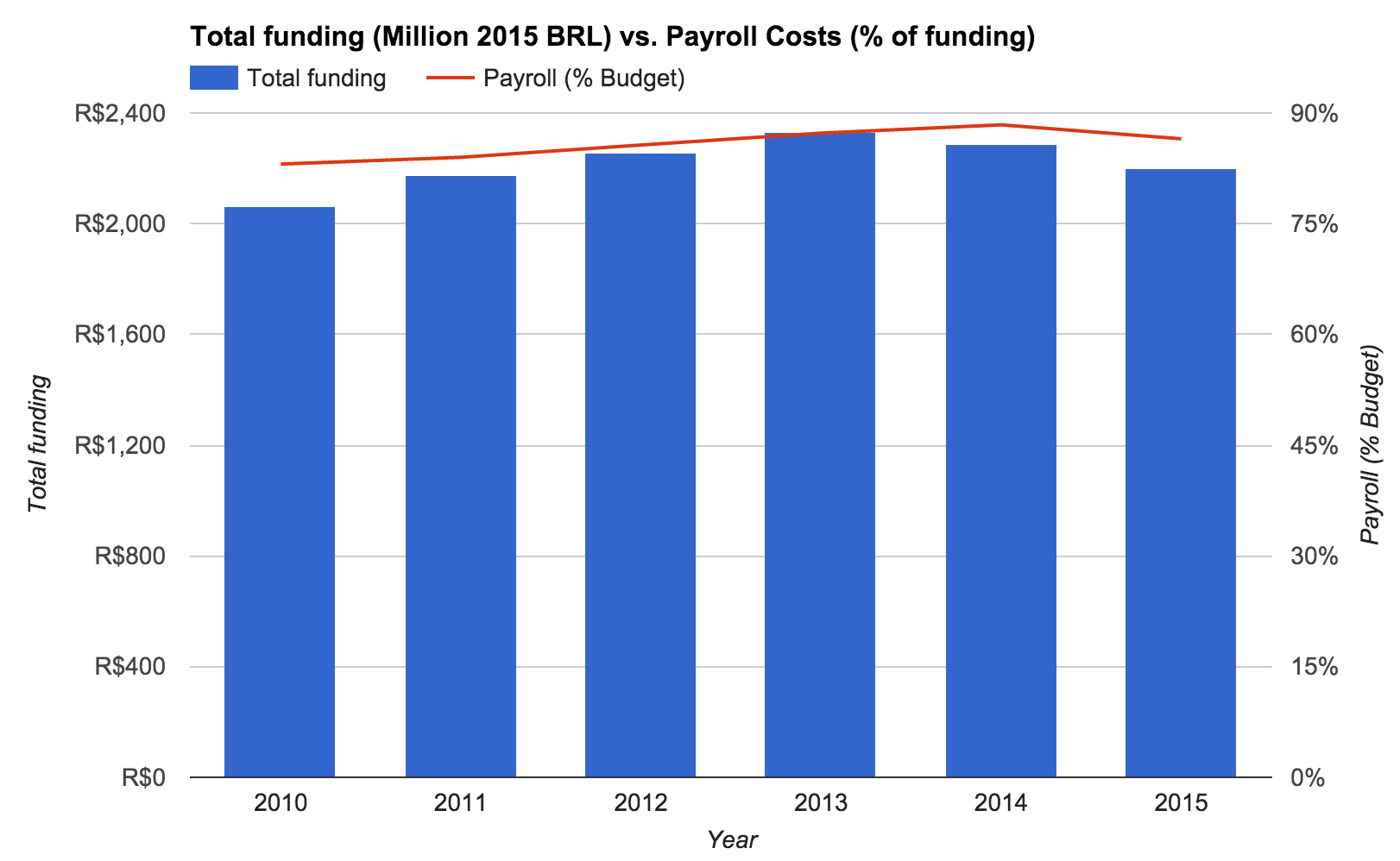
Funding in real terms and payroll

Like other public universities in Brazil, Unicamp is almost entirely funded by the government, in this particular case of the State of São Paulo. Funding is provided mainly from sales taxes, but a small percentage of total budget is obtained from donations, paid extension programs and corporate sponsors.

The total budget proposed for 2016 is of R$2.3 billion, a decrease by almost 7% in real terms when compare to 2015. Fixed costs (payroll, interest and debt service) will account for 92.2% of the government funding. And additional 4% is spent on student assistance and 2% on utilities.

A problem faced by Unicamp, and other public universities in Brazil, is the high dependency on economic conditions, that directly impact tax earnings, while most of the expenses, payroll specially, are indexed to inflation. While not as critical as in similar universities (at the University of São Paulo payroll accounted for over 106% of the total funding available in 2014), Unicamp currently faces a funding crisis, with total funding expected to decrease in real terms while payroll, which takes around 85% of total university funding, is expected to increase in line with inflation. This situation is aggravated by the long-running trend of raising staff salaries above inflation as a response to the annual strikes led by the workers' union, STU.

== Academics ==
At Unicamp, academic studies are usually divided into four main areas: exact sciences (which includes formal and physical sciences), human sciences (roughly equivalent to social science, including Arts), biological sciences (roughly equivalent to life sciences) and technologies (including engineering and technical studies). This division reflects on how the university are structured how the campuses was designed.

=== Undergraduate programs ===
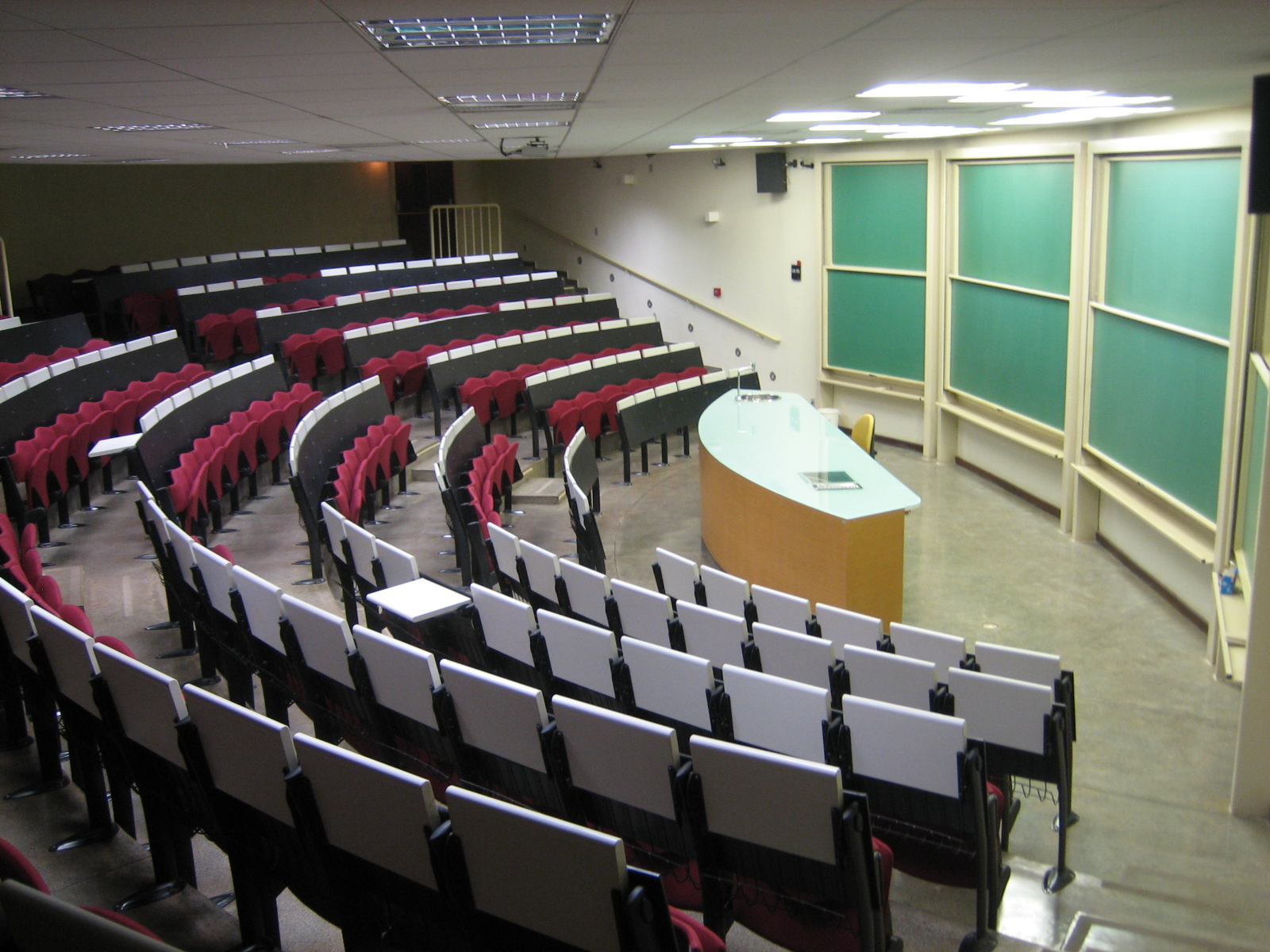
Classroom in the main campus

Unicamp offers 70 different degree-granting undergraduate programs, covering nearly all different areas of science. Completing an undergraduate program grants either a bachelor's degree or a licentiate degree, although some programs offer both degrees. In line with the Brazilian educational system, no graduate education is required to practice any profession, including law and medicine, so undergraduate programs vary in length to provide all the necessary training. Most programs at Unicamp last a total of 4 years, with engineering programs typically lasting 5 years and medicine lasting 6 years.

The academic year is aligned with the calendar year, with classes usually starting in late February, and ending in early December, the beginning of summer in Brazil. The year is divided into two semester terms, and all courses are a semester long. While there is a suggested curriculum for each program, students are free to choose any classes to attend during a specific semester, and class attribution is done in the basis of grade average, with higher-graded students having priority when choosing classes.

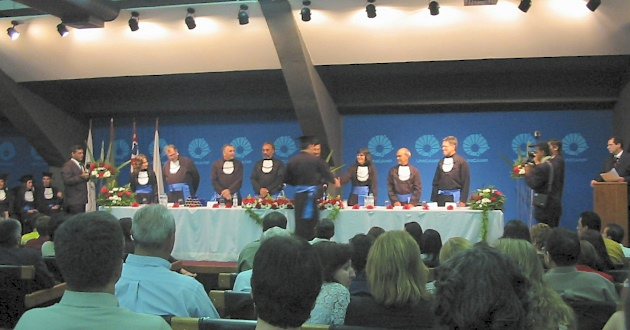
A graduation ceremony

Students are admitted to a single program and are expected to take all the classes required to complete that program in the number of semesters prescribed, although they can take 50% longer before facing administrative measures. While each program is usually managed by a single school or institute (exceptions apply, such as Computer Engineering, co-managed by the Institute of Computing and the School of Electrical and Computer Engineering), classes are usually ministered across different institutes or schools.

Program class sizes usually range between 30 and 60 students per year for each program, but some programs can have over 100 students per year, and are named by the year of admission: the class of 2015 is composed of all students entering in the year of 2015, regardless of the program length or expected graduation. There is no campus-wide graduation ceremony, with each school or institute conducting its own.

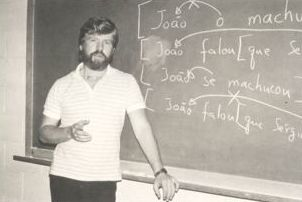
Daniel Everett during his graduate studies on the Pirahã language at Unicamp

=== Graduate programs ===
Unicamp offers 153 postgraduate programs, with about half of those being masters, serving almost 16 thousand students, one third of which come from outside the State of São Paulo, and around 5% are international students. Just as with undergraduate studies, students pay no tuition fees. While the programs are coordinated by the rectorship, the individual institutions have a lot of freedom on defining the focus, length and admission process of each program.

=== Extension programs and community outreach ===
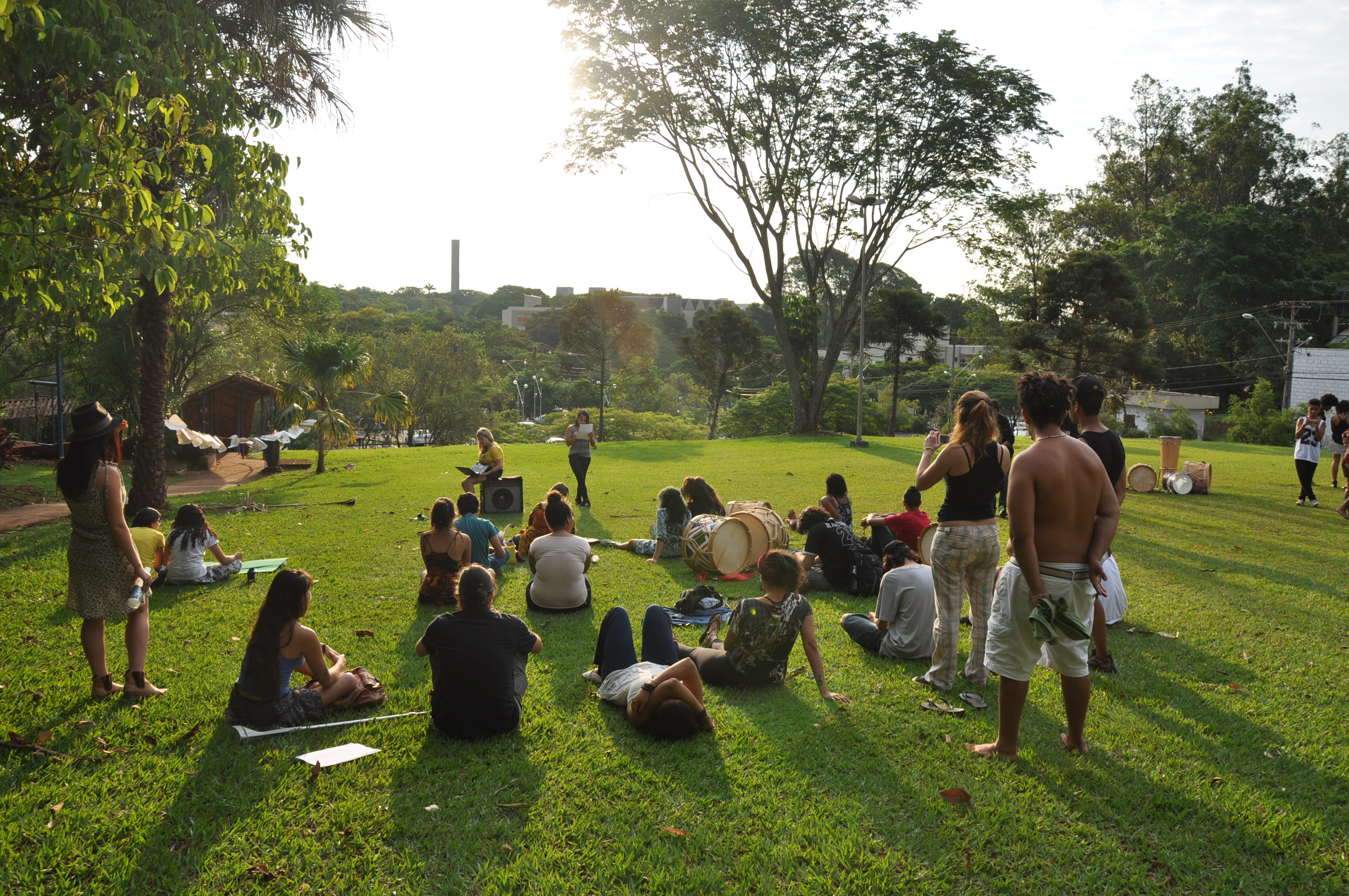
Art performance at Unicamp

Unicamp offers over one thousand extension programs to the community, with different levels of minimum requirements (high school degree, undergraduate degree, etc.) and across all areas of study, focusing mainly on specialization courses and community outreach. The programs are mainly coordinated by the Pro-Rectorate for Extension and Outreach (Pró-Reitoria de Extensão e Assuntos Comunitários, PREAC). PREAC aims to promote actions of extension and culture through integration with society, disseminating and acquiring knowledge through the academic community.

Specialization programs are either offered by Unicamp's extension school, Extecamp, or directly by the schools and institutes. In the past 25 years, over 100,000 students have been reached and in 2014, Unicamp joined Coursera and currently eight online courses are being offered, two of them are between the most popular Coursera courses in Brazil. Outreach actions take a variety of forms, including events, publications, technological, educational, cultural and social products and services. The Department for Cultural Development hosts several events, usually open for the surrounding community. Events are also held at the Casa do Lago Cultural Space and at the Cultural Center for Social Inclusion and Integration.

Every year, Unicamp also hosts an open doors event (Unicamp de Portas Abertas, UPA), in which the main campus is visited by over 50 thousand high school students from across the country. The event provides presentations and discussions on the role of the university in the society, as well as career presentations and tours, with the students visiting several areas of the university and gaining a better understanding of the different areas of study.

=== Faculty ===
Unicamp employs close to 1,800 professors, nearly all with at least a doctoral degree. The faculty career is structured in three major tiers:

- Doctor Professor (Professor Doutor, equivalent to assistant professor): candidates must have a doctoral or equivalent degree
- Associate Professor (Professor Associado): candidates must have a Livre Docente title, similar to the German Habilitation
- Tenured Professor (Professor Titular) – MS-6 (top rank, only MS-6 professors are allowed to hold positions such as Dean of a Faculty/School or Rector of the university)

Hiring is done through a civil service examination, including a written test, a teaching examination, academic history analysis and other additional criteria. The same process is required for professors changing tiers: an associate professor pursuing a tenure position must go through the same examination process compete with other external candidates for the position. The two initial tiers also include sub levels, and professors are promoted between them for merit. Monthly starting salary for a full-time assistant professorship is around R$ 10 thousand, and for a tenured position around R$15 thousand. Uniquely among public universities in Brazil, Unicamp has a career focused on full-time research. Currently there are approximately 100 full-time researchers at the university.

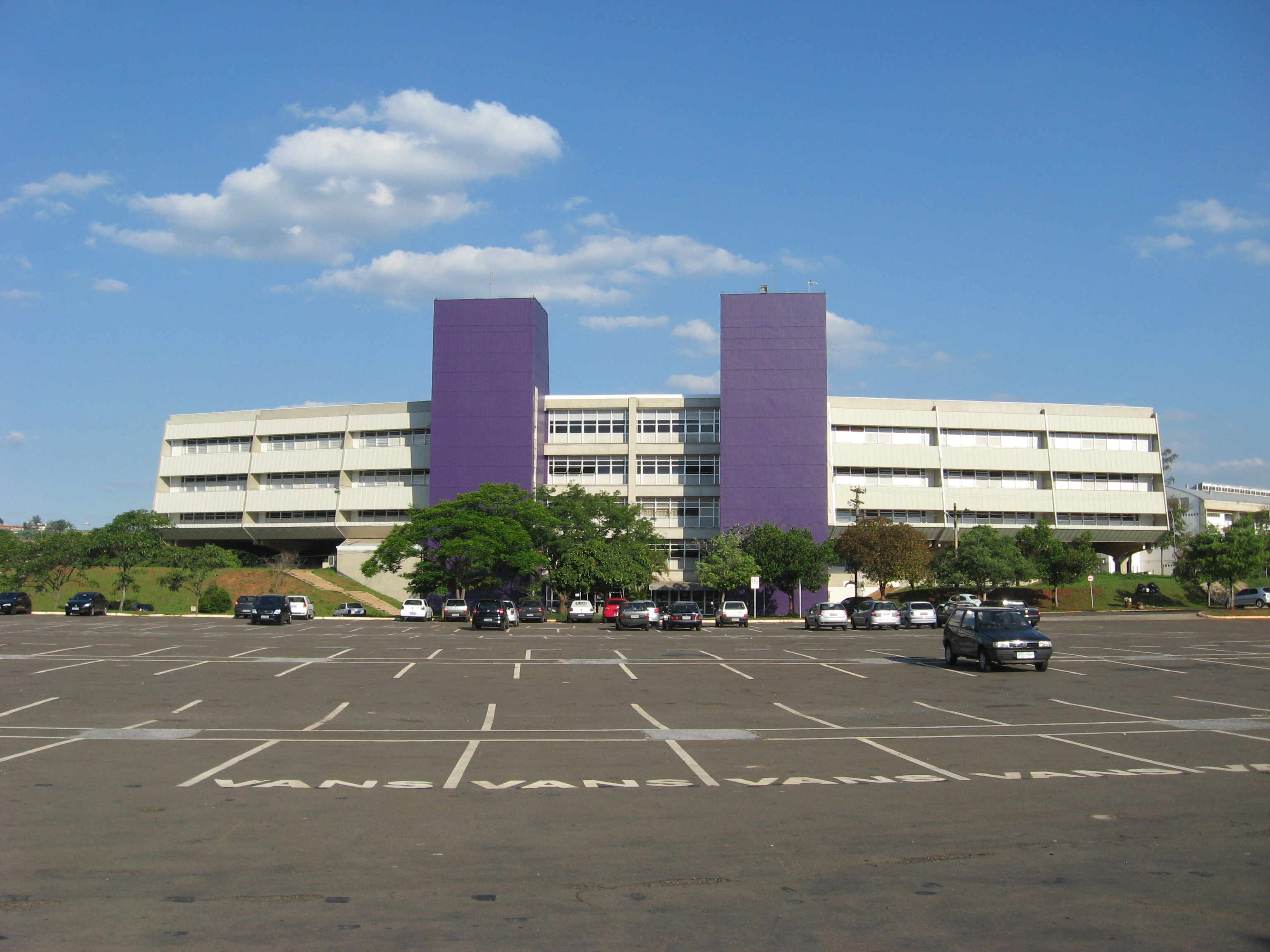
Unicamp's César Lattes Central Library

=== Library system ===
The university's library system (Sistema de Bibliotecas da Unicamp; SBU) comprises a large central library named in honor of César Lattes, and 27 other satellite libraries, located in the individual institutions, housing over 1 million volumes, in addition to hundreds of thousands of ebooks and academic journals. The system was officially created in 1983, aggregating the several independent libraries that operated across the university. The large central library was inaugurated six years later, in 1989.

The library system is automated and its collections may be accessed and searched on the Internet. Its Digital Library section supports a database with more than 25,000 dissertations presented in the university, as well access to the largest electronic libraries of academic journals in the world. It also includes several historical libraries and media archives focused on specific authors and topics, such as the Edgard Leuenroth Archive and collections honoring César Lattes, Sérgio Buarque de Holanda, Monteiro Lobato and others.

== Admissions ==
=== Undergraduate programs ===
Demographics of applicants in 2016
Color or race	Applied	Admitted	São Paulo State
White	72.4%	68.6%	63.9%
Pardo	15.4%	18.2%	29.1%
Asian	5.0%	5.0%	1.4%
Black	3.8%	4.0%	5.5%
Native	0.2%	0.2%	0.1%
Undeclared	3.2%	4.0%	0.0%

Similarly to other Brazilian public universities, admissions to undergraduate programs are through a comprehensive general examination, called vestibular. While other Brazilian public universities, specially federally managed ones, which use the National High School Exam (ENEM, in Portuguese Exame Nacional do Ensino Médio) as an entrance exam, Unicamp has its own national entrance exam applied yearly by its Vestibular Commission (COMVEST, in Portuguese Comissão Permanente para os Vestibulares) in two rounds. Generally, the first round happens in November and is a test composed of 90 multiple-choice general knowledge questions. Students applying to programs that require specific skills (such as music, architecture, dance, and others) must take a specific knowledge test even before the first phase.

Selection in the admissions process is program-specific. Applicants that score a minimum standardized grade in the first round are selected to participate in the second round, which takes place over three days in January, where they must answer 48 short-answer written questions, plus write two long-form essays, on themes selected by the evaluation board.

The Unicamp national exam is very competitive and is considered one of the most difficult in Brazil. In 2015 there were 77,145 applications for only 3,320 possible places, with 23 candidates competing for each position in an undergraduate program, an average acceptance rate of 4.3%. The exam covers all topics taught in the Brazilian high school system, including Portuguese, mathematics, Brazilian and world history, geography, biology, physics, chemistry, sociology, philosophy, arts and English. Despite that, questions in the exams are generally interdisciplinary.

Most selective undergraduate programs – 2016
Program	Class size	Applications	Acceptance rate
Medicine	110	24,206	0.5%
Architecture	30	3,342	0.9%
Communication	30	1,508	2.0%
Biology	45	2,045	2.2%
Civil Engineering	80	3,582	2.2%

The most competitive undergraduate programs are Medicine with a 0.5% acceptance rate, Architecture and Urbanism with 0.6%, and Communication with 2%. Such high competitivity leads many students to take preparatory courses during or after the last regular high school year called cursinhos in Portuguese, generally privately offered or managed by some association or organization. Many private cursinhos have special classes focused on highly competitive programs like medicine, making them very expensive. It is common to find students admitted in Medicine, Engineering and other programs after several years of preparatory courses.

While the selection process is need-blind and race-blind, most of the best high schools and preparatory schools in Brazil are private and very expensive, and represent a majority of admissions in Brazilian public universities, leading to increased inequality in the country. To remedy this, Unicamp introduced in 2004 the Social Inclusion and Affirmative Action Program (PAAIS, in Portuguese Programa de Ação Afirmativa e Inclusão Social) that allows high schoolers coming from public schools to receive a bonus score in their overall vestibular score. While not focused on racial and ethnical factors, over the years, the PAAIS initiative has increased the number of admission of minorities from public high school, especially black and native-Brazilians, historically the most economical and social fragile groups in Brazil. With this program, around 30% of admissions come from public schools, and the participation of minorities increased from 10% to around 30%.

=== Graduate programs ===
Unlike undergrad admissions, there is no single admission process for graduate students. Each institution inside Unicamp has its own set of procedures, which usually include an admissions exam which can be specific for Unicamp or a standard exam applied across the country (such as ANPEC (in Portuguese) for economics, and PosComp (in Portuguese) for computer science. Besides the exam, the process usually includes an academic history analysis, interviews and in many cases requires a submission of a research project to be undertaken during the graduate studies.

== Student life ==
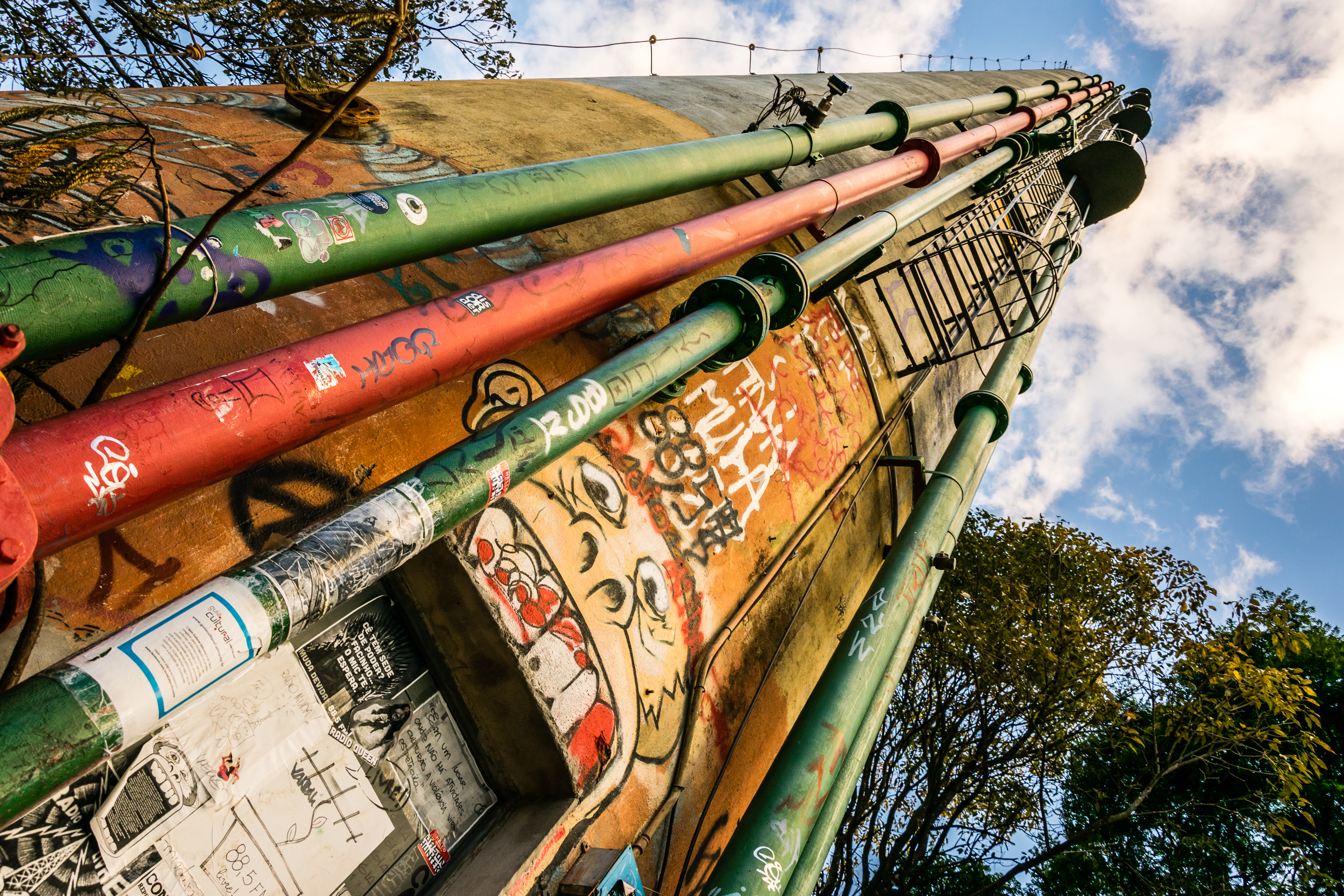
The central water tower, home to the student-run Rádio Muda

=== Housing ===
Similarly to other Brazilian universities, Unicamp offers no large-scale in-campus housing, and most students live either near the campus or in Campinas. A student tradition in Brazil, inherited from the Portuguese universities, is the república, a fraternity-style private housing where multiple students rent large houses or apartments and live together. Dues to the suburban campus and the large number of students coming from other cities, repúblicas play a key role in the student life, serving as centers for social life, parties and also study and work areas. While some repúlicas have existed for decades, sometimes moving from one house to another, most are formed by students in the same or similar classes, and last for a few years.

Besides repúblicas, studio apartments are very common around the university. While more expensive than the shared houses, they afford more privacy and have more flexible contracts, are well as being furnished.

==== University housing ====
Unicamp provides a limited amount of free housing to low income students in the Student Residence compound. Built in 1992, it is located near the center of Barão Geraldo, about four kilometers from Unicamp, and is served by a university shuttle that takes student to the campus and back free of charge. The compound has 226 houses of 60 square metres (650 sq ft), with a capacity of four students per house, and 27 studios of 46 square metres (500 sq ft), for couples with children, a total of 904 vacancies in houses and 54 adults in the studios. Assignment criterion is means-based, with lower income students receiving priority.

The Student Residence supports several cultural projects developed by voluntary and worker students and open to the participation of internal and external community. It encourages interdisciplinary training and integration between the resident students and the external community. The diversity of races and cultures, brought by colleagues from other states and countries is an advantage for the residents who live in the house, facilitating full citizenship, through the exercise of their rights and duties within the community.

=== University restaurants ===
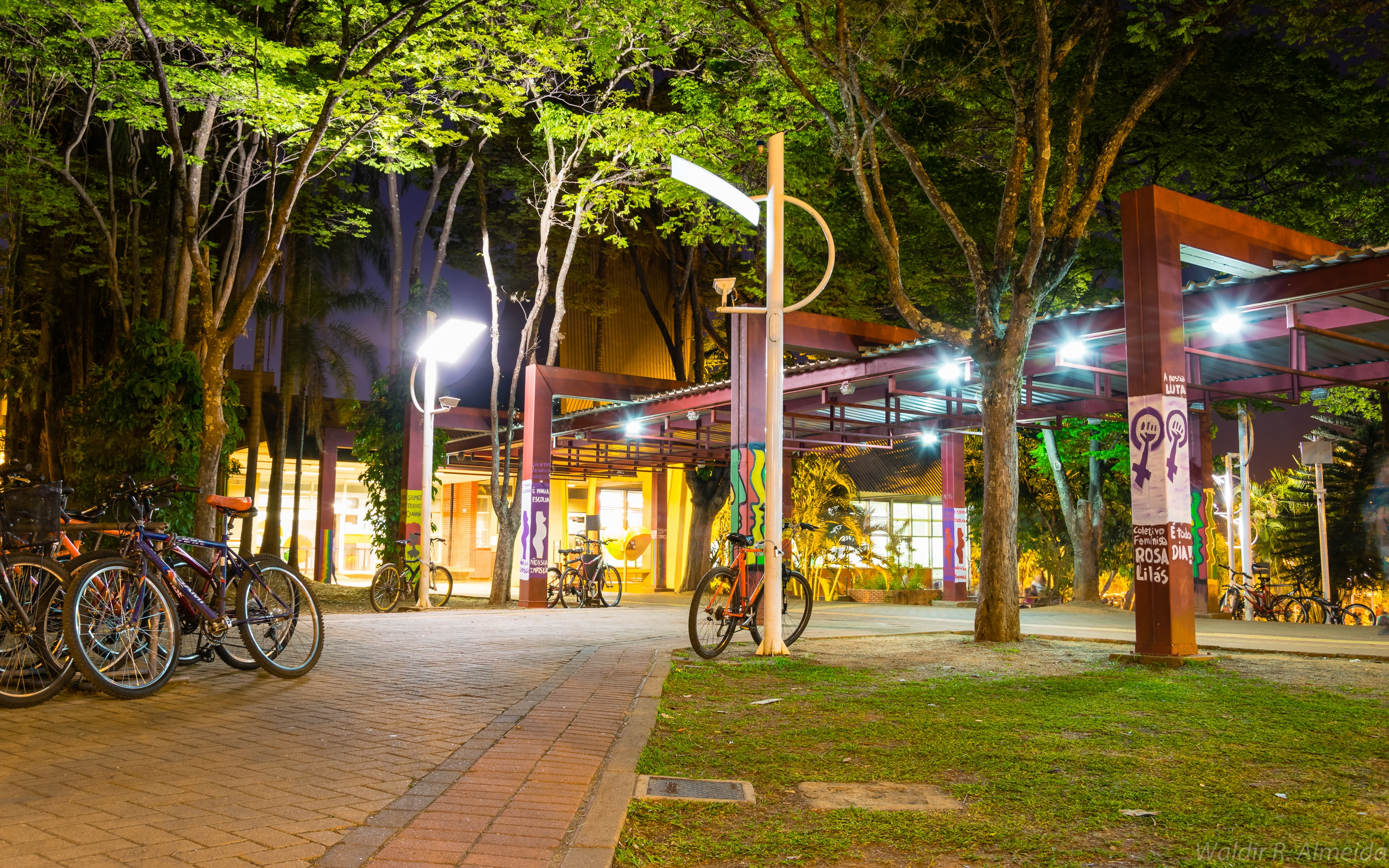
Entrance to the main university restaurant

There are multiple restaurants operated and subsidized by the university serving only the academic community. Commonly called bandejão ("large tray" in Portuguese) due to the metal trays used to serve the students, the restaurants provide up to three meals per day, the breakfast costing R$2 for students and lunch and dinner costing R$3, a price that has only been updated once in over a decade, despite the strong inflation. The main bandejão is located near the center of the circular campus, receiving students from all different areas of the university and acting as the informal social heart of the university where events, parties and political campaigns are announced to the students.

The restaurants at the university are staffed with nutritionists and food engineers, often students at the university, offering balanced menu that meets the nutritional needs of the university population, serving over 10 thousand meals per day at the main campus. The menu usually consists of rice and beans, a traditional staple food in Brazil, a type of meat (chicken, beef, sausage, pork, etc.), textured soy protein for vegetarians, salad, juice, and dessert.

There are three such restaurants on the main campus, with two additional restaurants located in the Limeira and Piracicaba campuses. Access is restricted to those who have a university-issued smart card ID, which is also used to pay for the food. In addition to the subsidized restaurants, there are several smaller, privately run restaurants across the campus and many more located in Barão Geraldo, often just a short walk away from the campus.

=== Athletics ===
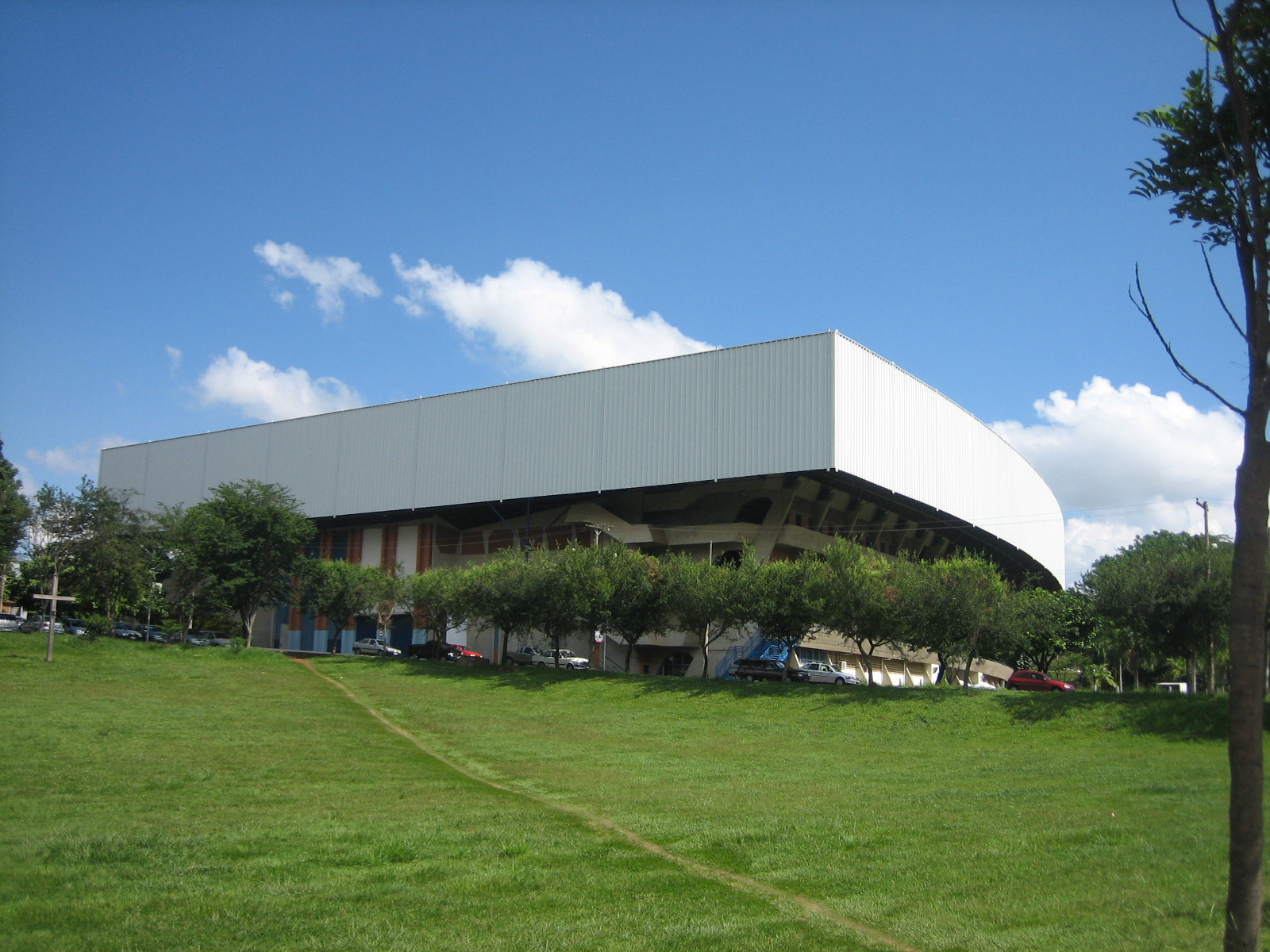
Sports arena and convention center

There are no university-sponsored athletic programs at Unicamp, and sporting competitions, either internal or played with other schools, are entirely organized by the students. The Liga das Atléticas da Unicamp, a university-wide league of the different athletic associations, is responsible for organizing internal sporting events, such as the Unicamp Olympics.

In addition to internal competitions, there are multiple external competitions between several universities focused on different areas of study: in the Intermed medical students from different universities compete against each other, and in the Engenharíadas, engineering students gather to play sports. The games are usually held in the city of one of the participating universities over a long weekend, with students being housed in public schools, farms and hotels.

The university has a sports center with courts for basketball, volleyball, a full size regulation football field, an athletics field with running tracks, a competition swimming pool, a covered gymnasium for indoor spectator sports, attached to a convention center.

== In popular culture ==
=== Varginha incident ===
Unicamp is generally regarded by the Brazilian population as Brazil's Area 51, with the government running a secret underground area purportedly called Pavilion 18, located under the Institute of Chemistry. In 1996 there were reports of an extraterrestrial sighting in the city of Varginha, commonly called the Varginha Incident, followed by additional reports of military intervention in the region and that the extraterrestrial would have been taken to the secret Pavilion 18 area at Unicamp.

== See also ==
- Brazil University Rankings
- List of state universities in Brazil
- São Paulo State University (UNESP)
- Technological Institute of Aeronautics (ITA)
- Universidade Federal do ABC (UFABC)
- University of São Paulo (USP)
- Universities and Higher Education in Brazil
