= Vandœuvre-lès-Nancy =

- Commune
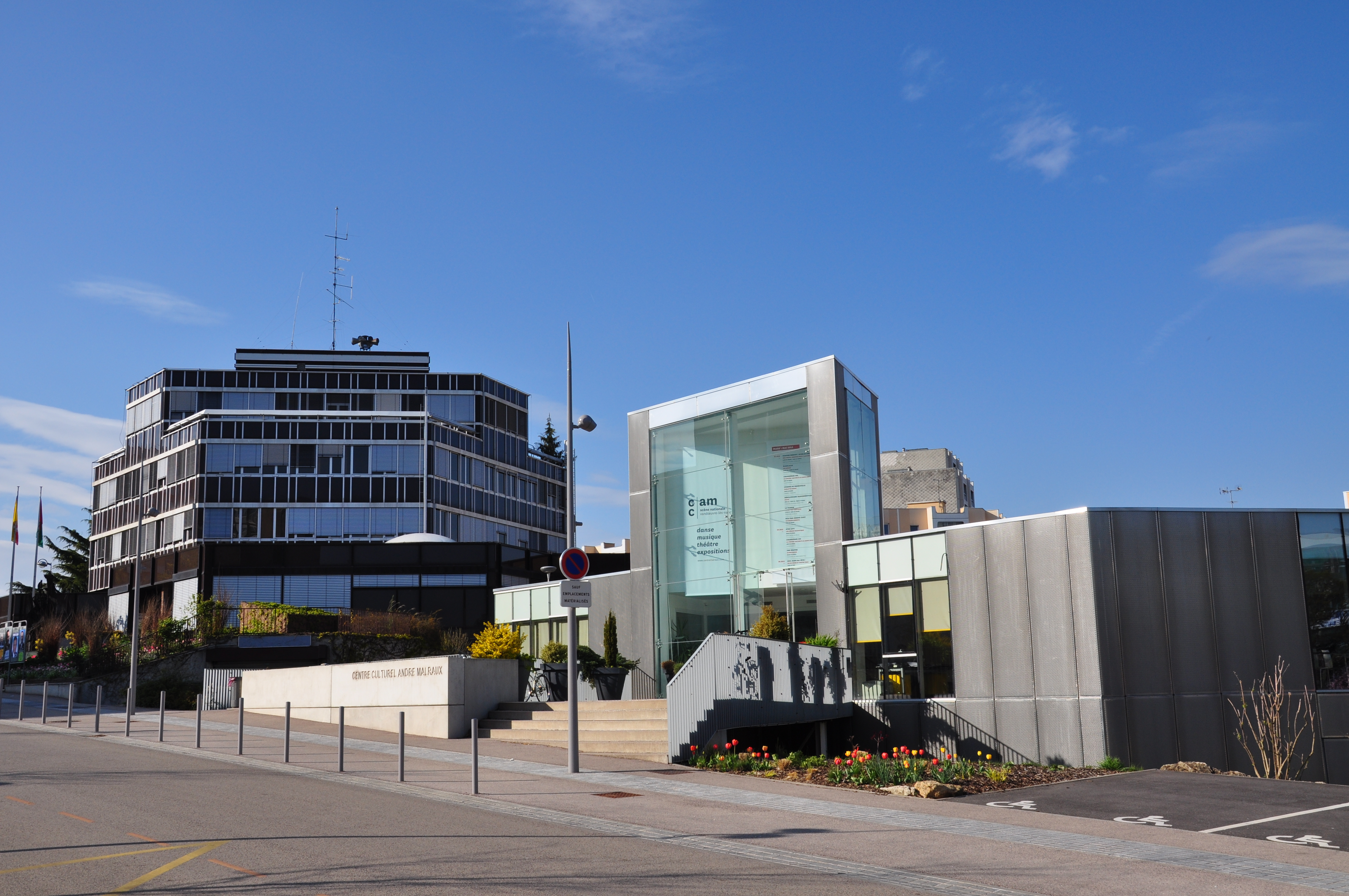
- The André Malraux cultural center in the foreground and the Hôtel de Ville at the back

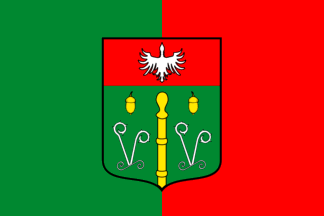
- Flag Coat of arms
- Location of Vandœuvre-lès-Nancy
- Location within France Location within Grand Est
- Coordinates: 48°39′24″N 6°10′06″E
- Country: France
- Region: Grand Est
- Department: Meurthe-et-Moselle
- Arrondissement: Nancy
- Canton: Vandœuvre-lès-Nancy
- Intercommunality: Métropole du Grand Nancy

Government
  - Mayor (2024–2026): Patrice Donati
- Area^{1}: 9.46 km^{2} (3.65 sq mi)
- Highest elevation: 402 m (1,319 ft)
- Lowest elevation: 214 m (702 ft)
- Population (2023): 29,942
  - Density: 3,170/km^{2} (8,200/sq mi)
- Time zone: UTC+01:00 (CET)
  - Summer (DST): UTC+02:00 (CEST)
- INSEE/Postal code: 54547 /54500
- ^{1} French Land Register data, which excludes lakes, ponds, glaciers > 1 km^{2} (0.386 sq mi or 247 acres) and river estuaries.

Vandœuvre-lès-Nancy (French pronunciation: [vɑ̃dœvʁ lɛ nɑ̃si], literally Vandœuvre near Nancy) is a commune in the Meurthe-et-Moselle department in north-eastern France. Its inhabitants are called Vandopériens.

== History ==
The Hôtel de Ville was completed in 1980.

== Geography ==
With 29,697 inhabitants (2022), Vandœuvre is the second-largest commune in the Meurthe-et-Moselle department, after the capital Nancy, of which it is a suburb. These two cities belong to the same agglomeration community: Métropole du Grand Nancy.

== Population ==
Historical population

Year	Pop.	±% p.a.
1793	572	—
1800	602	+0.73%
1806	648	+1.23%
1821	688	+0.40%
1831	682	−0.09%
1836	821	+3.78%
1841	890	+1.63%
1846	970	+1.74%
1851	976	+0.12%
1856	953	−0.48%
1861	995	+0.87%
1872	1,136	+1.21%
1876	1,247	+2.36%
1881	1,327	+1.25%
1886	1,301	−0.39%
1891	1,959	+8.53%
1896	2,110	+1.50%
1901	2,232	+1.13%

Year	Pop.	±% p.a.
1906	2,598	+3.08%
1911	2,867	+1.99%
1921	2,653	−0.77%
1926	3,519	+5.81%
1931	3,942	+2.30%
1936	4,645	+3.34%
1946	5,308	+1.34%
1954	6,466	+2.50%
1962	11,559	+7.53%
1968	19,686	+9.28%
1975	33,909	+8.08%
1982	33,682	−0.10%
1990	34,105	+0.16%
1999	32,048	−0.69%
2007	31,196	−0.34%
2012	30,569	−0.41%
2017	30,002	−0.37%
2023	29,942	−0.03%

Source: EHESS and INSEE (1968-2023)

== Municipal market ==
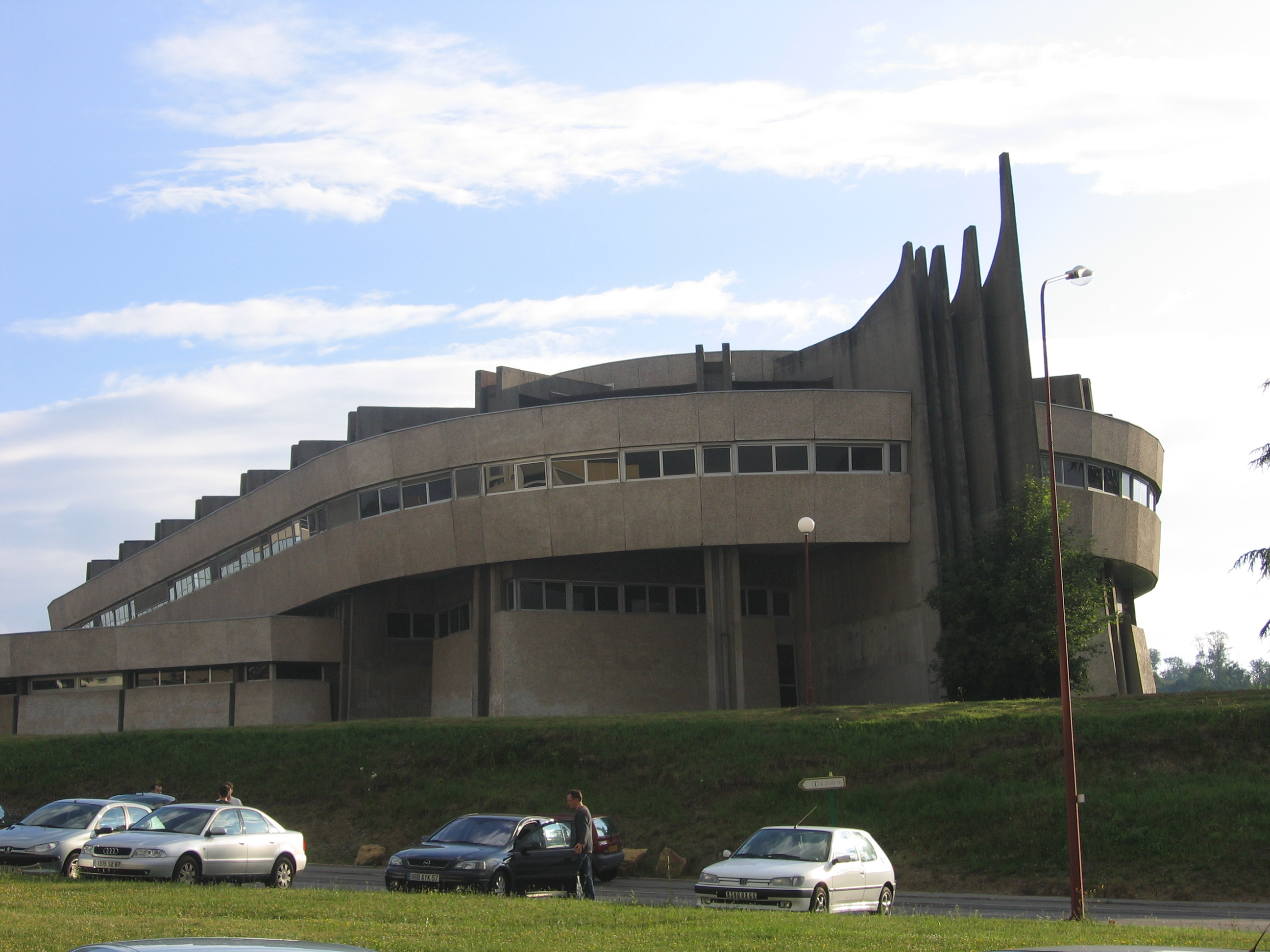
A building of Henri Poincaré University in Vandœuvre-lès-Nancy

The municipal market of Vandœuvre hosts 120–150 merchants and 6,000–8,000 visitors on Sunday mornings. An organic market is active on Friday evenings.

== Twin towns – sister cities ==
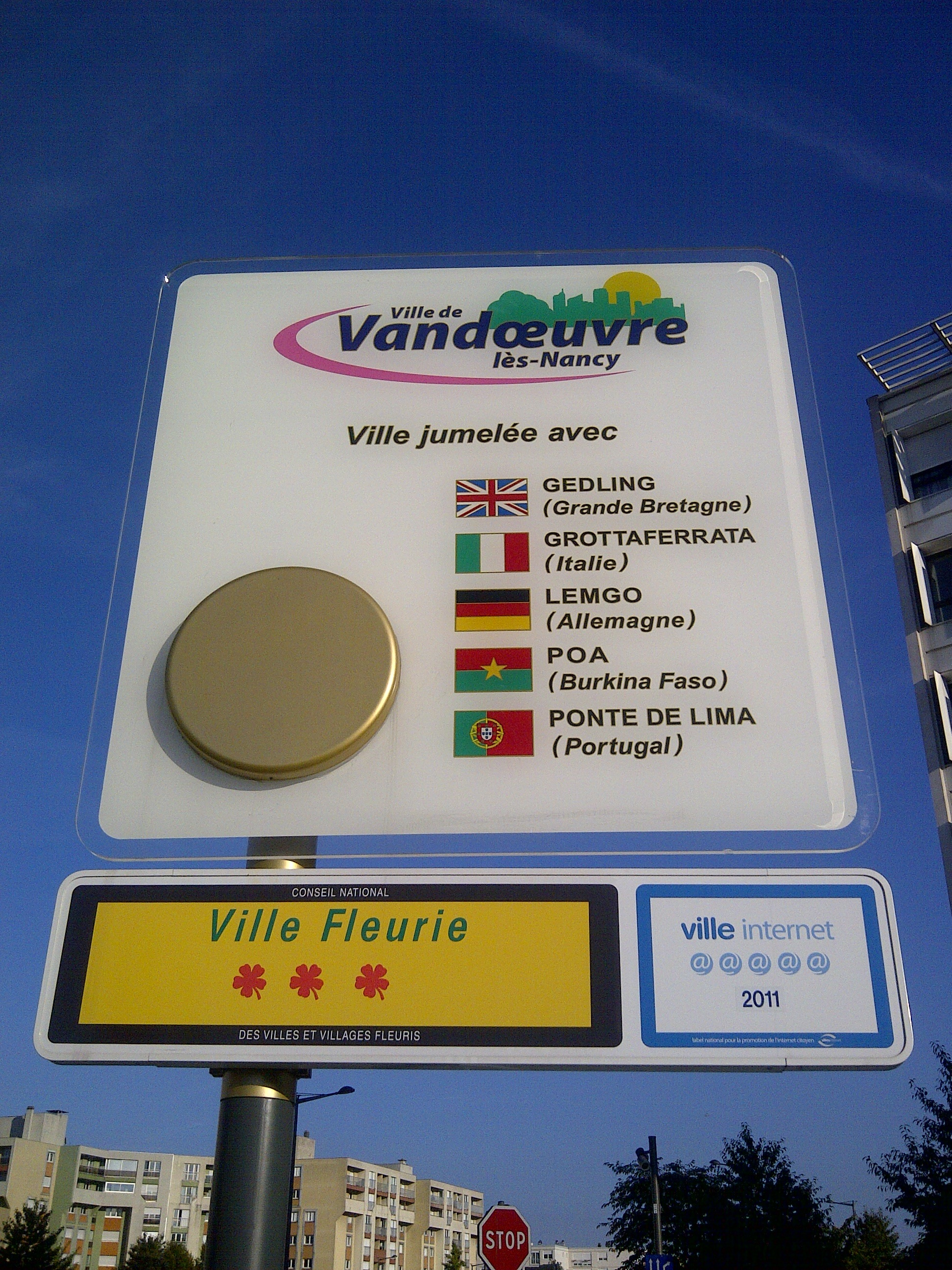
A sign with the twin towns

Vandœuvre-lès-Nancy is twinned with:

- Gedling, England, United Kingdom
- Grottaferrata, Italy
- Lemgo, Germany
- Poa, Burkina Faso
- Ponte de Lima, Portugal

== Universities and colleges ==
Vandoeuvre has institutions of higher learning:

- University of Lorraine which merges:
  - Henri Poincaré University (Université Henri Poincaré, UHP, also known as Nancy 1)
  - National Polytechnic Institute of Lorraine (Institut National Polytechnique de Lorraine or INPL)
    - École nationale supérieure d'agronomie et des industries alimentaires (ENSAIA)
    - École nationale supérieure de géologie (ENSG)
    - École Polytechnique de l'Université de Lorraine (Polytech Nancy)
- Faculté de médecine (Medical School)
- Faculté d'odontologie de Lorraine
- Ecole nationale supérieure d'électricité et de mécanique
- Ecole de puériculture

== See also ==
- École Nationale Supérieure d'Agronomie et des Industries Alimentaires
- École Supérieure des Sciences et Technologies de l'Ingénieur de Nancy
- INIST (CNRS database)
- Communes of the Meurthe-et-Moselle department
