= National Polytechnic Institute of Lorraine =

Coordinates: 48°39′08″N 6°08′53″E

- Institut National Polytechnique de Lorraine
- Type: Public
- Established: 1969; 57 years ago
- Affiliations: University of Lorraine
- President: François Laurent
- Students: 4000
- Location: Nancy, Lorraine, France
- Website: www.lorraine-inp.fr

National Polytechnic Institute of Lorraine (French: Institut National Polytechnique de Lorraine [ɛ̃stity nɑsjɔnal pɔlitɛknik də lɔʁɛn]; abbr. Lorraine INP) is a French technological university system, based in Nancy. It is under the Academy of Nancy and Metz.

== Formation ==
INPL is a part of the University of Lorraine. It federates 11 engineering schools:

- École nationale supérieure des mines de Nancy: general engineering
- École Nationale Supérieure des Industries Chimiques (ENSIC, Nancy): chemical engineering
- École nationale supérieure d'agronomie et des industries alimentaires (ENSAIA): agricultural engineering
- École européenne d'ingénieurs en génie des matériaux (EEIGM)
- École nationale supérieure d'électricité et de mécanique (ENSEM)
- École Nationale Supérieure de Géologie (ENSG)
- École nationale supérieure en génie des systèmes et de l'innovation (ENSGSI)
- École nationale d'ingénieurs de Metz (ENIM)
- Polytech Nancy
- Telecom Nancy
- École Nationale Supérieure des Technologies et Industries du Bois
