= University of Campinas School of Mechanical Engineering =

Faculdade de Engenharia Mecânica da Unicamp
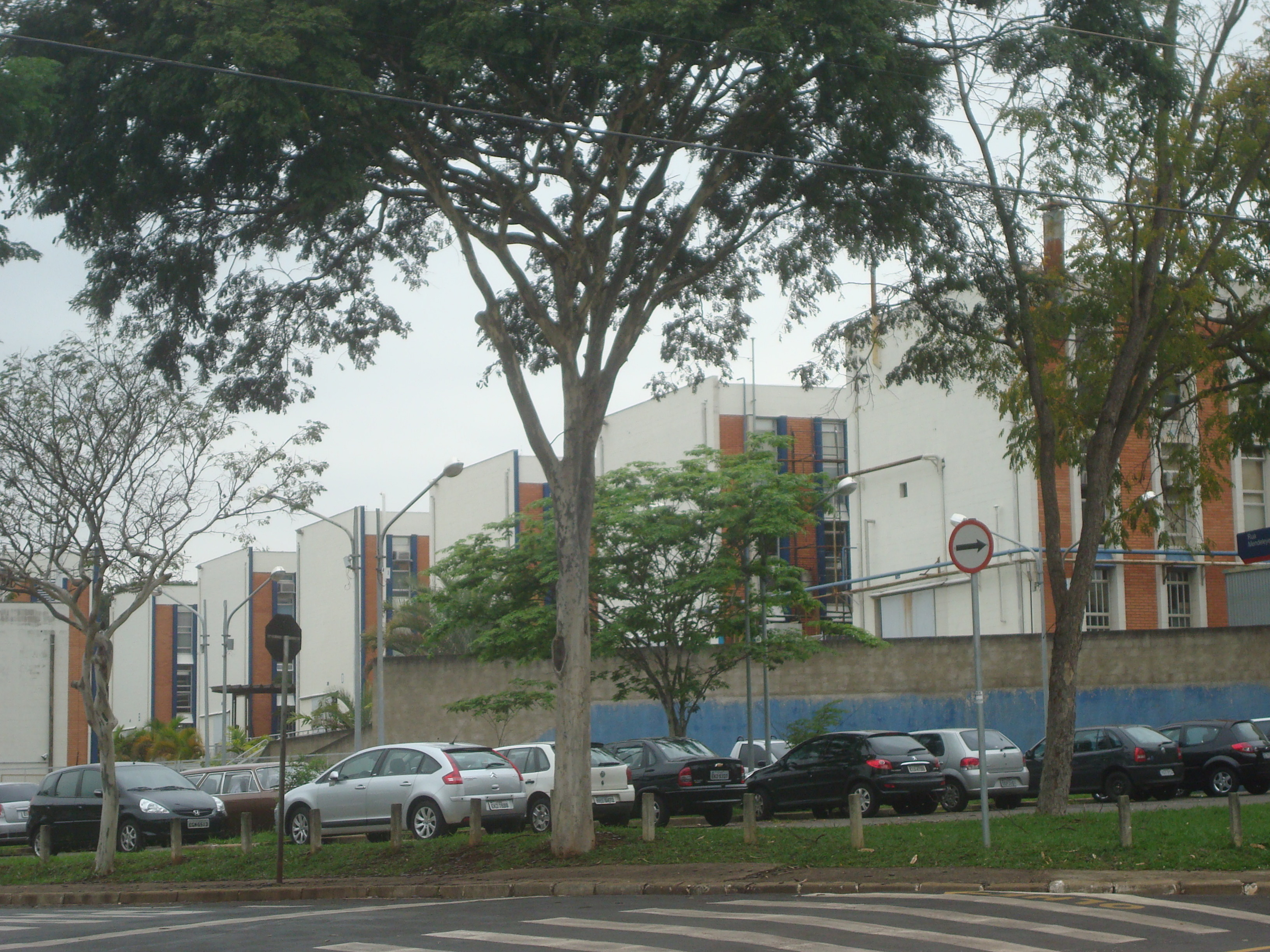
- "FEM main entrance"
- Type: Public
- Established: 1967
- Location: Campinas, São Paulo State, Brazil; 22°49′9″S 47°3′56″W
- Campus: Urban
- Website: www.fem.unicamp.br

The School of Mechanical Engineering (Portuguese: Faculdade de Engenharia Mecânica, FEM) is one of the colleges at the State University of Campinas in Campinas, São Paulo, Brazil. It offers undergraduate and graduate programs in mechanical engineering and mechatronics. FEM is one of the most highly regarded schools for mechanical engineering and mechatronics in both Brazil and Latin America, as well being ranked the highest on the CAPES evaluation.

== History ==
The Mechanical Engineering at UNICAMP began in 1967 with the creation of the Department of Mechanical Engineering FEC - Faculty of Engineering Campinas. Although the FEC had Departments of Electrical Engineering and Chemical Engineering. The Faculty of Mechanical Engineering (FEM) was established in 1989 through the dismemberment of FEC and occupies currently a building area of 14,207 m2 and 10,322 m2 of floor space distributed among departments, coordinators, laboratories, administrative areas, classrooms, of pupils and teachers. Approximately 40 laboratories are allocated to different departments and coordination. It currently has seven departments, two undergraduate degrees, three postgraduate coordinators and school extension /specialization.

== Departments ==
FEM has seven departments:

=== Departamento de Energia - DE ===
(Department of Energy) The Department of Energy - DE develops activities of undergraduate education, graduate and extension, research, consultancy and provision of community services, including design and development of equipment, in the area of energy, including heat transfer, fluid mechanics, thermodynamics and energy planning. The DE is distinguished for several years, in the setting of national institutions, the interdisciplinarity of its activities, a characteristic now recognized as vital in engineering.

=== Departamento de Engenharia de Fabricação - DEF ===
(Department of Manufacturing Engineering) The Department of Manufacturing Engineering (DEF) is dedicated to researching manufacturing systems, manufacturing automation and management, casting and solidification of metals, welding of metals, machining technology, composite materials, monitoring of machining processes and metrology.

=== Departamento de Engenharia de Petróleo - DEP ===
(Department of Petroleum engineering) The Department of Petroleum Engineering (DEP) was created in 1987, when it started the MSc program in Petroleum Engineering, the result of scientific cooperation agreement signed between Petrobras and Unicamp. Since its inception, the department has been involved with the following activities: Teaching, Research and Extension.

=== Departamento de Engenharia de Materiais - DEMA ===
(Department of Material Engineering) In 1975 it was formed in the former Department of Mechanical Engineering, Faculty of Engineering Campinas, a research group to conduct activities related to the study of materials and manufacturing processes. Were initially established agreements that allowed the installation of laboratories, training of personnel and development of scientific research. In 1985, five Divisions were created in the Department of Mechanical Engineering, and was one of the Divisions of Materials Engineering. In July 1987 he was created, from the Division of Materials Engineering, Department of Materials Engineering.

DEMA has currently laboratories in and researches in biomechanics (Labiomec), physical metallurgy and solidification, mechanics conformation, electrochemical engineering, degradation of materials and development of coatings, electron beam melting and thermomechanical treatments and solidification.

=== Departamento de Engenharia Térmica e de Fluidos - DETF ===
Department of Thermal and Fluid Engineering) The Department of Thermal Engineering and Fluid (DETF) conducts research and provides community support in the areas of basic and applied multiphase flows, combustion, and pollution control, thermal control, environmental, generation, transfer and storage of equipment and processes involving heat . The DETF was created with the restructuring of the FEC - Faculty of Engineering Campinas since 1987 and brings together teachers working within the area of Mechanical Engineering at UNICAMP since 1971.

=== Departamento de Projeto Mecânico - DPM ===
(Department of Mechanical Design/Project) The Department of Mechanical Design (DPM) currently has 14 teachers, including 12 under the dedication (RDIDP), 01 under a full shift (RTC) and 01 partial shift in regime (RTP), 10 technical and administrative staff .

Researchers that make up the Department of Mechanical Design (MPD) are involved with activities in the areas of undergraduate education (courses of Mechanical Engineering and Automation and Control Engineering) and postgraduate, research, and technical and scientific advice to the community.

=== Departamento de Mecânica Computacional - DMC ===
(Department of Computational mechanics) Founded in 1988, the Department of Computational Mechanics (DMC) is a group of researchers dedicated to the solution of engineering problems working in the areas of teaching, research and outreach to the community through: Computer simulation of problems of mechanics and mechatronics. Experimental evidence of the phenomena studied. Development of predictive techniques and control systems based on the investigation of physical models. The DMC currently has a faculty of eleven full-time teachers, all with the title of Doctor obtained in prestigious institutions in the country and abroad. We add on average about seventy people between researchers, graduate students, undergraduates, secretaries and technicians working in consultancy work, postdoctoral, doctoral, master's, and undergraduate research internship.

== Agreements and cooperations ==
The FEM works in undergraduate, postgraduate, research, extension education and service agreements and cooperation with foreign industries and other institutions in the country and abroad. The research projects are the result of the initiative of teaching or research groups, through funding from development agencies such as FAPESP, CNPq, FINEP and others. The cooperation agreements contemplate the transfer of technology in applied areas such as materials technology, industrial automation, manufacturing management, failure analysis, energy studies, space industry, lamination steels, mechanical tests, machinery and equipment, bio-mechanical prostheses, maintenance procedures, manufacturing processes, thermal and fluids, vibrations and noise. Some companies and institutions may be cited are Alcan, Eletrobras, Vale, General Motors, Mercedes-Benz, Brazilian Army, US Air Force and other institutions and industries can be seen on FEM website. FEM also have agreements and sponsorship with other industries and corporations like Schaeffler Group that also sponsors extracurricular projects.

== Motriz Junior enterprise ==
In 1992, inspired by MEJ, was created Motriz - Junior Enterprise of the Faculty of Mechanical Engineering. The Motriz is a nonprofit civil association that aims to optimize productivity and contribute in resolutions to problems in Mechanical Engineering. With the help of teachers of the University, the company makes high quality consulting services at affordable prices. Given its proactivity, provides university-company approach to both its members and the student body, with the organization of events such as the Week of Mechanical Engineering at UNICAMP.

Members, who are exclusively students from first to fourth year of graduation, have the opportunity to better prepare for the job market, dealing with problems and solutions that contribute to its growth.

To develop commercial projects, the company's flagship product, the motive has a management system defined in 5 Processes (see page process) managed by the Executive Board (composed of a Director of each process, one CEO, a Vice President and Board). In September 2010 the Motriz concluded its very successful recertification of ISO 9001:2008, this time with the BSI, extending its validity for a further 3 years.

== Mecatron ==
The Mecatron Projects and Consulting Junior is the Junior Enterpriseof course control engineering and automation (mechatronics) at UNICAMP. Formed only by undergraduates, the Mecatron carries out projects in the field of control and automation affordable, helping the development of micro and small enterprises in the region.

Mecatron provides services primarily to small businesses, offering low costs and thus increasing their competitiveness. Its coverage area can be divided into the following sectors: Programming supervisory software Programming of PLCs Systems Integration Electronic Systems Software development control

== Extracurricular Projects ==
In Unicamp are projects of students groups involving competitions with other Universities in the world. The projects are developed in FEM, but with the participation of students from other courses like electrical, chemical and computer engineering. Some projects are:

- Urubus Aerodesign (Aerodesign and aeromodelling)
- FSAE (Formula SAE)
- Projeto Mini-Baja (Car competition)
- Projeto Eco-Car (EcoCAR)
- Projeto Grenu (Rowing and Naval Studies)
- Equipe Phoenix (Team of Robot competition)

== Alumni Associations ==
- AAAMEC (Athletic of Mechanical Engineering)
- AAAECA (Academic Athletic Association of Automation and Control Engineering)
- ALUMNI (Portal alumni UNICAMP)
- CAEMM (Academic Center of Mechanical Engineering and Mechatronics)

== See also ==
- University of Campinas (Unicamp)
- Escola Politécnica da Universidade de São Paulo
- Instituto Tecnológico de Aeronáutica
- Mechanical engineering
