= School of Nancy =

The School of Nancy may refer to:

- Nancy School a school of hypnosis and psychotherapy, a.k.a. "The Suggestion School"
- École de Nancy a stream of Art Nouveau
- École Nationale Supérieure de Géologie the Nancy School of Geology
