= Sausse =

Sausse or Saussé are surnames. Notable people with the surname include:

- Anicet Saussé (born 1969), French footballer
- Honoré Sausse (1891–1936), French art deco sculptor
- Judith Sausse, French geophysicist
- Matthew Richard Sausse (1809–1867), Irish barrister
