= École européenne d'ingénieurs en génie des matériaux =

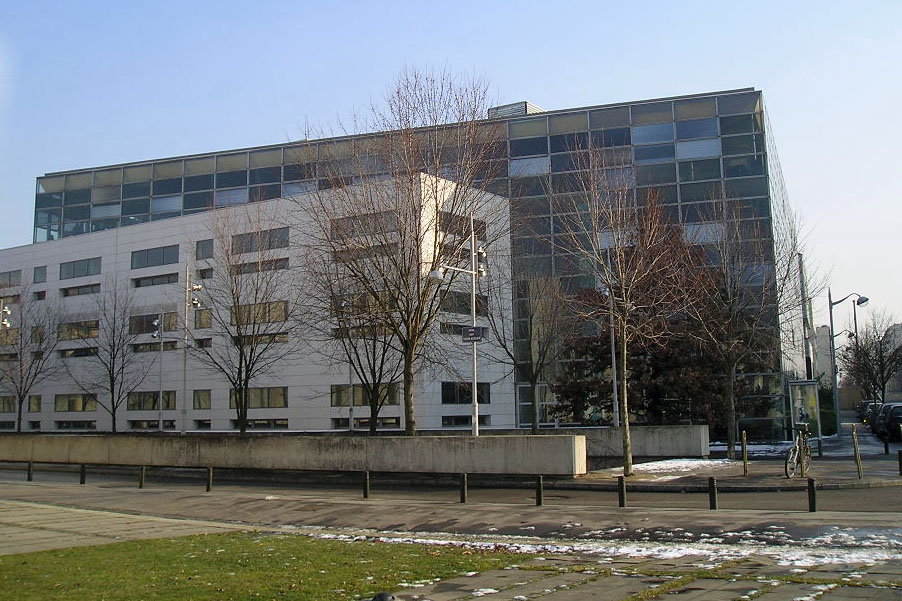
- Type: Public
- Established: 1991
- Affiliations: University of Lorraine
- Students: 400
- Location: Nancy, France; 48.6954°N 6.1930°E
- Website: eeigm.univ-lorraine.fr

The École Européenne d'Ingénieurs en Génie des Matériaux (French pronunciation: [ekɔl øʁɔpeɛn dɛ̃ʒenjœʁ ɑ̃ ʒeni de mateʁjo], EEIGM) is a French engineering College created in 1991.

The EEIGM trains 90 materials engineers every year. All students study the main groups of materials, which are metals and alloys, polymers, ceramics and composites.

Located in Nancy, the EEIGM is a public higher education institution. The school is a member of the University of Lorraine and the National Polytechnic Institute of Lorraine. It also is a member of a consortium of European universities in which students get to travel through Erasmus programs.

== Training ==
The EEIGM training lasts 5 years. To be admitted, one needs to pass the Geipi Polytech examination, after having done a scientific baccalaureate. The engineering curriculum can be attended to in two ways:

- with the "classic" option, following the first two years, also accessible through the common competition of the National Polytechnic institutes (programs MP, PC, PSI) with specific oral exams, the "Prépa des INP" or via an admission based on qualifications after DUT, CPGE ATS, DUETI, or License 3;
- or through the "apprentice" option accessible by application followed by specific oral exams for students 2 years after obtaining the baccalaureate. One of the unique features of these options is that they award the same degree.

The traditional engineering cycle (three years) consists of three semesters in Nancy, followed by at least two of the next three semesters in the countries of the partner universities. The partner universities are:

- University of Lorraine, France
- Polytechnic University of Catalonia, Spain
- Saarland University, Germany
- Luleå University of Technology, Sweden
- Technical University of Valencia, Spain
- Université Libre de Bruxelles, Belgium
- University of Leoben, Austria

Agreements also exist with:

- Kyushu Institute of Technology, Japan
- Universidade de Caxias do Sul and Polytechnic School of the University of São Paulo, Brazil
- École Nationale Supérieure des Mines de Rabat (Mines Rabat) and the Cadi Ayyad University, Morocco

Double diplomas curriculums can be validated by staying three semesters in a partner university.

The following disciplines are taught at EEIGM: fundamental sciences (mathematics, physics, mechanics, chemistry, and computer science), languages (English, German, Spanish, and French for international students), materials science (development, properties, recycling...), and business skills (management, quality control, project management, financial management, business project). These disciplines enable the research, development, production, characterization, and control of traditional and new materials, and end-of-life treatment, including recycling.

In partnership with the Institut d'Administration des Entreprises (IAE) of Nancy, the EEIGM offers students a double degree delivering a master in management and business administration and master in entrepreneurship and business development. Since 2016, students can also obtain a double degree, delivering a master in Project Management with the University of Quebec at Chicoutimi (UQAC).

== Specialisations ==
In their 4th year, students have a choice between 3 specialisations:

- materials for transport and modes of transport
- materials for the energy sector
- materials for the health sector

== International openness ==
With its many partnerships, the EEIGM has a strong international outlook. During their studies, students spend more than a year abroad.

Three compulsory foreign languages are taught to all students: English, German and Spanish, as well as French for foreign students. All students undertake several international internships during the summer holidays, including one in an English-speaking country and one in a Spanish- or German-speaking country.

To obtain the school's engineering degree, students must obtain two certificates (of which English is compulsory) attesting to a minimum B2 level of language proficiency (First Certificate in English, Goethe Zertfikat B2, Diploma de Espanol como Lengua Extranjera (DELE) B2). Students then spend a semester in one of the partner universities in 4th year.

In 5th year, students complete a six-month research internship in one of the universities (in Nancy or abroad), followed by a six-month industrial one. One of these must be outside France.

Finally, the EEIGM has two industrial partners with whom it has particularly close links, as students can carry out internships with specific agreements. These partners are the European Space Agency (ESA) in Cologne (Germany), Airbus in Bremen (Germany), Ceratizit, Institut de Soudure, IRT M2P, Riva and ABS.

According to L'Étudiant 2022 journal's ranking of engineering schools, the EEIGM is ranked 1st for international openness among engineering schools which training is in 5 years, which is a result also obtained with the ranking from the 2024 L'Usine Nouvelle journal.

== Class mentoring ==
Since 1996 (first class of the EEIGM school), each class has one (or more) mentor(s).

Promotion	Parrain(s)	Activité
2023	Fabrice Wavelet	Deputy Technical Director, Ferry-Capitain
2022	Abdelkrim Chehaibou	Managing Director, Institut de Soudure
2021	Lennart Wallström	Former Head of the Materials Science Division, Luleå University of Technology
2020	Arnaud Villemiane	Managing Director, ALPHATEST, EEIGM graduate
2019	Sofia Sauvageot-Börgesson	EEIGM graduate (class of 1999), 1st Vice President, Global Account Executive & Industry Network Leader Utilities – ABB
2018	Frédéric Thrum	Chairman of Fives Cryongenics Energy
2017	Valérie Lamacq	General Electric Company, Executive – Plant Management
2016	Thierry Merlot	Chairman of Hexcel Composites
2015	Sylvain Allano	Director of Science and Future Technologies, PSA Peugeot Citroën
2014	Stéphane Vitrac (Promotion EEIGM 1997)	EEIGM graduate (class of 1997), Director of the Actuators Industrial Centre of Excellence, Sagem DS, Safran Group
2013	Jean-Stéphane Didier	Deputy Managing Director, Thomas Vale Construction, Bouygues UK Company
2012	Pascale Fournier	Head of Integrator program and industrialization for materials and processes, Airbus
2011	Michel Gantois Gérard Metauer Torbjörn Hedberg Alain Degiovanni Jean Steinmetz	Founder of the EEIGM school Provisional Administrator of the EEIGM in 1991 Director of the EEIGM in 1994 Director of the EEIGM in 1998 Director of the EEIGM in 2003
2010	Greg Ludovsky	Vice President Global R&D, ArcelorMittal
2009	Ernest Totino	Chairman of the Management Board, MERSEN
2008	François Dujardin	CEO, Saint-Gobain Desjonquières
2007	Clemens Bockenheimer	Airbus Materials & Processes (SHM and NDT)
2006	Claude Imauven	Executive Vice-President of Saint-Gobain, Director of the Construction Products Sector
2005	Michel Gantois	Founder of the School, former President of the National Polytechnic Institute of Lorraine (INPL)
2004	Gérard Lotzer	Director, Cristalleries de Baccarat
2003	Serge Dassault	Director, Dassault Aviation
2002	Catherine Langlais	Director, Saint-Gobain Recherche
2001	Olivier Gronier	Sales Network Director, EDF
2000	Philippe Boulanger	Physicist, Editorial Director, Pour la Science
1999	Jean Daum	CEO, Usinor
1998	Leïf Johansson	CEO of Electrolux and Volvo, member of the board of AstraZeneca
1997	Patrick Baudry	French astronaut
1996	Pierre-Gilles de Gennes	Physicist, Nobel Prize in Physics in 1991

== Student life ==
As well as teaching, students have access to a wide range of sporting and cultural activities through the Student Office (Bureau des Étudiants, BDE).

The EEIGM also takes part in events such as the 24h de Stan, which brings together thousands of students from Lorraine every year.

Since 2006, the school has also been supporting a Junior Enterprise, EEIGM Etudes et Services. The latter offers services in materials selection, statistical studies, bibliographic studies, technical translations and materials characterisation and links outside companies or individuals with students of the school, who are responsible for carrying out the studies.

== Notable alumni ==
- Matthias Maurer, German European Space Agency astronaut and materials scientist
