= Badreddine Assouar =

French physicist (born 1974)

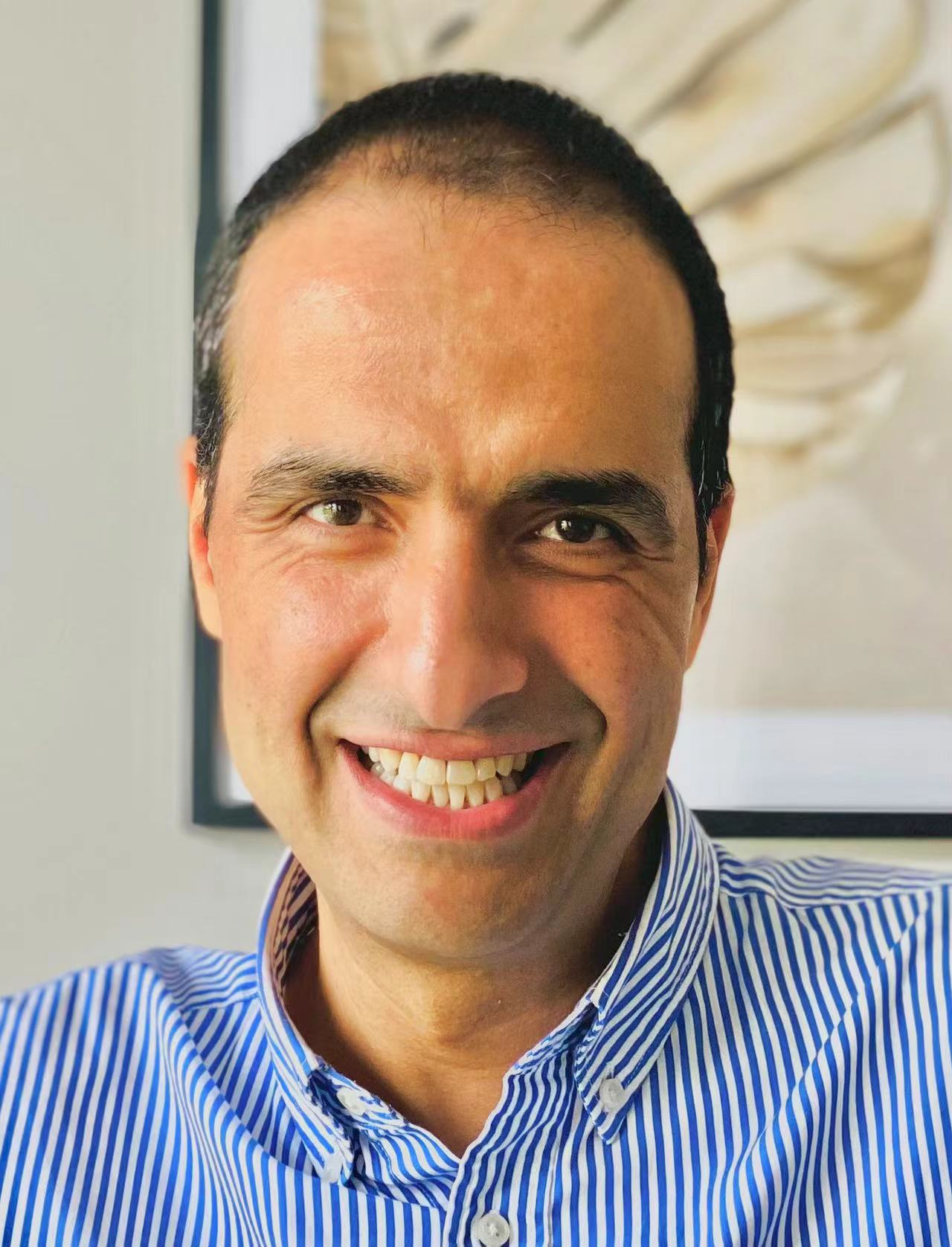
- Badreddine Assouar (2022)
- Born: 5 May 1974 (age 52)
- Occupation: Physicist

Academic background
- Education: University of Lorraine
- Thesis: Etude de dispositifs à ondes acoustiques de surface (SAW) à structure multicouche nitrure d'aluminium diamant : croissance de matériaux en couches minces et technologie de réalisation (2001)

Badreddine Assouar (born May 5, 1974) is a physicist, currently director of research at CNRS and the University of Lorraine in France. His research focuses on metamaterials, metasurfaces, phononic crystals and surface acoustic wave devices. He is the Chief Editor of APS Open Science (American Physical Society).

== Career ==
Badreddine Assouar received his master's degree in 1998, his PhD in 2001 and his Habilitation to Supervise Research in 2007 from the University of Lorraine in France. After a postdoctoral fellowship, he entered to the French National Center of Scientific Research (CNRS) in 2002. From 2010 to 2012, he joined the Georgia Institute of Technology in Atlanta as a visiting professor in the international research unit (CNRS – Georgia Tech). In 2020, he became Director of Research at CNRS. He is the founder and the head of the “Metamaterials and Phononics” group at the Institut Jean Lamour (CNRS-University of Lorraine).

== Honors and awards ==
In 2009, he received the first research prize from the Lorraine region. In 2013, he won the Award of Scientific Excellence from CNRS. In 2024, he has been elected a Fellow of the European Academy of Sciences (EurASc). He was named Chief Editor of APS Open Science (https://journals.aps.org/apsos/), the newest journal of APS, in December 2025. He has been elected Fellow of the American Physical Society (APS) in 2026.
