= HEVT =

Hybrid Electric Vehicle Team of Virginia Tech (2007)

The Hokie Electric Vehicle Team of Virginia Tech, better known as HEVT, is a nationally recognized undergraduate student design team in the Department of Mechanical Engineering at Virginia Tech. HEVT was formed in 1994 to compete in the 1995 Hybrid Electric Vehicle (HEV) Challenge, one of the many competitions organized by the Argonne National Laboratory through the United States Department of Energy. HEVT has been involved in the Department of Energy Advanced Vehicle Technology Competitions (AVTCs) ever since. HEVT attributes a significant amount of its success to their Advisor, Professor Doug Nelson in Mechanical Engineering. Dr. Nelson has received the Outstanding Faculty Advisor award at competition 3 times. He has greatly aided the education of students at Virginia Tech and helped the team succeed at competition The overall highlights of past competitions are as follows:

Competition	Overall Place
'95 HEV Challenge	Fifth
'96 FutureCar Challenge	First
'97 FutureCar Challenge	Second
'98 FutureCar Challenge	First (tied with Wisconsin)
'99 FutureCar Challenge	Second
'00 FutureTruck Challenge	Third
'05 ChallengeX	Fourth
'06 ChallengeX	First
'07 ChallengeX	Third
'09 EcoCAR	Sixth
'10 EcoCAR	Second
'11 EcoCAR	First
'12 EcoCAR 2	Fourth
'13 EcoCAR 2	Sixth
'14 EcoCAR 3	Second
'15 EcoCAR 3	Second
'16 EcoCAR 3	Sixth

== Outreach ==
HEVT devotes time each month to community outreach, in which they provide the community with information about sustainability, hybrid technology, AVTCS and the team. Outreach events target youth, community members, influencers, other students and the media. A few of HEVT's outreach events that have occurred within the past few years include National Odyssey Day, EcoDrive, Relay for Life and Innovation under the Hood.

== Competitions ==
=== FutureCar ===
Virginia Tech's HEVT placed first in the 1996 challenge held in Detroit. In 1996 HEVT also received awards for best workmanship, most energy efficient vehicle, lowest regulated tailpipe emissions, best use of alternative fuels, and overall best dynamic handling. The 1996 vehicle was based on a 1995 Chevrolet Lumina, donated through PNGV, which utilized a General Electric electric motor, a three-cylinder Geo Metro engine, and a large battery pack. The vehicle, fueled by propane, could go 600 miles without refueling while getting between 40 and 50 mpgge (Crumbley 1996).

HEVT placed second in the 1997 competition (UW 1997).

HEVT tied with the University of Wisconsin team for first place in the 1998 FutureCar Challenge (Launey 1998). That year HEVT also won awards for best consumer acceptability, best vehicle design inspection, best acceleration, best dynamic handling, best overall engineering design, and best solo autocross (ECE News 1998).

During the 1999 FutureCar Challenge, HEVT's entry became the first vehicle during the competition series to operate as a functional hydrogen fuel cell vehicle; at the time the vehicle was considered to be one of only a handful of operable fuel cell vehicles in the world (Lypen 1999). The fuel cell used in the vehicle was provided by the U. S. Department of Defense and carried a price tag of $250,000 USD (VT Magazine 1999). This 1999 entry was based on a 1998 Chevrolet Lumina and was designed as a series hybrid operating with the hydrogen fuel cell, a custom built lead acid battery, and an AC induction motor drivetrain. HEVT placed second in the 1999 competition.

=== FutureTruck ===
After the 1999 competition series ended, the FutureCar program was replaced with the FutureTruck program. The FutureTruck program was created to address the environmental and energy related issues created by the increased demand of SUV's in the United States. Fifteen engineering schools from across North America were accepted as the participants in this five-year engineering program. The goal of the competition was to re-engineer a popular SUV to a lower emissions vehicle with an improvement of at least 25% in fuel economy. Each entrant vehicle also was required to meet safety, performance, and utility goals. Main sponsors of the FutureTruck program include the U.S. Department of Energy's Office of Efficiency and Renewable Energy, General Motors, and the Ford Motor Company. The program was managed by Argonne National Laboratory's Center for Transportation Research (FutureTruck).

HEVT had only five months to complete the conversion of their 2000 FutureTruck entry vehicle based on a stock Chevy Suburban. This entry from Virginia Tech won first place at the 2000 competition which began on June 7, 2000. The 2000 FutureTruck competition was held at the General Motors Desert Proving Grounds in Mesa, Arizona.

During the 2002 competition, HEVT was awarded the MathWorks Teamwork & Leadership Award.

During the 2003 competition, HEVT was awarded the Spirit of the Challenge Award, and also received a third place award in the National Instruments Most Innovative Use of Virtual Instrumentation category.

=== ChallengeX ===
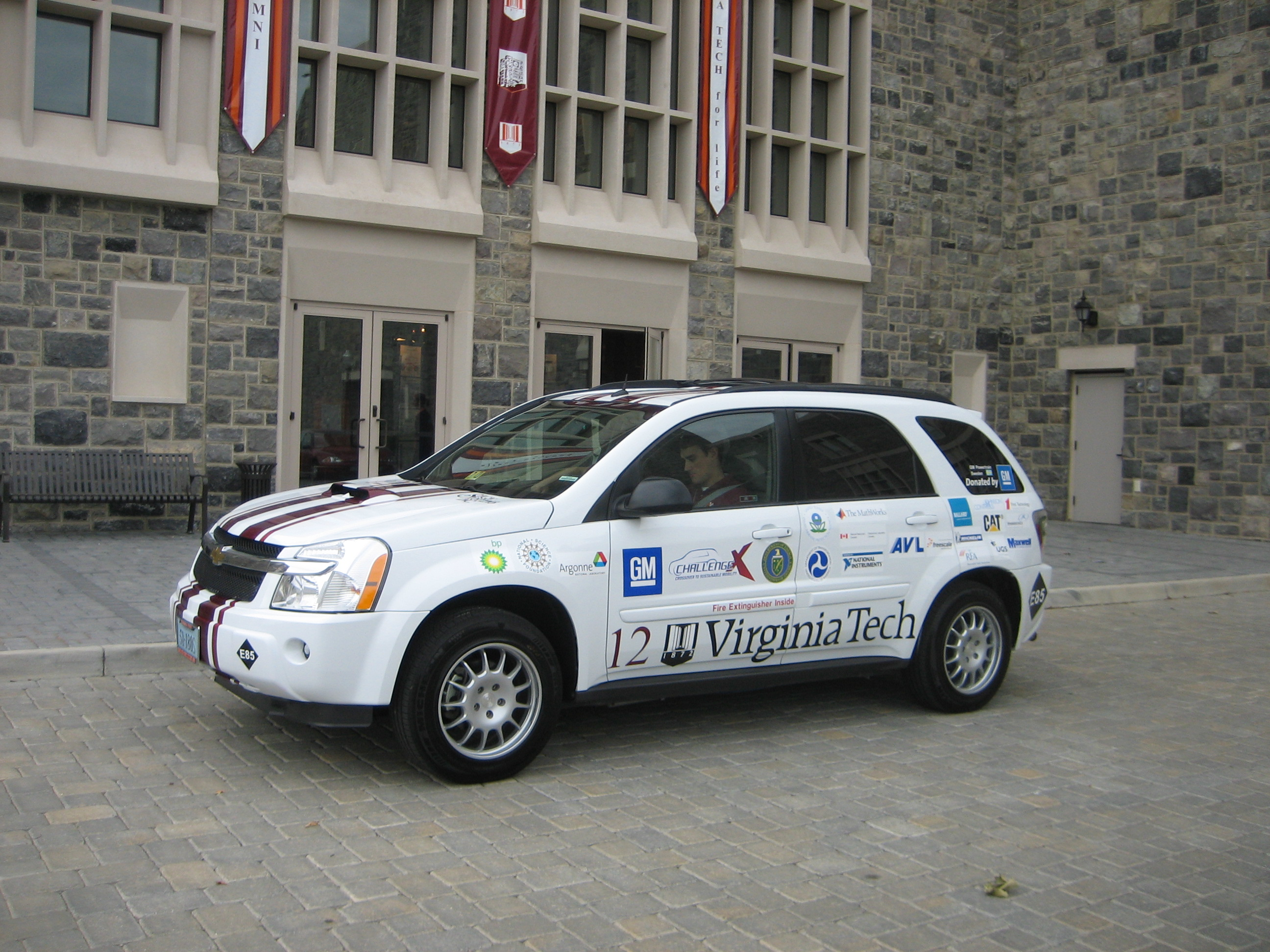
Virginia Tech's REV_{LSE}

Challenge X: Crossover to Sustainable Mobility was a design competition completed in the Spring of 2008.

HEVT placed Fourth in the first year of the Challenge X competition series (Sharp), First in the second year, Third in the third year, and eighth in the final year. Problems with heavy rains and the Belted Alternator Starter motor (BAS) caused the team to place lower than anticipated in the fourth year.

In the second year of the Challenge X competition, HEVT was the first place team (Gurski). Virginia Tech's competition entry, the REV_{LSE} (Renewable Energy Vehicle, the Larsen Special Edition) is a split parallel hybrid using a Ballard Ranger 67 kW ACI rear traction motor, an 8 kW MES belted alternator starter, and a Saab 2.0 L Flex Fuel SI engine running on E85 – an ethanol/gas blend. Virginia Tech also won first place in lowest well-to-wheels petroleum energy usage, with an overall reduction of petroleum consumption of 74 percent over the stock vehicle, best written technical reports, lowest regulated tailpipe emissions, and lowest time braking and handling (Challenge X).

=== EcoCAR ===
EcoCAR: The NeXt Challenge competition was completed in Spring of 2011. The following is cut from the EcoCAR website:

"EcoCAR seeks to advance the level of vehicle technology capable of reducing petroleum consumption and greenhouse gas (GHG) emissions while demonstrating the real-world performance of a range of technology options."

This is the main goal of the EcoCAR competition. General Motors donated a crossover SUV to the team to use as a base vehicle.

HEVT is using a 4-cylinder, 2.4L E85-capable engine from a Chevrolet HHR to power a 4-speed automatic transmission from a Saturn Vue Green Line. This engine powers the front axle and acts as a range extender for the extended-range electric vehicle. The "VT-REX" vehicle has about a 45-mile all-electric range using a custom A123 Systems battery to power a Siemens electric traction drive capable of about 80 kW of power. Since HEVT will have a large electric range with engine off operation, the air conditioning compressor will work off of high voltage and a DC-DC converter will create about 13.8 V from the high voltage bus to power the 12V accessory loads.

In 2009, HEVT placed 6th overall in the design year of competition. The Year 1 EcoCAR competition focused on hardware-in-the-loop simulation modeling of the design, and creating predictions of performance and fuel economy. The team placed first in the overall competition.

=== EcoCAR 2 ===
EcoCAR 2: Plugging into the Future was a three-year collegiate engineering competition. Students were challenged to turn a 2013 Chevrolet Malibu Eco from a "mundane, mild hybrid" into an "incredible hypermilling prototype." Competition organizers strove to give participants a real-world, hands-on experience that would prepare them for the workforce. As of 2014, approximately 100 of General Motors's engineers had participated in EcoCAR or previous competitions. HEVT placed sixth in the overall competition.

=== EcoCAR 3 ===
EcoCAR 3 HEVT is currently taking part in EcoCAR 3 a competition in which teams have four years to redesign, rebuild and refine a Chevrolet Camaro into a hybrid electric vehicle.

HEVT earned second place in the year 1 final competition. EcoCAR 3 organizers evaluated each team on all of the required pre-competition deliverables, including a facility inspection, high voltage safety demonstration, an architecture selection proposal, and in-depth communication, business and engineering plans. The team won second place in the Stakeholder Status and Electrical presentations and third in the mechanical presentations This fall (2015) HEVT enters the second year of the competition.

== Notes ==
The main facilities for HEVT are located on the Virginia Tech campus in the Ware Lab. HEVT consistently participates in industry sponsored design events and is committed to the development and implementation of advanced vehicle technologies leading to green transportation.
