= École Nationale Supérieure de Géologie =

French institution of higher education

École de Géologie de Nancy
- École Nationale Supérieure de Géologie de Nancy
- Type: Grande école
- Established: 1908
- Affiliations: IMT - Institut Mines-Télécom, University of Lorraine, INPL - National Polytechnic Institute of Lorraine, CGE - Conférence des Grandes Écoles
- Director: Judith Sausse
- Location: Nancy, France
- Website: ensg.univ-lorraine.fr

The École Nationale Supérieure de Géologie (French pronunciation: [ekɔl nɑsjɔnal sypeʁjœʁ də ʒeɔlɔʒi]; "National Superior School of Geology"; abbr. ENSG) is a French grande école, located in Nancy, Grand Est. It is part of the University of Lorraine.

== History ==
The ENSG was created as Institut de Geologie Appliquée de Nancy in 1908, and became a National Engineering School, Ecole Nationale Supérieure de Géologie Appliquée et de Prospection Minière, in 1948.

In 2010, it received the Observatoire des Sciences de l'Univers status from the National Institute for Earth Sciences and Astronomy (INSU) of the Centre national de la recherche scientifique.

== The school ==
The ENSG engineering school is one of the French Grandes Ecoles, part of the University of Lorraine and associated with the Institut Mines-Télécom. It trains students in the main fields of geological engineering. Its flagship degree is the Diplome d'ingénieur de l'ENSG (M2-level), which combines education in mathematics, physics, engineering and geology.

=== Admission ===
The majority of ENSG students are recruited at L3 level after a national competitive entrance exam following a two-year Classe Préparatoire aux Grandes Ecoles or based on an application file after a bachelor's degree. Admissions in second year (M1 level) are also possible for students after a M1 cursus.

=== Curriculum ===
Students follow common classes during the semesters 5, 6 and 7, where they take introductory classes in partial differential equations, geophysics, soil and rock mechanics, porous media, structural geology, sedimentology, mineralogy, geochemistry, computer programming, statistics foreign languages, project management.

During semesters 8 and 9, students specialize in Geotechnics, Mineral resource engineering and management, Water and the environment, Geosciences for energy, Reservoir engineering and hydrodynamics or Numerical geology.

The last Semester (10) is dedicated to an end-of study project, generally performed as an internship.

== Research ==
The ENSG professors and researchers are associated to several research labs:

- CRPG: Centre de Recherches Petrographiques et Geochimiques
- GeoRessources: Geomodels, Raw Materials, Geosystems
- LIEC: Interdisciplinary Laboratory of Continental Environments
- LEMTA: Theoretical and Applied Energetics and Mechanics Laboratory
- LORIA: Computer Science Research and Applications.
- Institut Elie Cartan de Lorraine: Mathematics

== Notable alumni ==
- fr:Edgar Aubert de la Rüe
- Edouard Bard
- Aïssata Issoufou Mahamadou
- fr:François Hommeril
- fr:Thierry Pilenko
