= Advanced Vehicle Technology Competitions =

Advanced vehicle technology competitions (AVTCs) are competitions sponsored by the United States Department of Energy, in partnership with private industry and universities, which stimulates "the development of advanced propulsion and alternative fuel technologies and provide the training ground for the next generation of automotive engineers."

== Overview ==
Since 1988, the U.S. Department of Energy has sponsored advanced vehicle technology competitions (AVTCs) in partnership with the North American automotive industry. Managed by the Argonne National Laboratory, AVTCs represent a unique coalition of government, industry and academic partners who join forces to execute North America's premier collegiate automotive engineering competitions. AVTCs provide a challenging, real-world training ground for North America's future engineers and automotive leaders and accelerate the development and demonstration of technologies of interest to the DOE and the automotive industry.

== History of competitions ==
=== 1988-1990 Methanol Marathon ===
The Methanol Marathon (1988-1990) was an alternative fuels competition for college and university students in the U.S. and Canada. General Motors Corporation provided 1988 Chevrolet Corsicas which were converted to operate on an M85 fuel (85% methanol and 15% hydrocarbons).Competition organizers went on to further challenge the student teams by establishing more stringent and controlled tests of their 1988 Chevrolet Corsicas in 1989. An important addition to the Methanol Marathon was the inclusion of a gasoline-powered control vehicle that provided a baseline from which to judge the effectiveness of the conversions.

=== 1990-1993 Natural Gas Vehicle (NGV) Challenge ===
The Natural Gas Vehicle Challenge (1990-1993) was conducted annually which gave teams the opportunity to go back to the drawing board twice to improve the vehicle in areas believed to be lacking. In 1993, twenty-two colleges and universities from the U.S., Canada, and Mexico, including five new entries, converted a GMC 2500 Sierra truck to run on dedicated natural gas. The teams underwent rigorous testing of emissions, fuel economy, performance, driveability, as well as judging by industry experts. In 1991, only three teams earned points in the emissions event whereas in 1993 eleven teams met or exceeded the current federal emissions standards. Seven teams did better than CARB TLEV emissions standards, and three teams met the CARB ULEV standards. The University of Texas - El Paso vehicle (a first year entry) tested less than 1/2 of the ULEV standard. The average EPA combined fuel economy (from both the city and hwy. tests) went from 12.7 mpg_{‑US} (18.5 L/100 km; 15.3 mpg_{‑imp}) in 1991 to 13.6 mpg_{‑US} (17.3 L/100 km; 16.3 mpg_{‑imp}) in 1992 to 14.82 mpg_{‑US} (15.87 L/100 km; 17.80 mpg_{‑imp}) in 1993.

=== 1992-1995 Hybrid Electric Vehicle (HEV) Challenge ===
The Hybrid Electric Vehicle (HEV) Challenge (1992-1995), was an intercollegiate competition created by the U.S. DOE and SAE. The HEV Challenge began in 1993 with 18 Ford Escort Wagons and 12 Ground-Up vehicles; twelve Saturn SL2 sedans were added in 1994, and twelve Neons were added in the 1995 HEV Challenge. The HEV Challenge consisted of events in which vehicle designs and overall dynamic performance were evaluated. The events included acceleration, handling, range, emissions, fuel economy, consumer acceptability, engineering design review, and technical reports. All three HEV Challenges represented the most ambitious and difficult engineering research competitions to date. Although they showed that HEV technology is still developing, these competitions set performance benchmarks and established testing procedures that will affect the engineering community far after the last event was completed.

=== 1995-1997 Propane Vehicle Challenge ===
The Propane Vehicle Challenge (1995-1997) began with conventional 1996 Chrysler minivan platforms, twelve college teams developed dedicated propane vehicles, while maintaining the performance that consumers expected from gasoline vehicles. The winning entries met the range goal of at least 250 miles with no problem, and the University of Texas-El Paso entry achieved an incredible estimated range of 716 miles upon refueling. 17 colleges and universities participated in the 1997 PVC with some teams using the 1996 Chrysler minivans or Dodge Dakota pickup trucks. For the first time, an award was given for the best component to the University of Texas at El Paso for the development of fuel-distribution spiders. This is a novel fuel-rail design that ensures equal distribution (temperature and pressure) of liquid-phase LPG to each fuel injector.

=== 1995-1999 FutureCar Challenge ===
The FutureCar Challenge (1995-1999), adopted the goals of the Partnership for a New Generation of Vehicles (PNGV), especially the 3X improvement in fuel economy. USCAR partners, Chrysler, Ford, and General Motors, donated a mix of mid-sized sedans to the schools including Intrepids, Luminas, and Taurus'. Fuel used by the teams included reformulated gasoline, diesel and fischer-trophsch diesel, ethanol, compressed natural gas, liquid petroleum gas, hydrogen, dimethyl ether, and electricity. A wide range of events were held to test the vehicles' performance and the teams' ability to communicate their design choices and rationale. Performance improved over time with better batteries, control strategies, and experience.

=== 1997-2000 Ethanol Vehicle Challenge ===
The Ethanol Vehicle Challenge (1997-2000) was developed to demonstrate the potential of ethanol to significantly lower emissions, improve performance, increase fuel efficiency, and improve cold starting of vehicles. During the two years of the competition the platform changed – from a 5-passenger sedan (Chevrolet Malibu) to a full-size truck (Chevrolet Silverado) – to reflect consumer demands for larger vehicles and more power. The venues changed – from GM's Milford Proving Ground in Michigan to a 7-day tour through Ontario, Canada. Events were added (off road, hill climb, trailer tow) or made more challenging (lower cold start temperature. By 2000, the winning vehicle in the emissions event (University of Illinois at Chicago) met the CARB ULEV standard – one of the toughest in the world.

=== 1999-2001 FutureTruck ===
FutureTruck (1999-2001) was designed to develop alternative propulsion systems and fuels that demonstrate increased energy efficiency and reduced emissions while continuing to meet customer expectations for performance and comfort. The U.S. Department of Energy teamed up with other sponsors to challenge more than 200 of the best and brightest students from 15 universities in the United States and Canada to re-engineer full-size SUVs to meet the needs of the future, producing green, efficient transportation that has the performance, utility, and affordability that customers expect.

Working with General Motors during first two years of the competition, teams modified Chevrolet Suburbans by using cutting-edge technologies, such as fuel cells and other advanced propulsion systems, space-age materials, and alternative fuels including biodiesel and ethanol (E-85). Teams were also encouraged to develop technologies that reduce total cycle greenhouse gas (GHG) emissions. FutureTruck included an event that measures upstream fuel-cycle emissions (pollution resulting from producing and delivering a fuel) and dynamometer emissions measurements.

=== 2002-2004 FutureTruck ===
FutureTruck (2002-2004) was designed to develop alternative propulsion systems and fuels that demonstrate increased energy efficiency and reduced emissions while continuing to meet customer expectations for performance and comfort. The U.S. Department of Energy teamed up with other sponsors to challenge more than 200 of the best and brightest students from 15 universities in the United States and Canada to re-engineer full-size SUVs to meet the needs of the future, producing green, efficient transportation that has the performance, utility, and affordability that customers expect.

Working with Ford during the last three years of the competition, teams modified Ford Explorers by using cutting-edge technologies, such as fuel cells and other advanced propulsion systems, space-age materials, and alternative fuels including biodiesel and ethanol (E-85). Teams were also encouraged to develop technologies that reduce total cycle greenhouse gas (GHG) emissions. FutureTruck included an event that measures upstream fuel-cycle emissions (pollution resulting from producing and delivering a fuel) and dynamometer emissions measurements.

=== (2004-2008) Challenge X ===
Challenge X: Crossover to Sustainable Mobility (2004-2008) was a unique four-year engineering competition that provided the opportunity for students across North America to develop advanced propulsion technology solutions that increased energy efficiency and reduce the environmental impact of light-duty vehicles.

To address the issues surrounding personal mobility (like vehicle fuel economy and emissions), General Motors Corporation (GM), the U.S. Department of Energy (DOE), and other government and industry leaders joined to create the advanced vehicle technology competition. This four-year competition managed by Argonne National Laboratory challenged 17 university engineering teams to redesign a Chevrolet Equinox SUV to minimize energy consumption, emissions, and greenhouse gases while maintaining or exceeding the vehicle's utility, safety, and performance.

=== 2008- EcoCAR: The NeXt Challenge ===
Established by the U.S. Department of Energy and General Motors, and managed by Argonne National Lab, EcoCAR: The NeXt Challenge was a three-year (2008-2011) series that challenged 16 universities to redesign a Saturn Vue in order to reduce its environmental impact.

=== EcoCAR 2: Plugging In to the Future ===
Spanning three years from 2011 to 2014, EcoCAR 2: Plugging In to the Future challenged 15 universities to reduce the environmental impact of the 2013 Chevrolet Malibu. This competition was sponsored by the U.S. Department of Energy and General Motors, and managed by Argonne National Lab.

=== EcoCAR 3 ===
EcoCAR 3 is the current installment of AVTCs, spanning from 2014 to 2018, sponsored by the U.S. Department of Energy and General Motors, and managed by Argonne National Lab. This four-year competition challenges 16 North American universities to redesign a 2016 Chevrolet Camaro in order to reduce its environmental impact, while maintaining safety and consumer acceptability. The technical goals of this competition further involve:

- Reducing energy consumption
- Reducing well-to-wheel greenhouse gas emissions
- Reducing criteria tailpipe emissions
- Maintaining consumer acceptability in the areas of performance, utility, and safety
- Meeting energy and environmental goals, while considering cost and innovation

== Universities involved ==
- University of Waterloo, UWaterloo Alternative Fuels Team (UWAFT)
- Embry-Riddle Aeronautical University, Bethune Cookman University,
- Georgia Tech,
- Virginia Tech,
