= Junior Enterprise USA =

Junior Enterprise USA is the association of Junior Enterprises in the United States. The international federations of Junior Enterprises in Europe and Brazil have been recognized by the European Commission and Brazilian government as beneficial student organizations that provide experiential learning opportunities and foster an entrepreneurial spirit among junior entrepreneurs. The first Junior Enterprise, CUBE Consulting, was founded in the United States in 2012 at the University of Illinois Urbana-Champaign and was followed by the establishment of two other Junior Enterprises during the period of 2012-2015. In 2016, the creation of Lumnus Consulting at UC San Diego was a pivotal moment because it represented the unification of student-run companies in the USA through the JE USA association.

Junior Enterprise USA grew rapidly, largely due to how it identified potential leaders and spread the JE concept through the successful creation of development programs that supported initiatives during their first months of operation. Current (as of May 2026) American chapters of Junior Enterprises and Junior Initiatives are located at UC Berkeley, Columbia University, UC San Diego, University of Pennsylvania, Penn State University, New York University, University of Illinois Urbana-Champaign, Purdue University, University of North Carolina, University of South Florida and many other universities.

== CUBE Consulting ==
Champaign Urbana Business and Engineering Consulting was the first Junior Enterprise in the United States. It was founded in 2012 at the University of Illinois Urbana-Champaign through a partnership with iFoundry and Engineering Initiatives, both programs through the College of Engineering. Retired Illinois engineering professor Dave Goldberg spoke at the international Junior Entrepreneur World Conference in Brazil during the summer of 2011 and shared the Junior Enterprise with iFoundry, an engineering education incubator, and several of its students. Dave Goldberg would later feature CUBE Consulting in his book A Whole New Engineer as a revolutionary method of experiential engineering education. Using the support of iFoundry and the student-led Engineering Initiatives club, Illinois engineering students Karen Lamb, Stephanie Chou and Stephanie Nemec founded the first US Junior Enterprise in 2012. This eventually became CUBE Consulting.

Junior Enterprise USA is exclusively student-run. Every semester, numerous projects allow students to partner with local businesses. CUBE Consulting now has over 100 alumni working across the United States and around the world.

== Lumnus Consulting ==
Lumnus Consulting was founded in 2016 and based in UC San Diego. As of 2018, Lumnus has a team of 40 members and had completed a dozen projects. With strategic partners such as Johnson & Johnson's JLabs, Evonexus, and Avasant Management consulting, Lumnus works primarily with startups in the greater San Diego area.
