= Judith Sausse =

French geophysicist

Judith Sausse is a French geophysicist whose research focuses on the modeling and behavior of fractured reservoirs and fluid–rock interaction, and applications in geothermal energy. She is a professor in the École nationale supérieure des mines de Nancy and director of the École Nationale Supérieure de Géologie, both part of the University of Lorraine.

== Education and career ==
Sausse defended her doctoral thesis, Caractérisation et modélisation des écoulements fluides en milieu fissuré : relation avec les altérations hydrothermales et quantification des paléocontraintes, in 1997 under the direction of Marc Lespinasse at Henri Poincaré University, now part of the University of Lorraine.

She became maître de conférences at the university in 2000, and received a habilitation there in 2009. In 2006 she joined the geosciences department in the university's Faculty of Science and Technology. In 2011 she moved to the École nationale supérieure des mines de Nancy (Mines Nancy) as director of the civil engineering degree program, and she was named as a professor at Mines Nancy in 2013. In 2018, she was selected as the director of the École Nationale Supérieure de Géologie.

== Recognition ==
Sausse was named as a knight (chevalier) in the Ordre des Palmes académiques in 2016. She received the French national medal for mines, industry, and energy (vermeil echelon) in 2026.
