= Hôtel de Ville, Vandœuvre-lès-Nancy =

Town hall in Vandœuvre-lès-Nancy, France

Hôtel de Ville
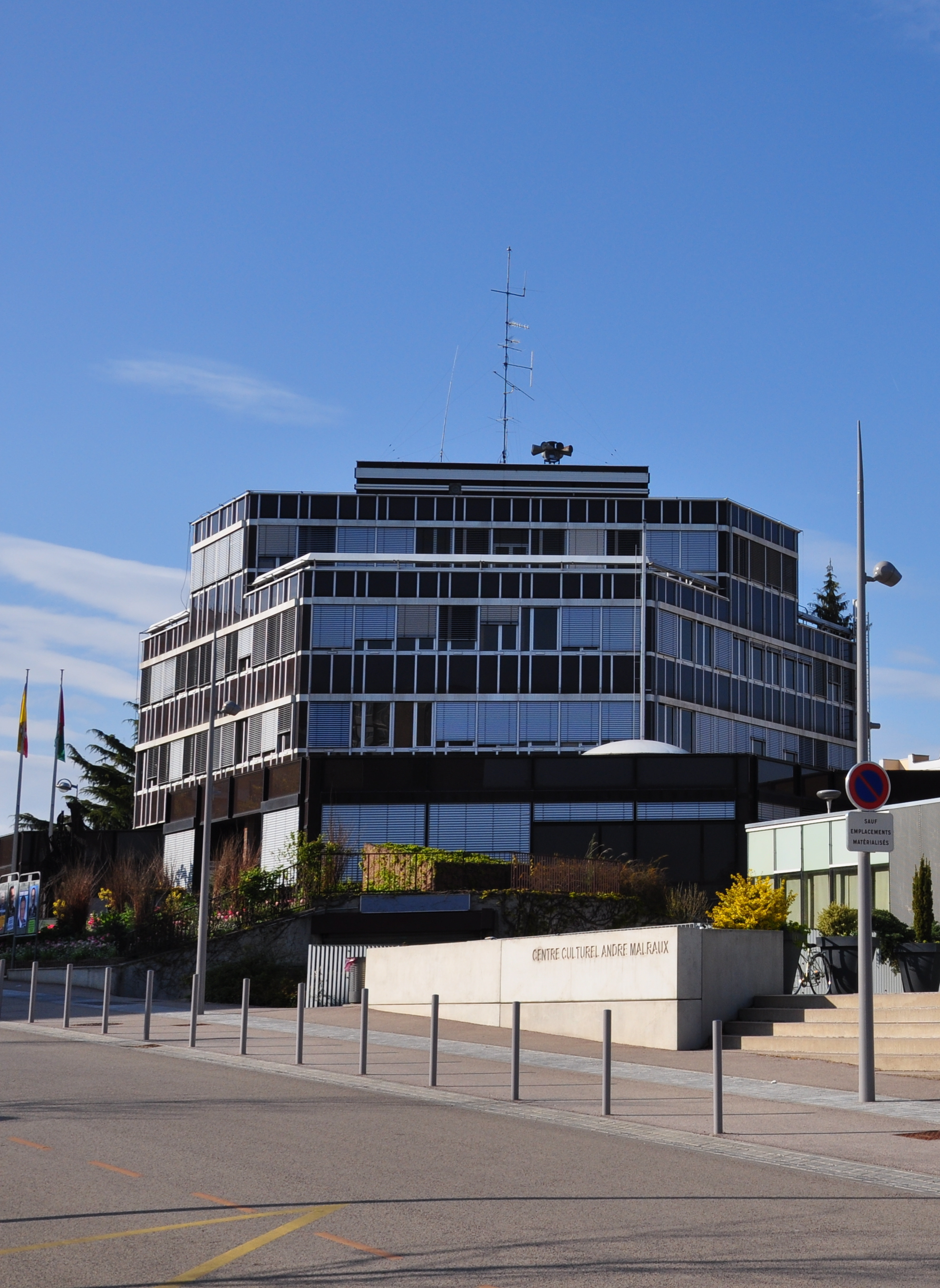
- The main frontage of the Hôtel de Ville in April 2012
- Interactive map of the Hôtel de Ville area

General information
- Type: City hall
- Architectural style: Modern style
- Location: Vandœuvre-lès-Nancy, France
- Coordinates: 48.6602°N 6.1726°E
- Completed: 1980

The Hôtel de Ville (French pronunciation: [otɛl də vil], City Hall) is a municipal building in Vandœuvre-lès-Nancy, Meurthe-et-Moselle in north-eastern France, standing on Rue de Parme.

== History ==
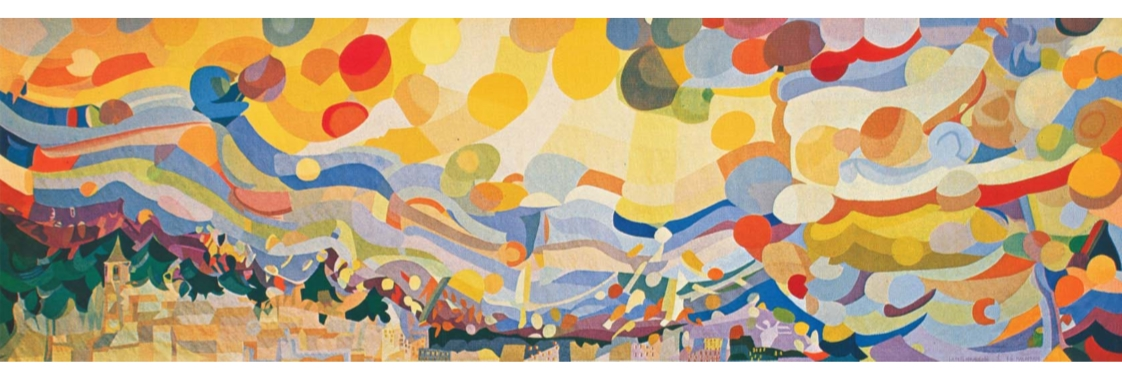
Mural by Françoise Malaprade in the council chamber

In the 19th century, the town council met in the house of the mayor at the time. This arrangement continued until the early 20th century when the council led by the mayor, Paul Joseph Richard, decided to establish a combined town hall and school. The site they selected was a former sheepfold a short distance to the north of the Church of Saint-Mélaine. The new building was designed in the neoclassical style, built in ashlar stone and completed in 1908. The design involved a symmetrical main frontage of five bays facing onto what is now Place de la République. The outer bays contained segmental headed doorways, one for boys and one for girls. The other bays on the ground floor were fenestrated by tripartite casement windows while the bays on the first floor were all fenestrated by bi-partite casement windows. At roof level, there was a clock, flanked by pilasters supporting a triangular pediment, above the central bay.

Internally, there were two classrooms for boys, two classrooms for girls, and a municipal office as well as accommodation for the teachers. After the building was now longer required for municipal purposes, it continued to serve as a school and later became the École élémentaire Jules-Ferry.

After the Second World War, the area to the northeast of the old town centre was designated a zone à urbaniser par priorité (priority regeneration zone). A temporary town hall was established opposite the Maison Jeunes et Culture (Youth and Culture Centre), now known as "MJC Lorraine", on Rue de Lorraine. However, in the 1970s, following a substantial increase in population, the council led by the mayor, Richard Pouille, decided to commission a more substantial town hall. The site they selected was on the northeastern side of Rue de Parme in the centre of the new regeneration area. The new building was designed in the modern style, built in concrete and glass with black cladding and was completed in 1980.

The design involved a hexagonal three-storey tower sitting on a podium. The first two storeys of the tower were faced with alternating bands of glass and black cladding, while the third storey of the tower was fenestrated in a similar style, but the shape was truncated on two sides. Internally, the principal room was the Salle du Conseil (council chamber), which was decorated with a fine mural painted by Françoise Malaprade and entitled "La Fête Républicaine". It was 9.25 meters (30.3 ft) long and 2.85 meters (9 ft 4 in) high and was completed shortly before the opening of the building.

A major programme of refurbishment works, involving the replacement of the ceilings and partitions on the ground floor, was completed at a cost of €400,000 in February 2025.
