= Guillaume Rozier =

"Most mediated Data Scientist of the moment" - Les Echos

- Born: Guillaume, Aymeric, Gabriel Rozier; April 28, 1996 (age 28)
- Citizenship: French
- Education: IMT-BS and Telecom Nancy.
- Occupation(s): Creator of CovidTracker and VaccinTracker projects
- Website: Covidtracker

Guillaume Rozier (born in April 1996) is a French engineer, data aggregator, consultant in data science, qualified on January 5, 2021, by the daily Les Echos as a "Most mediated Data Scientist of the moment". He is at the origin of website CovidTracker who regroup data about COVID-19 in France. Also, this website hosts VaccinTracker and ViteMaDose who regroup available appointments for the vaccination against COVID-19.

== Biography ==
=== Family and childhood ===
Guillaume Rozier was born in April 1996 from a father who is computer scientist, and from a mother who is professor of physics.

When he was a teenager, he says he was interested about physics, meteorology and mathematics.

=== Education ===
Although earlier interested about IT, Guillaume Rozier didn't think he was a "geek" because he didn't know how to program when he got his scientific baccalaureate. After prep school in Champollion high-school at Grenoble, he joined Télécom Nancy in 2016. Also in 2018 he got a Master of Business Administration (MBA) from Telecom Business School. During his studies, he studied big-data applied in the medical sector.

=== Career ===
Guillaume Rozier works henceforth for a French IT consulting group, a subsidiary of the American company Accenture.

== CovidTracker and ViteMaDose ==
Guillaume Rozier is famous for having created CovidTracker, a website aggregating data about COVID-19 in France, and also because he has created ViteMaDose ("QuickMyDose" in English) which allows people to find an appointment to be vaccinated against COVID-19. Indeed, ViteMaDose regroups the different appointment availability in the region.

== Recognition ==
On May 21, 2021, Guillaume Rozier was nominated exceptionally to the rank of Knight in the French National Order of Merit.
