= Telecom Nancy =

Third-level education institution in France

TELECOM Nancy
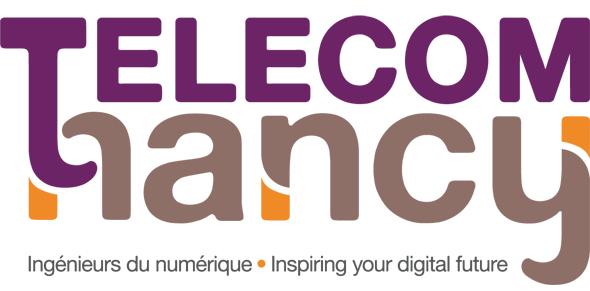
- Type: Public Grandes écoles
- Established: 1990
- Chairperson: Pascal QUÉRU
- Director: Olivier FESTOR
- Academic staff: 33, and more than 60 outside speakers (October 2009)
- Students: 250 (January 2011)
- Location: Nancy, France; 48.6691605°N 6.1544757°E
- Campus: Campus Aiguillettes (Villers-lès-Nancy)
- Mascot: Pink Rabbit
- Website: www.telecomnancy.eu

TELECOM Nancy is a public graduate school of engineering operating in Villers-de-Nancy, France since 1990, as a part of the University of Lorraine. Before the school was renamed in 2012, it was known as l'École supérieure d'informatique et applications de Lorraine (ÉSIAL). The grande école is also affiliated with l'Institut Mines-Télécom.

It is the only school of generalised engineering studies in information technology and digital sciences accredited by the Commission des Titres de l’Ingénieur (CTI) in the Grand Est region of France. The standard curriculum is a three-year program (after two years of preparation) resulting in the French Diplôme d'Ingénieur, which is equivalent to a Master's degree of the European Higher Education Area.

== Educational programmes ==
TELECOM Nancy is aimed at producing engineers well-versed in the principles of computing science and automation, and experts at integrating computing hardware and software into their products: information systems engineering, networking engineering, software engineering, telecommunications engineering, and systems engineering. Studies are organized into four possible themes and students (at the end of the first common year) have to choose a field they want to learn more about:

- IL - Ingénierie Logicielle Software engineering
- SIE - Systèmes d'Information d'Entreprise (Enterprise Information Systems)
- TRS - Télécommunications, Réseaux et Systèmes / Services Telecommunication
- LE - Logiciels Embarqués Embedded software
- IAMD - Masse de Données Big Data

At the end of each year, TELECOM Nancy students have to do an internship in order to practise their knowledge and be part of the Working world:

- First year: a one-month internship in a non-computer science field, in order to discover the everyday life in a firm.
- Second year: a two-month internship in a computer development field.
- Third year: a six-month engineer internship.

Also, the third year can happen in another school or university. You can use a few networks the school is connected to:

- ERASMUS, giving access to many schools in Europe.
- CREPUQ, giving access to Canada's schools.
- Or simply stay in the network of schools that are partners of the Université de Lorraine, as is TELECOM Nancy.

== Teaching ==
Most of TELECOM Nancy teachers are researchers, mainly in these three laboratories:

- the LORIA (Laboratoire lorrain de recherche en informatique et ses applications), associated with the INRIA Lorraine (Institut national de recherche en informatique et en automatique) since 1986.
- the CRAN (Centre de recherche en automatique de Nancy), associated with CNRS (Centre national de la recherche scientifique) for more than ten years.
- the IECN (Institut Élie Cartan de Nancy) associated with CNRS and the INRIA Lorraine

== Notable alumni ==
- Guillaume Rozier, a French engineer, data aggregator, and consultant in data science

== See also ==
- Education in France
- Grandes écoles
- Concours commun Mines-Ponts
