= Edouard Bard =

French climatologist and researcher

Edouard Bard, born on September 1, 1962, is a French climatologist, Professor of Climate and Ocean Evolution at the Collège de France and a member of the French Academy of Sciences.

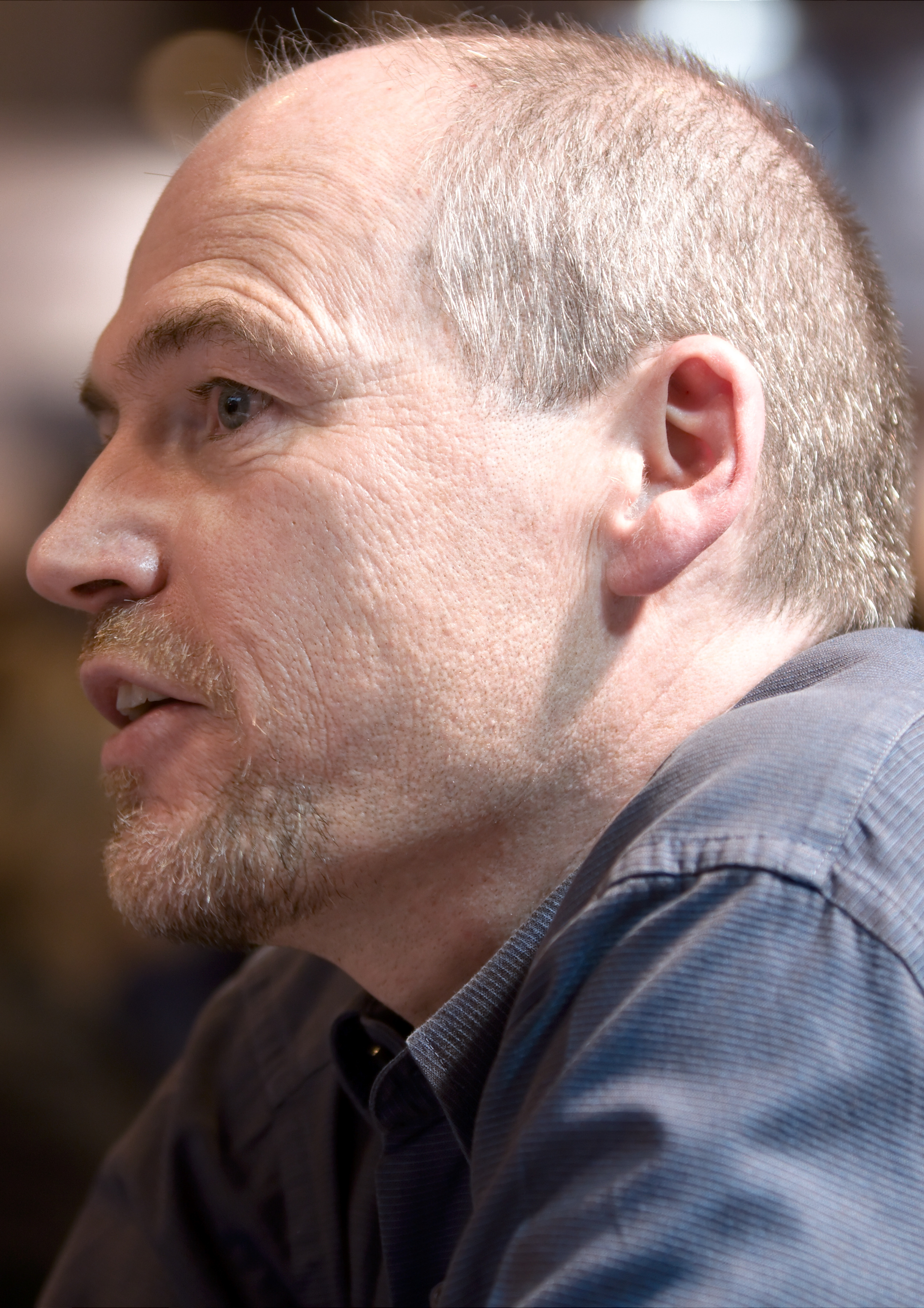
Edouard Bard - 2010

== Biography ==
After studying geological engineering (ENSG) in Nancy, Edouard Bard began his research at the Commissariat à l'énergie atomique (CEA) in Gif-sur-Yvette (doctoral thesis in 1987) and continued at the Lamont–Doherty Earth Observatory of Columbia University in New York as a postdoctoral fellow in 1988 and as an associate researcher in 1989. Back in France, he first joined the CEA as a researcher, then began teaching as a professor at the University of Aix-Marseille in 1991 and at the Collège de France in 2001. He is currently deputy director of the European Centre for Research and Education in Environmental Geosciences (CEREGE) at the Arbois Technopole in Aix-en-Provence and coordinates the EQUIPEX ASTER-CEREGE, project.

Edouard Bard is the author of more than 200 articles in the peer-reviewed scientific literature, as well as some thirty popular articles (some available for download) and books intended for the general public, including L'Homme et le climat, Découvertes Gallimard, 2005 and director-author of L'Homme face au climat, Odile Jacob, 2006 and L'Océan, le climat et nous: un équilibre fragile ?, Le Pommier & Universcience, 2011.

In 2011 and 2012, he was scientific curator of the exhibition "L'océan, le climat et nous" at the Cité des sciences et de l'industrie de la Villette in Paris.

Since 2004, Edouard Bard has organized numerous symposia and symposia at the Collège de France on climate and ocean change, some of which are widely open to the general public and politicians, such as "L'Homme face au climat" in 2004, "Closing the Fourth International Polar Year" in 2009 in partnership with the Senate, "Arctic : the major scientific challenges" in 2012 in partnership with the Arctic Workshop, "Climate, energy and society: the Collège de France and COP21" in 2015 with the participation of the President of the Republic, François Hollande.

In 2007, he was vice-president of Group 1 of the Grenelle de l'Environnement on the fight against climate change and energy management, and participated in the French government delegations in Ilulissat in Greenland and Bali in Indonesia for the United Nations Climate Change Conference (COP13). In 2009, he was a member of the Commission du Grand Emprunt national (Programme des investissements d'avenir) chaired by Alain Juppé and Michel Rocard, former prime ministers. From 2010 to 2013, he was a member of the Scientific Council of OPECST.

== Scientific contributions ==
Edouard Bard's scientific work is at the interface of climatology, oceanography and geology. Its main objective is to understand the natural functioning of the ocean-atmosphere-cryosphere-biosphere system on time scales ranging from a few centuries to several million years. Better documenting these changes, accurately dating them, understanding their mechanisms and modelling them are important tasks in projects to predict future climate change.

For his research, Edouard Bard uses analytical chemistry techniques to determine the magnitude and chronology of climate variations. New quantitative methods have allowed him to reconstruct past environments from various archives such as marine and lake sediments, corals, stalagmites and polar ice. The common thread is the desire to study the same climatic phenomena, such as glaciations, using complementary and often innovative geochemical techniques. To study the climate of the past, he uses "time machines" - sophisticated mass spectrometers to measure radioactive isotopes and date climate variations recorded in geological archives. Another feature of his research is a back and forth between studies of past and recent periods, as well as current environments. Since variations in the climate system involve mechanisms with very different time constants, it is indeed crucial to have a long-term perspective in order to be able to distinguish the effects of climate forcings according to their geological, astronomical and anthropogenic origins.

Edouard Bard's main scientific contributions concern the following topics: the diffusion of radiocarbon-labelled carbon dioxide in the ocean (first measurements in accelerator mass spectrometry, variations in surface ocean temperature using organic, isotopic and elemental geochemistry indicators, the dating of fossil corals by mass spectrometry of uranium and thorium to reconstruct sea level variations and to study the history of ice caps, the innovative use of radiocarbon as a tracer of CO_{2} exchanges at the ocean-atmosphere interface, the calibration of the radiocarbon dating method and the use of other cosmogenic nuclides such as beryllium 10 to reconstruct solar activity in the past, as well as variations in the geomagnetic field and the global carbon cycle.

A more detailed description of Edouard Bard's research is available on the GEOMAR Kiel website (Helmholtz Centre for Ocean Research) published as part of the Petersen Foundation's 2013 Award of Excellence.

== Main awards and honours ==
  1991 - CNRS Bronze medal, For his research

  1993 - Outstanding Young Scientist Award from the European Union of Geosciences

  1994 - Junior member of the Institut universitaire de France (IUF)

  1997 - Donath Medal of the Geological Society of America (GSA) and Fellow of the GSA

  1997 - Paul Gast Award Geochemical Society Reading

  1997 - Macelwane Medal of the American Geophysical Union (AGU) and Fellow of the AGU

  2005 - A.G. Huntsman Award for excellence in the marine sciences (Canada)

  2005 - Georges Lemaître Prize for Geophysics and Astronomy (Belgium)

  2006 - Sverdrup Award Lecture, "ocean sciences" section of the AGU

  2006 - Grand Prix Gérard Mégie of the French Academy of Sciences and the CNRS

  2007 - Chevallier in the Ordre National de la Légion d'Honneur

  2009 - elected Member of the Academia Europaea[42]

  2010 - elected member of the French Academy of Sciences (Institut de France)[43]

  2011 - elected Foreign Member of the Royal Belgian Academy, Science Section

  2012 - Jaeger-Hales Australian National University (Canberra) Reading

  2013 - Wegener Medal of the European Geosciences Union (EGU) and Honorary Fellow of the EGU

  2013 - Award of Excellence from the Petersen Foundation, Helmholtz Centre for Ocean Research, GEOMAR Kiel

  2014 - elected Foreign Member of the National Academy of Sciences of the USA

  2014 - Grand Medal Prince Albert 1st of the Oceanographic Institute of Monaco. Video

  2016 (As well as 2014 and 2001) - Thomson Reuters Highly Cited Researcher

== See also ==
- Meltwater pulse 1B (en)
