= Junior enterprise =

Nonprofit organization operated by student

A Junior Enterprise (JE as abbreviation) is a civil social non religious, non political, nonprofit organization established and executed entirely by students of a university, a business school or other higher educational institution, both at the undergraduate and postgraduate level. The organization's purpose is to provide services for companies, institutions and society, often in the form of consultancies, while enriching the learning of its members with practical experience in the field of their studies. Usually, a junior enterprise is linked to a particular university or business school; by internal regulation, in most cases, a student must be studying at the specific university to join the organization.

The most common expertise areas for junior enterprises are business and management, engineering, marketing, communication, IT services and law. The members of the organization have the chance to take part in real-world projects, while experiencing the functioning of a real company: junior enterprises, indeed, either are real companies, or resemble one in their operational activities, often having a management council and an executive board, together with an own regulation.

== The concept ==
A Junior Enterprise is a student-run, non-profit association that mirrors the structure and operation of a real company. Embedded within a university or institution of higher education, each Junior Enterprise is founded and managed entirely by students who deliver professional services to real clients - ranging from start-ups and NGOs to established companies and public institutions.

These services typically reflect the academic strengths of the students involved, spanning disciplines such as business, engineering, marketing, law, IT, and beyond. The students identify opportunities, pitch and negotiate with clients, and execute the work - transforming classroom theory into real-world impact.

Unlike simulations or short-term programmes, JEs operate year-round as formal legal entities, offering structured, project-based learning experiences that instil not only technical know-how but also entrepreneurial confidence, leadership skills, and a commitment to societal progress.

Each Junior Enterprise adheres to a set of international standards from the Global Network. These include being:

1. Non-profit: a legally registered entity in the respective country with the
2. Non-political: not affiliated to political movement or party. However, they are able to lobby.
3. Non-religious: not affiliated to a religious movement or church.
4. Managed entirely by students: only students make and execute strategic decisions.
5. Linked to an institution of higher education, but not necessarily affiliated legally. However, proactive efforts should be made to seek support from the University.
6. Fostering members development: The end result of every project should be the development of members by any mean (hard & soft skills in real business context).
7. Aiming at sustainable activity The JE Concept is linked to the UN Sustainable Development Goals with all its doings, especially to the SDGs 4, 5, 8, 9 and 17.

== History ==
- 1967: Establishment of the first Junior Enterprise in France.
- 1969: Establishment of the second Junior Enterprise in Lille, France: EDHEC Junior Etudes.
- 1969: Creation of the French National Confederation.
- 1983: Foundation of the first Junior Entreprise in Switzerland, at the Swiss Federal Institute of Technology in Lausanne (EPFL).
- 1987: Foundation of a network of Junior Enterprises in the Netherlands.
- 1987: Foundation of the first Junior Enterprise at the LUISS University in Italy, based in Rome
- 1988: Foundation of Junior Comtec, the first Junior Enterprise in Germany, based in Darmstadt.
- 1988: Foundation of JEME Bocconi, the second Junior Enterprise in Italy, based in Milan. Foundation of the first Junior Enterprises (EJFGV, Poli Junior and UFBAjr) in Brazil.
- 1991: Foundation of EAA Consult, the first Junior Enterprise in Belgium, based in Liège.
- 1991: Foundation of the first JE of University of Campinas, Brazil.
- 1992: Foundation of CIJE (later called JE Italy), the Italian Confederation of Junior Enterprises, in order to link the National Confederations. It is based in Milan.
- 1992: Foundation of JADE in order to link the National Confederations. It is based in Brussels.
- 1992: Foundation of the Junior Enterprise of the University of Campinas School of Mechanical Engineering, Brazil.
- 1992: Foundation of the Junior Enterprise of the Engineering School of São Carlos, Brazil.
- 1993: Foundation of the first Junior Enterprise of Berlin, Germany.
- 1993: Foundation of the Junior Enterprise of Pontifícia Universidade Católica of São Paulo, Brazil.
- 1995: Foundation of Westminster Business Consultants, the first Junior Enterprise in the UK, based at the University of Westminster in London.
- 1996: CEJE joins JADE.
- 1997: Foundation of Junior Enterprise of the Swiss Federal Institute of Technology in Zurich, called "ETH Zurich".
- 1997: Foundation of the Junior Enterprise of the Institute of Physics "Gleb Wataghin" and the Institute of Mathematics, Statistics and Scientific Computing, University of Campinas, Brazil. Quanta Jr. is the first Junior Enterprise of Physics and Math in Latin America.
- 1998: Foundation of the first Junior Enterprise in Poland - Junior Consulting Group (presently ConQuest Consulting).
- 1998: Foundation of BCJE, the Belgian Federation of Junior Enterprises, in order to unite the Belgian network.
- 2003: Foundation of the Brazilian Confederation of Junior Enterprises.
- 2004: Foundation of Junior Enterprise of the École hôtelière de Lausanne. First Junior Enterprise worldwide within the hospitality industry.
- 2004: Foundation of the Confederation of Poland
- 2005: Foundation of Confederation JADE UK, with WBC London acting as a point of contact.
- 2007: JADE Switzerland comprises 10 Junior Enterprises (Impact Zurich University of Zurich, JEF University of Fribourg, JEHEC University of Lausanne, EHL Junior Enterprise École hôtelière de Lausanne, Junior Entreprise EPFL, University of Neuchatel, ESPRIT St. Gallen University of St. Gallen, Brainstart University of Winterthur, ETH Juniors Zürich)
- 2008: Foundation of the Junior Enterprise of the Production Engineering, Universidade Federal de São Carlos, campus Sorocaba, Brazil
- 2012: The Tunisian Confederation of Junior Enterprises was created: JET (Junior Enterprises of Tunisia, Foundation of Junior Enterprise Desautels, the first Junior Enterprise in North America, based in Montreal (McGill University), foundation of the first Junior Enterprise in the USA based in The University of Illinois Urbana-Champaign: CUBE Consulting
- 2013: Foundation of WAVE Junior Enterprise, the first JE in Mexico based in Mexico City at Instituto Tecnológico Autónomo de México, ITAM
- 2014: The Global Council for worldwide organisation of the Network was founded.
- 2015: Recognition of JEBrighton by JADE UK point of contact as the second Junior Entreprise of the United Kingdom.
- 2016: Creation of the American Confederation of Junior Enterprises.
- 2017: Creation of Unovator Junior Enterprise at the Claremont Colleges (Pomona College), California, US.
- 2019: A formalised global audit concept (the Global Confederation Maturity Model) is accepted.
- 2020: JE Global, former Global Council, is founded as the global umbrella for Junior Enterprises.
- 2020: The 1000 initiative from JE Global brings 1000 pro bono project opportunities to the JEs in the COVID pandemic.

== JE Concept in facts and figures ==
The recognition and acceptance of the Junior Enterprise movement by politicians, public institutions and companies, confirms and proofs the concept of junior entrepreneurship:

- Junior Enterprise is an example of best practice for practical education and development under the Lisbon Strategy: governing strategy of EU in 2000-2010. "Facilitate the development of Junior Enterprises" is a key priority for Education and Youth Framework of EU2020 – governing strategy of EU in 2010-2020.

=== Facts and Figures ===
Diverse studies carried out by the European Commission and other parties, prove that participation in a Junior Enterprise dramatically improves a student's career perspectives, employment and intentions towards entrepreneurship.

- More than 60% of students who were part of a Junior Enterprise find a job before ending their studies.
- Former Junior Entrepreneurs have significantly better career start after university and continue to develop more successfully in the long-term than their peers' average without Junior Enterprise experience.
- 21% of the Junior Entrepreneurs end up starting their own business within the first 3 years after graduation, when the EU average is 4–8%.
- A study ("Effects and impact of entrepreneurship programmes in Higher Education") carried out by the European Commission (DG ENTR) on Junior Enterprise Alumni, compared with normal students shows that:
  - 25% of JE Alumni indicate that it is (very) likely for them to start their own business within the next ten years; compared to 16% of other students that have taken entrepreneurial education formal courses and to 10% of students who have not received any kind of entrepreneurship education;
  - 78% of JE Alumni find a job right after graduation; compared to 66% of other students that have taken entrepreneurial education courses and to 59% of students who have not received any kind of entrepreneurship education

== Brasil Júnior - Brazilian Confederation of Junior Enterprises ==
Brasil Junior is the world's biggest junior enterprise confederation, composed by more than 1600 confederated Junior Enterprises and more than 25,000 Junior Entrepreneurs. It has as purpose to represent the junior enterprises nationwide and develop the Junior Enterprise Movement as an agent of business education and generation of new business. The Junior Enterprise Concept is engraved in law in Brazil.

== JE Global - Global Umbrella Organisation ==
Since the 2000s, Junior Enterprises appeared also in other parts of the world like Morocco, South Africa, India, Australia, Canada and China. With holding the first Junior Enterprises World Conference in 1997 in Belo Horizonte, Brazil the idea of a global umbrella organisation sparked. This was fullfilled in 2014 with the foundation of Junior Enterprises Global. As of 2024, there are 2.100 Junior Enterprises in over 45 countries in the world. Most recently, the development efforts have been focused on bringing even more organisations to Africa and Latin America.

== See also ==
- (in French) French National Confederation of Junior Enterprises (CNJE)
