= University of Lorraine =

Multi-campus public university in Lorraine, France

Coordinates: 48°41′46″N 6°10′36″E

- Université de Lorraine
- Motto: Faire dialoguer les savoirs, c'est innover
- Motto in English: Innovation through the dialogue between knowledge fields
- Type: Public
- Established: 1572; 2012 (reestablished)
- Affiliations: Campus Europae, Grands établissements, EPSCP
- Budget: €682 million (2022)
- President: Hélène Boulanger
- Academic staff: 4,000
- Administrative staff: 3,000
- Students: 62,000
- Doctoral students: 1,900
- Location: Nancy, Metz, Epinal, Thionville, Grand Est, France
- Campus: Urban
- Colors: Black, Yellow and White
- Website: www.univ-lorraine.fr

The University of Lorraine (French: Université de Lorraine), abbreviated as UL, is a public research university based in Lorraine, Grand Est region, France. It was created on 1 January 2012, by the merger of Henri Poincaré University, Nancy 2 University, Paul Verlaine University – Metz and the National Polytechnic Institute of Lorraine (INPL). It aimed to unify the main colleges of the Lorraine region. The merger process started in 2009 with the creation of a Pôle de recherche et d'enseignement supérieur (PRES) and was completed in 2012.

The university has 51 campus sites, over the Lorraine region, the main ones are around Nancy and Metz. The other sites are in the towns of Epinal, Saint-Dié-des-Vosges, Bar-Le-Duc, Lunéville, Thionville-Yutz, Longwy, Forbach, Saint-Avold, Sarreguemines.

The University of Lorraine has over 62,000 students (10,000 international students, mostly from Luxembourg, Germany, Italy, China, Morocco, Algeria, Tunisia, Senegal, Cameroon and Côte d'Ivoire) and 7,000 staff.

== History ==
The original University of Lorraine was founded in 1572, in the nearby city of Pont-à-Mousson by Charles III, duke of Lorraine, and Charles, Cardinal of Lorraine, it was then run by the Jesuits. The university was transferred to Nancy in 1768. It was closed by the revolutionaries in 1793, and reopened in 1864.

In 1968, the Faure law created the Henri Poincaré University (Nancy 1), Nancy 2 University and the National Polytechnic Institute of Lorraine. The Paul Verlaine University – Metz was created in 1971. In 2012, the 3 universities of Nancy and that of Metz were merged to create the current University of Lorraine.

So, the University of Lorraine was formed by the merger of:

- Nancy-Université, itself a merger of:
  - Henri Poincaré University (Nancy 1)
  - Nancy 2 University
  - National Polytechnic Institute of Lorraine (INPL)
- Paul Verlaine University – Metz

The University of Lorraine is also supported by a university foundation, ID+ Lorraine.

== Teaching ==
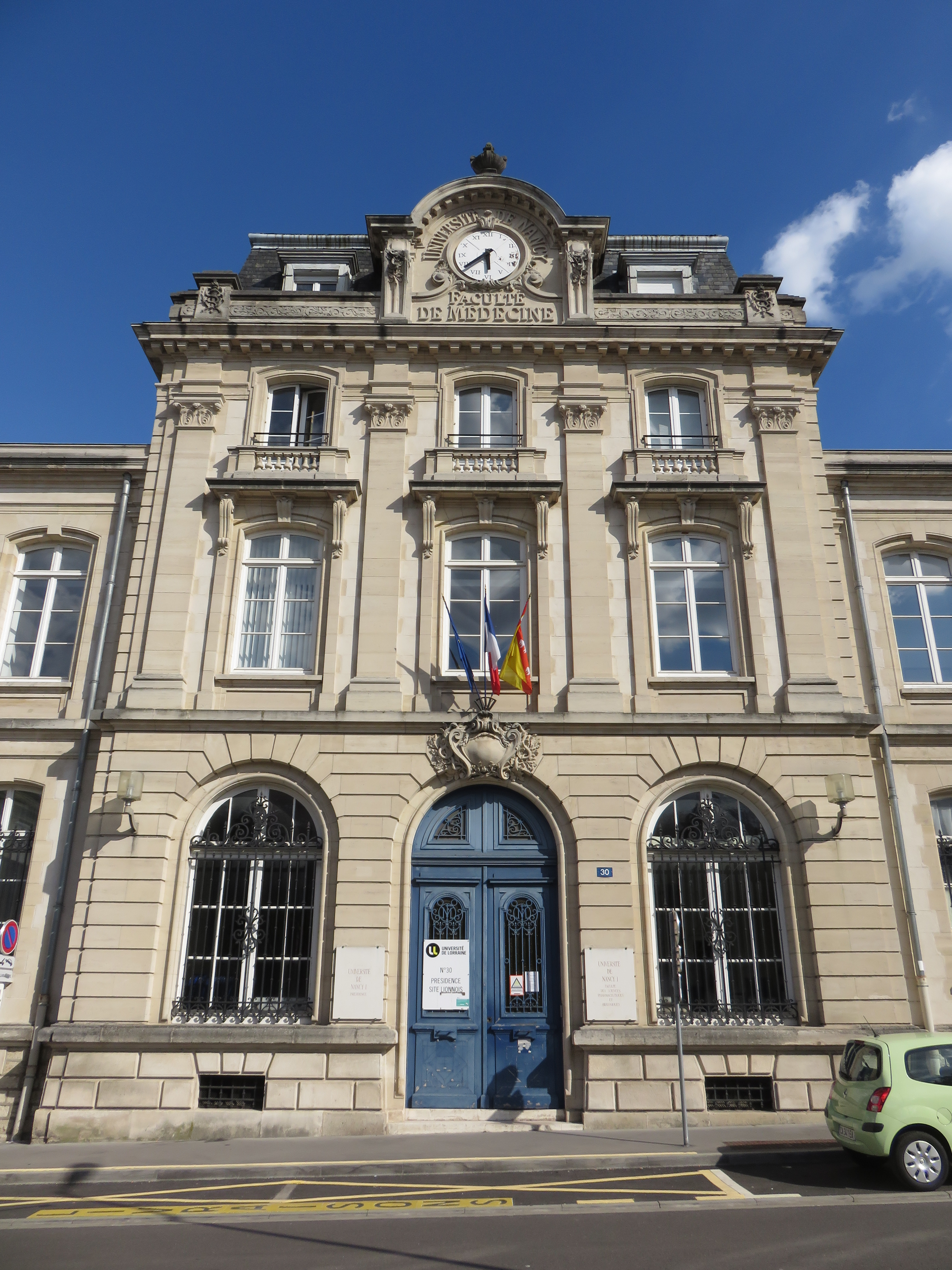
Faculty of Medicine in 2018

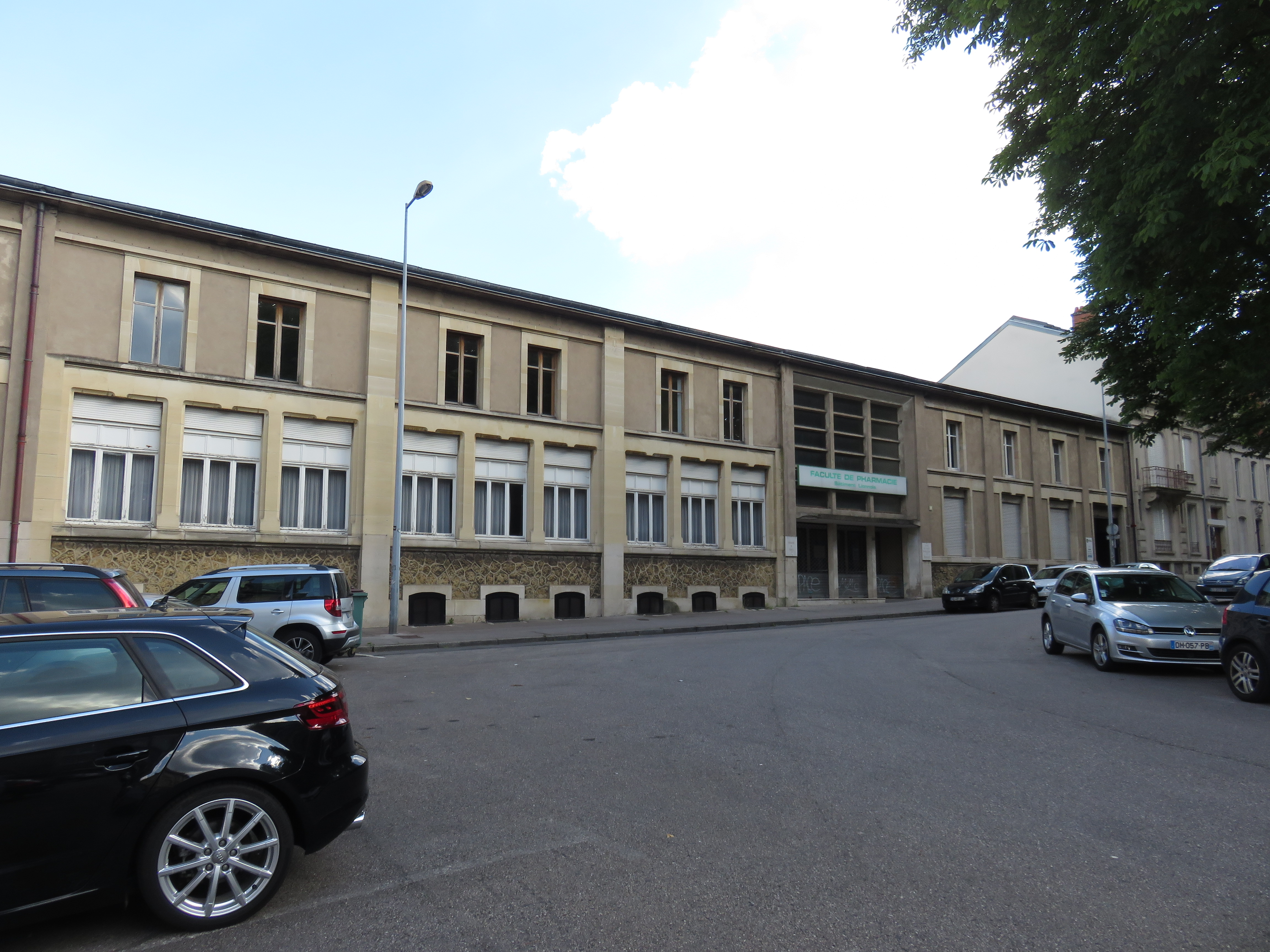
Faculty of Pharmacy in 2018

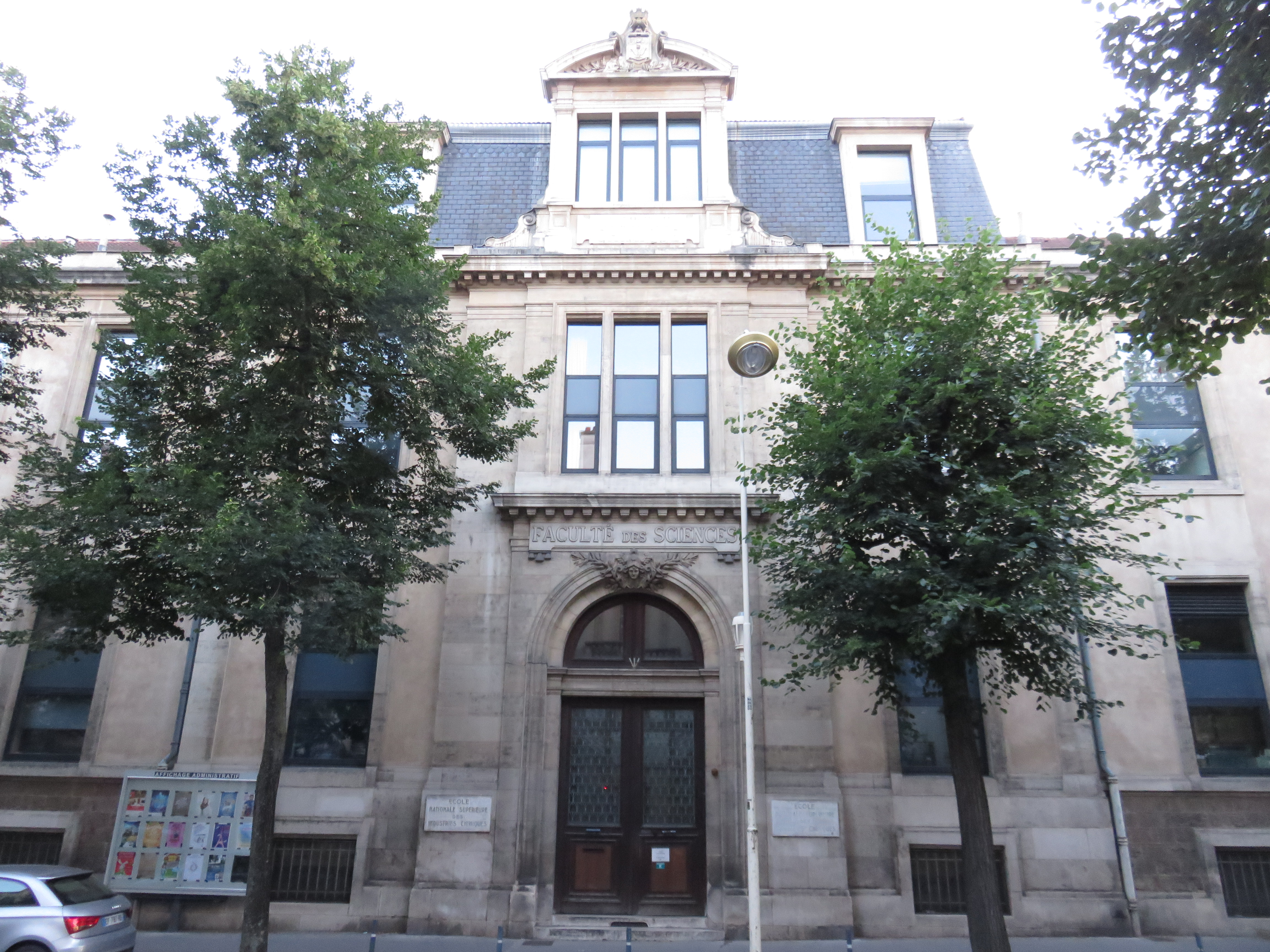
École Nationale Supérieure des Industries Chimiques in 2018

Teaching includes 43 teaching units (faculties, schools, departments), organized into 9 collegia:

- Arts, Literature, and Languages
- Engineering Schools
- Health
- Humanities and Social Sciences
- Interface
- Law, Economy, and Management
- Lorraine Management Innovation
- Sciences and Technologies
- Technology

== Engineering schools ==
- École européenne d'ingénieurs en génie des matériaux (EEIGM) : material engineering
- École nationale d'ingénieurs de Metz (ENIM)
- École Nationale Supérieure des Industries Alimentaires (ENSAIA): agricultural engineering
- École Nationale Supérieure d'Electricité et de Mécanique (ENSEM): electrical and mechanical engineering
- École Nationale Supérieure de Géologie (ENSG): geology
- École Nationale Supérieure des Industries Chimiques (ENSIC): chemistry
- École Nationale Supérieure des Technologies et Industries du Bois (ENSTIB): wood industry and technology engineering
- École nationale supérieure en génie des systèmes et de l'innovation (ENSGSI)
- Mines Nancy
- Polytech Nancy
- Telecom Nancy

== Research ==
The university has 60 research units, linked with the most important French research organizations: CNRS, INSERM, INRAE and INRIA. They are organized into 10 research areas.

Among these:

- Laboratoire lorrain de recherche en informatique et ses applications (LORIA): computer sciences
- Institut Jean Lamour: material sciences

Doctoral studies are organized into 8 doctoral schools, where 400 thesis are defended annually. The 1,800 PhD students come from 90 different nationalities.

== Libraries ==
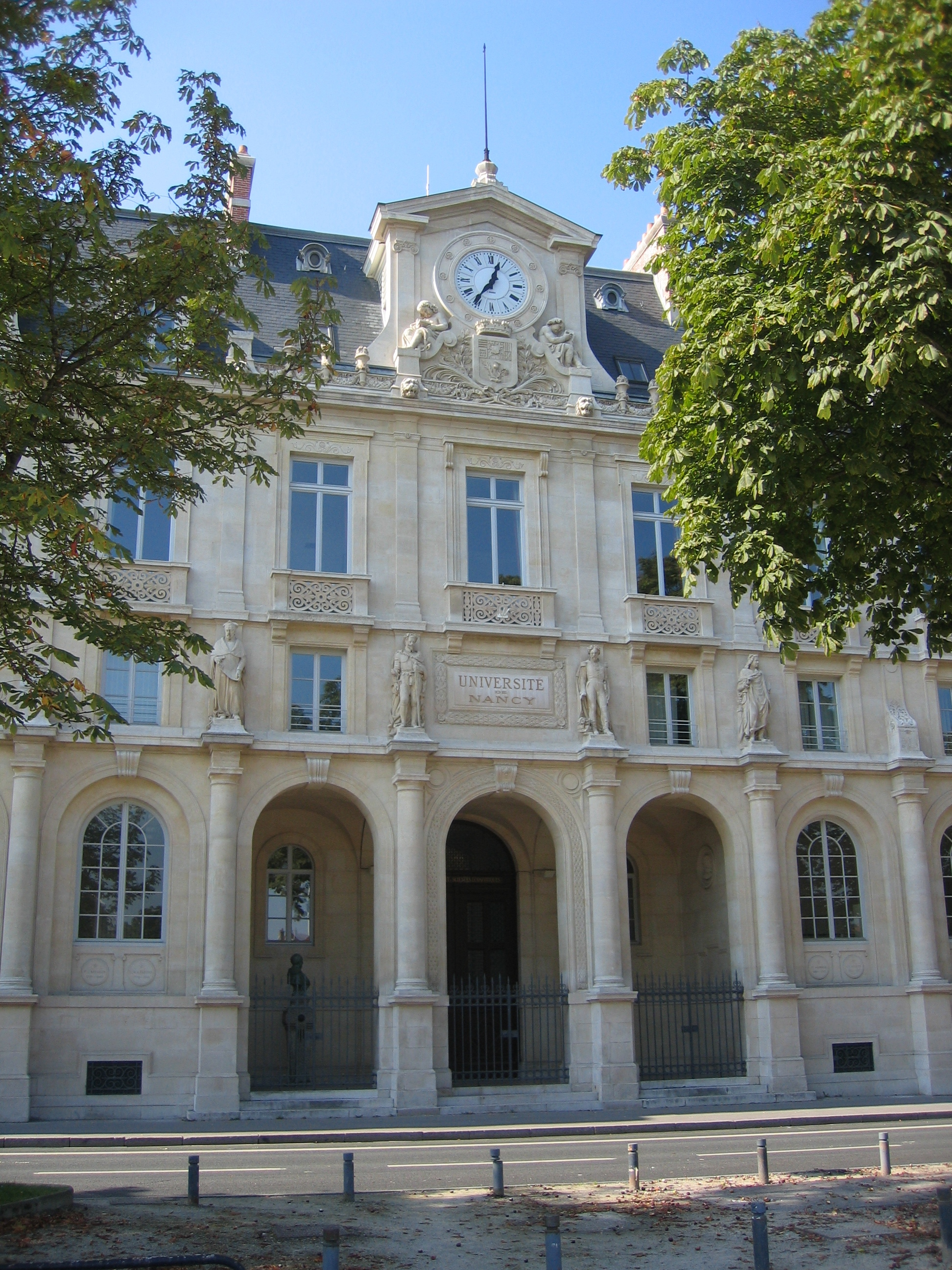
Faculty of Law, Economics and Management in Nancy

The university has a network of 25 libraries, managed by the Documentation department.

== Culture and museums ==
University of Lorraine operates several arts and scientific places and museums, and a botanic garden: Le préau, national theater Espace Bernard-Marie Koltès, Maison pour la Science en Lorraine, Musée archéologique, Aquarium Museum, Musée de l’Histoire du Fer, Jardin Botanique Jean-Marie-Pelt. The last three are co-operated with the Metropole of Grand Nancy.

== Rankings ==
University of Lorraine undergraduate law program is ranked 5th of France by Eduniversal, with 3 stars (2016/17).

According to Academic Ranking of World Universities (ARWU) 2021, University of Lorraine is ranked first European University in the subject Mining & Mineral Engineering.

University rankings

Global – Overall
- ARWU World: 201–300 (2025)
- QS World: 751-760 (2026)
- THE World: 601–800 (2024)
- USNWR Global: =455 (2026)

== Heraldry ==
In 2021, the University of Lorraine assumed a coat of arms, viz. "Sable, two open books Argent in chief, in base an escutcheon Or charged with a bend Gules bearing three alerions Argent."

== Notable people ==
- François Gény (1861–1959), French professor and jurist who introduced notion of "free scientific research" in positive law.
- Victor Grignard (1871-1935) was a researcher and a teacher at the university when he won the Nobel Prize in Chemistry in 1912.
- Laurent Schwartz (1915-2002) was a researcher and teacher at the university when he received the Fields Medal in 1950.
- Jean-Pierre Serre (born 1926) was a "maître de conférences" (MCF) at the university when he received the Fields Medal in 1954.
- Alexander Grothendieck (1928-2014), alumni that later became the leading figure in the creation of modern algebraic geometry.
