= École nationale supérieure d'agronomie et des industries alimentaires =

Engineering school in Vandoeuvre-lès-Nancy, France

Coordinates: 48.6520°N 6.1474°E

The École Nationale Supérieure d'Agronomie et des Industries Alimentaires (French pronunciation: [ekɔl nɑsjɔnal sypeʁjœʁ daɡʁɔnɔmi e dez‿ɛ̃dystʁi alimɑ̃tɛːʁ]; ENSAIA) is a French engineering school located in Vandoeuvre-lès-Nancy near Nancy, Meurthe-et-Moselle, that specialises in biological and agricultural engineering.

Students can enter the school in different ways, but the most common is by a two-year preparation class.
