= EcoCAR =

Yearly competition from 2008 to 2011

An international university competition which challenges teams to lead in the development of advanced automotive technologies

EcoCAR: The NeXt Challenge was a yearly competition from 2008 to 2011, that built on the 19-year history of U.S. Department of Energy (DOE) advanced vehicle technology competitions by giving engineering students the chance to design and build advanced vehicles to demonstrate cutting-edge automotive technologies, with the goal of minimizing the environmental impact of future personal transportation. The DOE has again joined General Motors (GM), the Government of Canada (Transport Canada, Natural Resources Canada), and other sponsors for this new competition series, named the EcoCAR Challenge. Argonne National Laboratory, a DOE research and development facility, will organize and operate the EcoCAR Challenge. Some previous types of advanced vehicle technology competitions include FutureTruck, FutureCar, and Challenge X. these types of competitions are usually supported by one or more of the Big Three American Automobile Manufacturers.

== Background on EcoCAR ==
The DOE announced a Notice of Program Interest for North American colleges and universities with accredited engineering programs to compete for the opportunity to participate in EcoCAR: The NeXt Challenge—a new international collegiate vehicle engineering competition—through a request-for-proposal (RFP) process in 2008.

EcoCAR seeks to advance the level of vehicle technology capable of reducing petroleum consumption and greenhouse gas (GHG) emissions while demonstrating the real-world performance of a range of technology options. Schools interested in receiving an RFP describing in detail the requirements for competing for one of the up to 17 available slots in EcoCAR were invited to express their interest.

== Technology Development ==
The technologies explored in EcoCAR are identical to those being investigated by the automotive industry to meet the demands of improved energy efficiency and dramatic reductions in Greenhouse gas (GHG)s, as well as to address California zero-emissions vehicle (ZEV) regulations. These technologies include full-function electric, hybrid, plug-in hybrid, and fuel cell hybrid vehicles. The only fuels approved for use in EcoCAR are E10 ethanol, E85 ethanol, B20 biodiesel, compressed gaseous hydrogen, and the energy carrier electricity.

Teams selected will design and integrate advanced-technology powertrains, lightweight materials, and aerodynamic improvements into a production vehicle. Using this approach, EcoCAR will explore pathways for future vehicles while giving the student participants the knowledge and experience they need to rapidly develop critical engineering skills and become the next generation of leaders in the automotive industry.

EcoCAR is based on a real-world integrated vehicle design and development process. Teams of engineers from the selected schools will develop their vehicles following a modified GM Global Vehicle Development Process (GVDP) for each phase of the three-year competition. By the end of the competition, the sponsors expect fully developed vehicles equivalent to prototypes ready for a production decision. While applying proven methods for engineering successful prototype vehicles, students will learn real-world engineering skills that will make them highly effective in the automotive industry. At the conclusion of each of EcoCAR’s three years, a week-long competition involving all of the participating schools will take place at a GM vehicle proving ground or other appropriate location in North America.

== Participation ==
Virginia Tech's Team Leader, Adam Robinson, accepting GM's Seed Money

Teams will receive $10,000 in seed money in Year One, a wide range of powertrain components, a vehicle donated by GM, and technical and mentoring support from the competition sponsors. EcoCAR teams will also have a GM mentor knowledgeable in technologies relevant to the team assigned to assist them during the competition. Substantial funds will also be provided to each university to support a full-time graduate student who will provide the team with leadership and continuity over the three-year program.

Schools will be required to match cash seed money donations from EcoCAR sponsors and to provide class credit for students participating in the competition, release time equal to at least one class per semester for a faculty advisor from the engineering school, and logistical and promotional support for their team. Teams may also be asked to match seed money each year to support a full-time, graduate-level engineering team leader. A signed letter of support will be required from the Dean of the Engineering Department with each proposal. If accepted into EcoCAR, each school will be required to sign an annual Good Faith Agreement reaffirming the school's full support of their team and explicitly stating its willingness to participate in all EcoCAR activities with at least one faculty advisor in attendance.

== Outreach ==
Virginia Tech team members Mark Meyer, left, and Graham Burkholder, right, show how their hybrid controller works to interested middle school students.

As part of the competition, EcoCAR teams are required to participate in different types of outreach events. These events include things such as press releases, community outreach, K-12 education, etc. Each team is asked to reach out to their communities and get them interested in EcoCAR.

== Results ==
In Year One (2009), teams use modeling and simulation to develop their vehicle architecture. In Year Two (2010), designs are turned into functioning prototype vehicles. In Year Three (2011), Vehicles are refined to "Near Showroom Quality". Year Three was the final year of the EcoCAR: The NeXt Challenge competition, succeeded by EcoCAR 2, and EcoCAR 3

Year One Results
Place	Team
1st	Ohio State University
2nd	University of Victoria
3rd	Mississippi State University

Year Two Results
Place	Team
1st	Mississippi State University
2nd	Virginia Tech
3rd	Penn State

Year Three Results
Place	Team
1st	Virginia Tech
2nd	Ohio State University
3rd	University of Waterloo

== Sponsors ==
=== Headline ===
- U.S. Department of Energy 500kg
- General Motors Company

=== Diamond ===
- Government of Canada
  - Transport Canada
  - Natural Resources Canada
- California Air Resources Board

=== Platinum ===
- dSPACE Inc.
- National Instruments
- The MathWorks
- Freescale Semiconductor
- A123 Systems
- United States Environmental Protection Agency

=== Gold ===
- National Science Foundation
- Woodward MotoTron Control Solutions
- Vector CANtech
- Sensors Inc.
- Robert Bosch LLC

=== Silver ===
- Snap-On, Inc.
- Renewable Fuels Association
- Magna International/Magna Powertrain

=== Bronze ===
- Siemens Digital Industries Software
- Delphi Foundation
- igus
- Women in the Winner's Circle
- Ecomotors
- CarSim by Mechanical Simulation Corporation (acquired by Applied Intuition)
- Electric Power Research Institute

== Universities Competing in EcoCAR: The NeXt Challenge ==
17 universities competed in the three-year span competition EcoCAR: The NeXt Challenge. (Note: Howard University only competed between 2008-2009.)

- Embry-Riddle Aeronautical University (Daytona Beach, FL) Team Website
- Georgia Institute of Technology (Atlanta, GA) Team Website
- Howard University (Washington, D.C.)
- Michigan Technological University (Houghton, MI)
- Mississippi State University (Starkville, MS) Team Website
- Missouri University of Science and Technology (Rolla, MO)
- North Carolina State University (Raleigh, NC)
- Ohio State University (Columbus, OH) Team Website
- Pennsylvania State University (University Park, PA) Team Website
- Rose-Hulman Institute of Technology (Terre Haute, IN) Team Website
- Texas Tech University (Lubbock, TX) Team Website
- University of Ontario Institute of Technology (Oshawa, Ontario, Canada) Team Website
- University of Victoria (Victoria, British Columbia, Canada) Team Website
- University of Waterloo (Waterloo, Ontario, Canada)
- University of Wisconsin–Madison (Madison, WI)
- Virginia Tech (Blacksburg, VA) Team Website
- West Virginia University (Morgantown, WV)
