= List of pitch and putt national associations =

The sport of pitch and putt, a form of golf, is organised at national level in many countries. National associations may be affiliated to the International Pitch and Putt Association (founded in 2009); or the Federation of International Pitch and Putt Associations (founded in 2006); and in Europe, the European Pitch and Putt Association (formed in 2000).

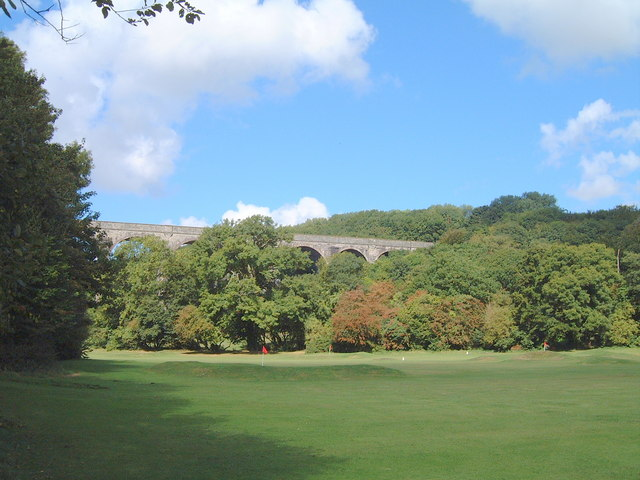
A pitch and putt course at Porthkerry in Wales

== Andorra ==
Pitch and putt in Andorra is managed by the Associació Andorrana de Pitch and Putt, and is played on two courses -"El Torrent" and "Vall d'Ordino". Andorra was the runner-up in the 2006 Pitch and putt World Cup. In the European Championships they have reached fifth place twice (2007 and 2010)

== Australia ==
Pitch and putt in Australia is managed by the Australian Pitch and Putt Association (APPA), one of the founders of the Federation of International Pitch and Putt Associations (FIPPA). Australia has played two World Cups, reaching 13th place in 2006 and eighth place in 2008.

== Belgium ==
Belgium participated for the first time in the World Cup in the third edition, played in Papendal.

== Catalonia ==
Pitch and putt in Catalonia, Spain, is managed by the Catalan Federation of Pitch and putt (FCPP) and has been played since the eighties when Martin Withelaw build a course in Solius (Santa Cristina d'Aro). In 2007 the number of federated players was more than 14,000.

In 1999 the "Associació Catalana de Pitch and putt" was one of the founders of the European Pitch and Putt Association, the governing body that develops the pitch and putt in Europe and stages a European Team Championship, where Catalonia has won in 2010.

In 2006 the "Federació Catalana de Pitch and putt" participated in the creation of the Federation of International Pitch and Putt Associations (FIPPA), that stages a biennial World Cup Team Championship. Catalonia has won 2 World Cups (2004 and 2006) and one European Championship (2010).

== Chile ==
Pitch and putt in Chile is managed by the Federación Chilena de Pitch and Putt (FCPP).

"Federación Chilena de Pitch and Putt" is one of the founders of the Federation of International Pitch and Putt Associations (FIPPA). Chile has played twice in the Pitch and Putt World Cup, placing 8th in 2006 and 5th in 2008.

== Denmark ==
Pitch and putt in Denmark is managed by the Dansk Pitch and Putt Union (DPPU). In 2006, the "Danish Pitch & Putt Union " participated in the creation of the Federation of International Pitch and Putt Associations (FIPPA)

"Dansk Pitch and Putt Union" was one of the founders of International Pitch and Putt Association (IPPA), after vacating their associated membership of FIPPA and EPPA.

Denmark has played once the Pitch and Putt World Cup, in 2006, reaching 12th place. The first Pitch & Putt Danish Open was held at Nivå Pitch & Putt Club in 2009.

== France ==
Pitch and putt in France is managed by the Association Française de Pitch & Putt (AFPP).

In 1999 the "Association Française de Pitch & Putt" was one of the founders of the European Pitch and Putt Association, the governing body that develops the pitch and putt in Europe and stages a biennial European Team Championship, where France reached third place in 2003.

In 2006 the "Association Française de Pitch & Putt" participated in the creation of the Federation of International Pitch and Putt Associations (FIPPA), that stages a biennial World Cup Team Championship. France obtained third place in 2004.

In 2009 vacated their membership of FIPPA and EPPA and joined another international association, IPPA.

== Germany ==
Pitch and putt in Germany is managed by Deutscher Pitch & Putt Verband e.V. (DPPV).

"Deutscher Pitch & Putt Verband e.V." is associated member of the European Pitch and Putt Association, and associated member of the Federation of International Pitch and Putt Associations (FIPPA). They reached 13th place in the 2008 World Cup and 8th place in the 2010 European Championship.

== Ireland ==
Pitch and putt in Ireland is managed by Pitch and Putt Ireland (formerly known as the Pitch and Putt Union of Ireland).

The world's first pitch and putt course was established in 1936 in Fountainstown, County Cork.

Pitch and Putt Union of Ireland, later known as Pitch and Putt Ireland, was one of the founder members of the European Pitch and Putt Association (EPPA) in 1999. The EPPA is the governing body that develops the pitch and putt in Europe and stages a biennial European Team Championship. Ireland has won 5 European Championships (1999, 2001, 2003, 2005 and 2007). In 2008, Ireland won the World Cup.

Also in 2006 the Pitch and Putt Union of Ireland created the Federation of International Pitch and Putt Associations (FIPPA), that stages a biennial World Cup Team Championship.

== India ==
Pitch and putt in India is governed by the Indian Pitch and Putt Association. The Indian organisation is an associate member of the Federation of International Pitch and Putt Associations.

== Italy ==
Pitch and putt in Italy is managed by the Federazione Italiana de Pitch and Putt (FIPP).

In 1999 the "Federazione Italiana de Pitch and Putt" was one of the founders of the European Pitch and Putt Association, the governing body that develops the pitch and putt in Europe and stages a biennial European Team Championship, where Italy reached third place in 1999 and 2001.

In 2006 the "Federazione Italiana de Pitch and Putt" participated in the creation of the Federation of International Pitch and Putt Associations (FIPPA), that stages a biennial World Cup Team Championship.

In 2009, the Italian organisation vacated their membership of FIPPA and EPPA and joined another international association, IPPA.

== Netherlands ==
Pitch and putt in the Netherlands is managed by the Netherlands Federation of Pitch and putt (PPBN) "Pitch en Putt Bond Nederland".

In 1999 the first federation NPPB "Nederlandse Pitch and Putt Bond" was one of the founders of the European Pitch and Putt Association, the governing body that develops the pitch and putt in Europe and stages a biennial European Team Championship, where the Netherlands reached second place in 2005 and third in 2010.

In 2006 the "Nederlandse Pitch and Putt Bond" participated in the creation of the Federation of International Pitch and Putt Associations (FIPPA), that stages a biennial World Cup Team Championship. The Netherlands obtained the second place in 2004 and in 2008.

== Norway ==
Pitch and putt in Norway is managed by the Norges Pitch & Putt Forbund (NPPF).

"Norges Pitch & Putt Forbund" is member of the European Pitch and Putt Association, and one of the founders of the Federation of International Pitch and Putt Associations (FIPPA) in 2006.

Norway reached fourth place in the 2004 Pitch and putt World Cup and 6th place twice in the European Championships (in 2007 and 2010).

== Portugal ==
Pitch and putt in Portugal is managed by the Portuguese Golf Federation (FPG). It is one of the founders of the IPPA.

== San Marino ==
Pitch and putt in San Marino is managed by the Federazione Sanmarinese Pitch and Putt (FSPP).

"Federazione Sanmarinese Pitch and Putt" is member of IPPA, after vacating their membership of FIPPA and EPPA.

San Marino reached sixth place in the European Pitch and putt Championship in 2005 and eighth place in the Pitch and Putt World Cup in 2004.

== Spain ==
Pitch and putt in Spain is mainly played in Catalonia (more than 14000 players in 2007), where it is managed by the Catalan Federation of Pitch and putt (FCPP) and has been played since the eighties when Martin Withelaw build a course in Solius (Santa Cristina d'Aro, Girona). Catalonia, being the most important Spanish region where pitch and putt is played, is also the seat of the ASEPP, the Spanish National Association for Pitch and Putt. Other regions where it is played, though not so widely, are Valencia, Andalusia and Galicia, each with their own regional federations (AVPP, APPA, ASGAPP respectively), as well as the Canary Islands, Basque Country and Madrid, where pitch and putt is integrated into the golf regional associations.

== Switzerland ==
Pitch and putt in Switzerland is managed since 2016 by the Swiss Pitch and Putt Federation (SPPF).

"Swiss Pitch and Putt Federation" is member of the European Pitch and Putt Association and Federation of International Pitch and Putt Associations

(The former association, SPPA, was closed in 2015 which was one of the founders of the Federation of International Pitch and Putt Associations (FIPPA) in 2006.)

Switzerland reached seventh place in the 2004 World Cup and also finished in seventh place in the 2010 European Championship.

== United Kingdom ==
Pitch and putt in the UK is managed by the British Pitch and Putt Association (BPPA).

"British Pitch and Putt Association" was in 1999 one of the founders of the European Pitch and Putt Association, the governing body that develops the pitch and putt in Europe and stages a biennial European Team Championship, where Great Britain reached second place in 1999.

In 2006 the "British Pitch and Putt Association" participated in the creation of the Federation of International Pitch and Putt Associations (FIPPA), that stages a biennial World Cup Team Championship. Their best performance in the World Cup was in 2008 with a 4th place. In their six participations in the European Championships have reached a 2nd place in 1999 and a 3rd place in 2007.
