= 2012 Pitch and Putt World Cup =

IV World Cup · Pitch and putt: Ireland 2012 -
Teams	11
Host	(Republic of Ireland) Royal Meath
Date	August 24 to 26
Podium
Champions; Second place Third place Fourth place	(Republic of Ireland) Ireland; Australia; Netherlands; Norway

The 2012 Pitch and Putt World Cup was held on the Royal Meath course, Ireland, and was the fourth edition for this championship promoted by the Federation of International Pitch and Putt Associations (FIPPA), with 11 national teams. Ireland won their second World Cup after defeating Australia 5-0 in the final.

== Qualifying round ==
36 holes qualification
1.	Ireland	238
2.	Catalonia	254
3.	Australia	255
4.	Netherlands	267
5.	Great Britain	269
6.	Galicia	275
7.	Norway	280
8.	Switzerland	283
9.	Germany	285
10.	Andorra	287
11.	Chile	324
* 5 best results

== Second round ==
Places 9-11

9-11	W	D	L	PF	PA	DP
Andorra	2	0	0	8,5	1,5	+7
Germany	1	0	1	5	5	=
Chile	0	0	0	1,5	8,5	-8

9th-11th
9th-11th	Germany	1-4	Andorra

9th-11th
9th-11th	Germany	4-1	Chile

9th-11th
9th-11th	Andorra	4.5-0.5	Chile

== Final rounds ==
Quarter finals
1	Ireland	5
8	Switzerland	0
5	Great Britain	1
4	Netherlands	4
3	Australia	4
6	Galicia	1
7	Norway	3,5
2	Catalonia	1,5

Semifinals
1	Ireland	3
4	Netherlands	2
3	Australia	4,5
7	Norway	0,5

Final
1	Ireland	5
2	Australia	0

Quarterfinals
Quarterfinals	Ireland	5-0	Switzerland	August 24–25

Quarterfinals
Quarterfinals	Catalonia	1.5-3.5	Norway	August 24–25

Quarterfinals
Quarterfinals	Australia	4-1	Galicia	August 24–25

Quarterfinals
Quarterfinals	Netherlands	4-1	Great Britain	August 24–25

5-8 places
5-8 places	Catalonia	4-1	Galicia	August 25

5-8 places
5-8 places	Switzerland	3-2	Great Britain	August 25

Semifinals
Semifinals	Ireland	3-2	Netherlands	August 25

Semifinals
Semifinals	Australia	4.5-0.5	Norway	August 25

7th-8th places
7th-8th places	Great Britain	2-3	Galicia	August 26

5th-6th places
5th-6th places	Catalonia	3-2	Switzerland	August 26

3rd-4th places
3rd-4th places	Netherlands	4-1	Norway	August 26

FINAL
FINAL	Ireland	5-0	Australia	August 26

Champions
Ireland

== Final standings ==
Final standings
1	Ireland
2	Australia
3	Netherlands
4	Norway
5	Catalonia
6	Switzerland
7	Galicia
8	Great Britain
9	Andorra
10	Germany
11	Chile

== See also ==
- Pitch and Putt World Cup
