= Switzerland men's national pitch and putt team =

Switzerland
- Confederation: FIPPA, EPPA.
- Head coach: –

World Cup
- Appearances: 5 (First in 2004)
- Best result: 6th place (2012)

5
- Appearances: 5 (First in 2004)
- Best result: 5

The Switzerland men's national pitch and putt team represents Switzerland in the pitch and putt international competitions. It is managed by the Schweizerischen Pitch and Putt Verband-Swiss Pitch and Putt Association (SPPA). Since 2016 Swiss Pitch and Putt Federation (SPPF)

It is member of the European Pitch and Putt Association, and one of the founders of the Federation of International Pitch and Putt Associations (FIPPA) in 2006. Switzerland reached the 7th place in the Pitch and Putt World Cup in 2004 and the 7th place in the 2010 European Championship.

== National team ==
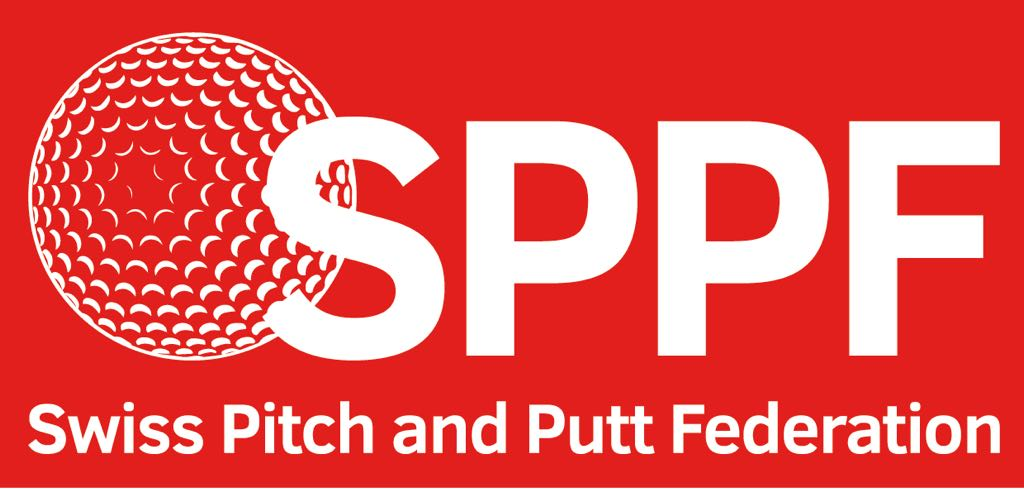
Swiss Pitch and Putt Federation Logo since 2016

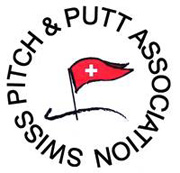
Logo from 2004 to 2015

World Cup
Year	Championship	Host	Classification
2004	1st World Cup	Chia (Italy)	7th place
2006	2nd World Cup	Teià (Catalonia)	11th place
2008	3rd World Cup	Papendal (Netherlands)	10th place
2012	4th World Cup	Royal Meath (Ireland)	6th place
2016	5th World Cup	Xixerella (Andorra)	9th place
2024	6th World Cup	El Vendrell (Catalonia)	8th place

European Championships
Year	Championship	Host	Classification
2005	4th European Championship	Overbetuwe (The Netherlands)	9th place
2007	5th European Championship	Chia (Italy)	10th place
2010	6th European Championship	Lloret de Mar (Catalonia)	7th place
2014	7th European Championship	Xixerella (Andorra)	6th place
2018	8th European Championship	Urduña (Basque Country)	9th place
2025	9th European Championship	Lucan (Irland)	6th place

== Player for the Nationalteam 2025 ==
Active players for the Swiss Pitch and Putt Nationalteam 2025.

(Switzerland) Players for the Nationalteam 2025
(Canton of Uri) Edy Planzer
(Canton of Uri) Janik Gattlen
(Canton of Lucerne) Donghua Li
(Canton of Solothurn) Dieter Heutschi
(Ticino) Claudio Naiaretti
(Ticino) Giovanni Volentik

Active players for the Swiss Pitch and Putt Nationalteam 2024.

(Switzerland) Players for the Nationalteam 2024
(Canton of Uri) Edy Planzer
(Canton of Uri) Janik Gattlen
(Canton of Lucerne) Felix Eberle
(Canton of Solothurn) Dieter Heutschi

Active players for the Swiss Pitch and Putt Nationalteam 2019.

(Switzerland) Players for the Nationalteam 2019
(Canton of Uri) Edy Planzer
(Canton of Uri) Janik Gattlen
(Canton of Uri) Markus Planzer
(Canton of Lucerne) Felix Eberle
(Canton of Solothurn) Dieter Heutschi
(Basel-Stadt) Peter Hasler
(Basel-Stadt) Peter Hasler

Active players for the Swiss Pitch and Putt Nationalteam 2018.

(Switzerland) Players for the Nationalteam 2018
(Canton of Uri) Edy Planzer
(Canton of Uri) Janik Gattlen
(Ticino) Mauro Zanini
(Ticino) Claudio Naiaretti
(Ticino) Carlo Doneda
(Canton of Glarus) Silvano Umberg

== Players at international Tournaments ==
National team in the European Strokeplay Championship 2019

- Felix Eberle
- Janik Gattlen
- Edy Planzer
- Markus Planzer
- Peter Bieri
- Peter Hasler
- Dieter Heutschi

National team in the European Championship 2018

- Janik Gattlen
- Edy Planzer
- Mauro Zanini
- Claudio Naiaretti
- Carlo Doneda
- Silvano Umberg

National team in the World Strokeplay Championship 2017

- Benedict Muff
- David Muff
- Florian Muff
- Claudio Naiaretti
- Janik Gattlen
- Markus Planzer
- Felix Eberle
- Mauro Zanini

National team in the World Cup 2016

- Edy Planzer
- Claudio Naiaretti
- Felix Eberle

National team in the European Strokeplay Championship 2015

- Felix Eberle
- Janik Gattlen
- Ueli Lamm
- Claudio Naiaretti
- Edy Planzer

National team in the European Championship 2014

- Felix Eberle
- Jürg Fux
- Silvano Umberg
- Helmut Roth
- Edy Planzer
- Erich Herger

National team in the World Cup 2012

- Ueli Lamm
- Silvano Umberg
- Helmut Roth

National team in the European Championship 2010

- Claudio Spescha
- Ueli Lamm
- Silvano Umberg
- Helmut Roth
- Edy Planzer
- Hansheiri Legler

National team in the World Cup 2008

- Claudio Specha
- Marco Bernardini
- Oliver Schumacher

National team in the European Championship 2007

- Bruno Zappa
- Ueli Lamm
- Giosuè Capone
- Marco Bernardini
- Bebbi Frisella
- Claudio Spescha

== Swiss Champions ==
Winner 2025

Janik Gattlen
Sascha Galbiati
Giovanni Volentik

Winner 2024

Dieter Heutschi
Janik Gattlen
Edy Planzer

Winner 2023

Benedikt Muff
Janik Gattlen
Sascha Galbiati

Winner 2022

Edy Planzer
Janik Gattlen
Leo Muff

Winner 2021

Janik Gattlen
Florian Muff
Edi Planzer

Netto 1. Kategorie 2021

Edi Planzer
Janik Gattlen
Felix Eberle

Winner 2020

Florian Muff
Dieter Heutschi
David Muff

Winner 2019

Benedict Muff
Florian Muff
Michel Siegenthaler, Markus Planzer, David Muff

Winner 2018

Florian Muff
Markus Planzer
Michel Siegenthaler

Winner 2017

Florian Muff
Edi Planzer
Timo Minder

Winner 2016

Erich Herger
Markus Planzer
Janik Gattlen

Winner 2015

Ueli Lamm
Daniel Wunderlin
Erich Herger

Winner 2014

Silvano Umberg
Roberto Trivella
Romano Gurini

Winner 2011

Roberto Trivella
Stefan Christoffel
Ueli Lamm

Winner 2010

Ueli Lamm

Winner 2009

Silvano Umberg
Helmut Roth
Carl Rüesch

Winner 2008

Claudio Spescha

== Captains ==
Current and former Swiss Pitch and Putt Federation Captains at international tournaments.

Name	Games	Years
Markus Planzer	1	2025
Edy Planzer	2	2018, 2024
Felix Eberle	4	2014,2015,2016,2017
Ueli Lamm	3	2007,2010,2012
Oliver Schumacher	1	2008

== Swiss Pitch&Putt Course ==
Swiss Pitch and Putt places where Member of the SPPF (Swiss Pitch and Putt Federation).

Place	Club's	Activ Member	Website
(Canton of Uri) Uri	Company Golf Seedorf (Pitch & Putt Uri)	YES	https://www.company-lodge.ch/golf/pitch-putt/
Ticino	Golf Locarno	YES	http://www.golflocarno.ch/percorso-9-buche/?lang=de
(Canton of Lucerne) Lucerne	Puplikumsgolf Rottal	YES	http://publikumsgolf-rottal.ch/index.htm
(Canton of Bern) Bern	Golf Thunersee	YES	http://www.golfthunersee.ch/anlagen/pitch-putt-platz.html
Basel-Landschaft	City Golf Bachgraben Basel	YES	https://www.citygolf.ch/
(Grisons) Graubünden	Kulm St.Moritz	Not confirmed	http://www.stmoritz-golfclub.ch/de/
(Canton of Glarus) Glarus	Golf Engi	Not confirmed	http://www.golf-glarnerland.ch/aktuell/

== See also ==
- World Cup Team Championship
- European Team Championship
