= Denmark men's national pitch and putt team =

Denmark
- Association: Dansk Pitch and Putt Union
- Confederation: IPPA

World Cup
- Appearances: 1 (First in 2006)
- Best result: 12th, 2006
- Appearances: (First in )

The Denmark men's national pitch and putt team represents Denmark in the pitch and putt international competitions. It is managed by the Dansk Pitch and Putt Union (DPPU), that was member of the European Pitch and Putt Association, and associated member of the Federation of International Pitch and Putt Associations (FIPPA).

Denmark has played once the Pitch and Putt World Cup, in 2006, with a 12th place.

In 2009, vacated their membership of FIPPA and EPPA and joined another international association, IPPA.

== National team ==
World Cup
Year	Championship	Host	Classification
2006	2nd World Cup	Teià (Catalonia)	12th place

== Players ==
National team in the World Cup 2006

- Søren Rasmussen
- Stephen Carden
- Peter Staal

== See also ==
- World Cup Team Championship
- European Team Championship
