= San Marino men's national pitch and putt team =

San Marino
- Association: Federazione Sanmarinese Pitch and Putt
- Confederation: IPPA
- Head coach: Giulio Caramaschi

World Cup
- Appearances: 3 (First in 2004)
- Best result: 8th place, 2004

3
- Appearances: 3 (First in 2003)
- Best result: 3

The San Marino men's national pitch and putt team represents san Marino in the pitch and putt international competitions. It is managed by the Federazione Sanmarinese Pitch and Putt (FSPP).

It was member of the European Pitch and Putt Association, and associated member of the Federation of International Pitch and Putt Associations (FIPPA). San Marino reached the 6th place in the European Pitch and Putt Championship in 2005 and the 8th place in the Pitch and Putt World Cup in 2004.

In 2009, vacated their membership of FIPPA and EPPA and joined another international association, IPPA.

== National team ==
World Cup
Year	Championship	Host	Classification
2004	1st World Cup	Chia (Italy)	8th place
2006	2nd World Cup	Teià (Catalonia)	11th place
2008	3rd World Cup	Papendal (Netherlands)	9th place

European Championships
Year	Championship	Host	Classification
2003	3rd European Championship	McDonagh (Ireland)	8th place
2005	4th European Championship	Overbetuwe (The Netherlands)	6th place
2007	5th European Championship	Chia (Italy)	9th place

== Players ==
National team in the World Cup 2008

- Marco Galassi
- Loris Riccardi
- Roberto Bianchi

National team in the European Championship 2007

- Giulio Caramaschi
- Emanuele Vannucci
- Massimo Lazzari
- Loris Riccardi
- Marco Galassi
- Ermanno Vergnani

== See also ==
- World Cup Team Championship
- European Team Championship
