= Italy men's national pitch and putt team =

Italy
- Association: Federazione Italiana de Pitch and Putt
- Confederation: IPPA
- Head coach: Fabrizio Frassoldati

World Cup
- Appearances: 3 (First in 2004)
- Best result: 6th place, 2004

5
- Appearances: 5 (First in 1999)
- Best result: 5

The Italy men's national pitch and putt team represents Italy in the pitch and putt international competitions. It is managed by the Federazione Italiana de Pitch and Putt (FIPP).

It was one of the founders of the European Pitch and Putt Association, the governing body that develops the pitch and putt in Europe and stages a biennial European Team Championship, where Italy reached the third place in 1999 and 2001. In 2006 participated in the creation of the Federation of International Pitch and Putt Associations (FIPPA), that stages a biennial World Cup Team Championship.

In 2009, vacated their membership of FIPPA and EPPA and joined another international association, IPPA.

== National team ==
World Cup
Year	Championship	Host	Classification
2004	1st World Cup	Chia (Italy)	6th place
2006	2nd World Cup	Teià (Catalonia)	10th place
2008	3rd World Cup	Papendal (Netherlands)	12th place

European Championships
Year	Championship	Host	Classification
1999	1st European Championship	Chelmsford (Great Britain)	3rd place
2001	2nd European Championship	Lloret (Catalonia)	3rd place
2003	3rd European Championship	McDonagh (Ireland)	5th place
2005	4th European Championship	Overbetuwe (The Netherlands)	7th place
2007	5th European Championship	Chia (Italy)	7th place

== Players ==
National team in the World Cup 2008

- Enrico Ciuffarella
- Anglo Fusco
- Vanni Rastrelli

National team in the European Championship 2007

- Enrico Ciuffarella
- Angelo Fusco
- Luigi Jannuzzellu
- Alessandro Menna
- Paolo Peretti
- Alberto Viotto

National team in the World Cup 2006

- Fabrizio Frassoldati
- Alessandro Menna
- Giuseppe Sinisi

National team in the European Championship 2005

- Antonio Trasforini
- Giovanni Trasforini
- Simona Sala
- Alessandro Menna
- Fabrizio Frassoldati
- Savino Presciutti

National team in the World Cup 2004

- Antonio Trasforini
- Simona Sala
- Alessandro Menna

== See also ==
- World Cup Team Championship
- European Team Championship
