= Norway men's national pitch and putt team =

Norway
- Association: Norges Pitch & Putt Forbund
- Confederation: FIPPA, EPPA.
- Head coach: Jo G Brand

World Cup
- Appearances: 3 (First in 2004)
- Best result: 4th place (2004)

4
- Appearances: 4 (First in 2003)
- Best result: 4

The Norway men's national pitch and putt team represents Norway in the pitch and putt international competitions. It is managed by the Norges Pitch & Putt Forbund (NPPF).

"Norges Pitch & Putt Forbund" is member of the European Pitch and Putt Association, and one of the founders of the Federation of International Pitch and Putt Associations (FIPPA) in 2006.

Norway reached the 4th place in the 2004 Pitch and putt World Cup and the 6th place in the 2007 and 2010 European Championships.

== National team ==
World Cup
Year	Championship	Host	Classification
2004	1st World Cup	Chia (Italy)	4th place
2006	2nd World Cup	Teià (Catalonia)	5th place
2008	3rd World Cup	Papendal (Netherlands)	11th place

European Championships
Year	Championship	Host	Classification
2003	3rd European Championship	McDonagh (Ireland)	7th place
2005	4th European Championship	Overbetuwe (The Netherlands)	8th place
2007	5th European Championship	Chia (Italy)	6th place
2010	6th European Championship	Lloret de Mar (Catalonia)	6th place

== Players ==
National team in the European Championship 2010:

- Bernt K. Nerland
- Anders C. Juel
- Jan Vingen
- Knut Henrik Lie
- Kenneth Vika
- Anders Olsen

National team in the World Cup 2008:

- Anders Olsen
- Toni Ede
- Jan Andersen

National team in the European Championship 2007:

- Anders Chr. Juel
- Anders Olsen
- Torbjorn S.B. Johansen
- Leif Morten Hagen
- Edvard Hatle
- Pal Andre Haugan

== See also ==
- World Cup Team Championship
- European Team Championship
