= Chile men's national pitch and putt team =

Chile
- Association: Federación Chilena de Pitch and Putt
- Confederation: FIPPA.
- Head coach: Juan Morán

World Cup
- Appearances: 2 (First in 2006)
- Best result: 5th, 2008
- Appearances: (First in )

The Chile men's national pitch and putt team represents Chile in the pitch and putt international competitions. It is managed by the Federación Chilena de Pitch and Putt (FCPP), one of the founders of the Federation of International Pitch and Putt Associations (FIPPA).

Chile reached the 5th place in the 2008 Pitch and putt World Cup.

== National team ==
World Cup
| Year | Championship | Host | Classification |
| 2006 | 2nd World Cup | Teià (Catalonia) | 8th place |
| 2008 | 3rd World Cup | Papendal (Netherlands) | 5th place |

== Players ==
National team in the World Cup 2008

- Fernando Valenzuela
- Guillermo Aranciba
- Daniel Valenzuela

National team in the World Cup 2006

- Max Valenzuela
- Guillermo Arancibia
- Juan Morán

== See also ==
- World Cup Team Championship
