= Pitch and Putt Union of Ireland =

Governing body for pitch and putt in Ireland

Pitch and Putt Ireland (Irish: Teilgin agus Amais Éireann), formerly the Pitch and Putt Union of Ireland (PPUI), is the governing body for pitch and putt in Ireland.

The sport of pitch and putt originated in County Cork in the 1930s, and developed elsewhere in Ireland throughout the 1940s. Originally governed by two separate organisations (the Irish Amateur Pitch and Putt Union in Munster, and a separate later organisation in Leinster), these formed a "united union" in 1960. This new organisation, the Pitch and Putt Union of Ireland, would later become a founding member of the European Pitch and Putt Association in 2000, and the Federation of International Pitch and Putt Associations from 2006.

The organisation runs a number of national pitch and putt competitions within Ireland, as well as coordinating entries to international competitions. The Ireland men's national pitch and putt team won the 2008 Pitch and Putt World Cup.
