= Ireland men's national pitch and putt team =

Ireland
- Association: Pitch and Putt Union of Ireland
- Confederation: FIPPA, EPPA.

World Cup
- Appearances: 5 (First in 2006)
- Best result: Champions (2008, 2012, 2016, 2024)

European Championship
- Appearances: 8 (First in 1999)
- Best result: Champions (1999, 2001, 2003, 2005, 2007, 2018, 2025)

The Ireland men's national pitch and putt team represents Ireland in the pitch and putt international competitions. It is managed by the Pitch and Putt Union of Ireland (PPUI).

It was one of the founder members of the European Pitch and Putt Association, the governing body that develops the pitch and putt in Europe and stages the European Team Championship. Ireland won the first three European Championships. The Irish team has also won the World Cup Team Championship, organised by the Federation of International Pitch and Putt Associations (FIPPA), on several of occasions.

== National team ==
World Cup
Year	Championship	Host	Classification
2002	1st World Cup	Chia (Italy)	(n/a)
2006	2nd World Cup	Teià (Catalonia)	3rd place
2008	3rd World Cup	Papendal (Netherlands)	Champions
2012	4th World Cup	Clonee (Ireland)	Champions
2016	5th World Cup	Xixerella (Andorra)	Champions
2024	6th World Cup	Tarragona (Catalonia)	Champions

European Championships
Year	Championship	Host	Classification
1999	1st European Championship	Chelmsford (Great Britain)	Champions
2001	2nd European Championship	Lloret de Mar (Catalonia)	Champions
2003	3rd European Championship	McDonagh (Ireland)	Champions
2005	4th European Championship	Overbetuwe (The Netherlands)	Champions
2007	5th European Championship	Chia (Italy)	Champions
2010	6th European Championship	Lloret de Mar (Catalonia)	2nd place
2018		Urduna (Basque)	Champions
2025		Lucan (Ireland)	Champions
