= Great Britain men's national pitch and putt team =

Great Britain
- Association: British Pitch and Putt Association
- Confederation: FIPPA, EPPA.
- Head coach: Rone Cope

World Cup
- Appearances: 3 (First in 2004)
- Best result: 4th place (2008)

6
- Appearances: 6 (First in 1999)
- Best result: 6

The Great Britain men's national pitch and putt team represents Great Britain in the pitch and putt international competitions.

It is managed by the British Pitch and Putt Association (BPPA), one of the founders of the European Pitch and Putt Association, the governing body that develops pitch and putt in Europe and stages the European Team Championship, where Great Britain reached the second place in 1999. In 2006 the "British Pitch and Putt Association" participated in the creation of the Federation of International Pitch and Putt Associations (FIPPA), that stages the World Cup Team Championship.

== National team ==
World Cup
Year	Championship	Host	Classification
2004	1st World Cup	Chia (Italy)	5th place
2006	2nd World Cup	Teià (Catalonia)	7th place
2008	3rd World Cup	Papendal (Netherlands)	4th place

European Championships
Year	Championship	Host	Classification
1999	1st European Championship	Chelmsford (Great Britain)	2nd place
2001	2nd European Championship	Lloret de Mar (Catalonia)	6th place
2003	3rd European Championship	McDonagh (Ireland)	6th place
2005	4th European Championship	Overbetuwe (The Netherlands)	4th place
2007	5th European Championship	Chia (Italy)	3rd place
2010	6th European Championship	Lloret de Mar (Catalonia)	4th place

== Players ==
National team in the European Championship 2010

- Steve Deeble
- John Deeble
- Savio Fernandes
- Jamie Deeble
- Neil Green
- Ron Cope

National team in the World Cup 2008

- Steve Deeble
- John Deeble
- Anthony O'Brien

National team in the European Championship 2007

- John Deeble
- Steve Deeble
- Anthony O'Brien
- Geoff Unwin
- Ashley Hendricks
- Blaise Fernandes

== See also ==
- World Cup Team Championship
- European Team Championship
