= France men's national pitch and putt team =

France
- Association: Association Française de Pitch & Putt
- Confederation: IPPA
- Head coach: Bernard Dinnat

World Cup
- Appearances: 3 (First in 2004)
- Best result: 3rd place, 2004

5
- Appearances: 5 (First in 1999)
- Best result: 5

The France men's national pitch and putt team represents France in the pitch and putt international competitions. It is managed by the Association Française de Pitch & Putt (AFPP).

In 1999 the "Association Française de Pitch & Putt" was one of the founders of the European Pitch and Putt Association, the governing body that develops the pitch and putt in Europe and stages a biennial European Team Championship, where France reached the third place in 2003. In 2006 participated in the creation of the Federation of International Pitch and Putt Associations (FIPPA), that stages a biennial World Cup Team Championship. France obtained the third place in 2004.

In 2009, vacated their membership of FIPPA and EPPA and joined another international association, IPPA.

== National team ==
World Cup
Year	Championship	Host	Classification
2004	1st World Cup	Chia (Italy)	3rd place
2006	2nd World Cup	Teià (Catalonia)	6th place
2008	3rd World Cup	Papendal (Netherlands)	6th place

European Championships
Year	Championship	Host	Classification
1999	1st European Championship	Chelmsford (Great Britain)	5th place
2001	2nd European Championship	Lloret (Catalonia)	4th place
2003	3rd European Championship	McDonagh (Ireland)	3rd place
2005	4th European Championship	Overbetuwe (The Netherlands)	5th place
2007	5th European Championship	Chia (Italy)	8th place

== Players ==
National team in the World Cup 2008

- Jean-Claude Richard
- Christian Auziere
- Pierre Rongier
- Manoj Chitnavis

National team in the European Championship 2007

- Jean-Claude Richard
- Jean-Louis Olesiak
- Christian Auziere
- Joel Dehove
- Adrien Delcausse
- Jean-Michel Biau

== See also ==
- World Cup Team Championship
- European Team Championship
