= Sport in Barcelona =

Barcelona, the capital of Catalonia, is the second largest city and metropolitan area in Spain and sixth-most populous urban area in the European Union. It has hosted many major international tournaments and has professional teams in different sports.

== International tournaments ==
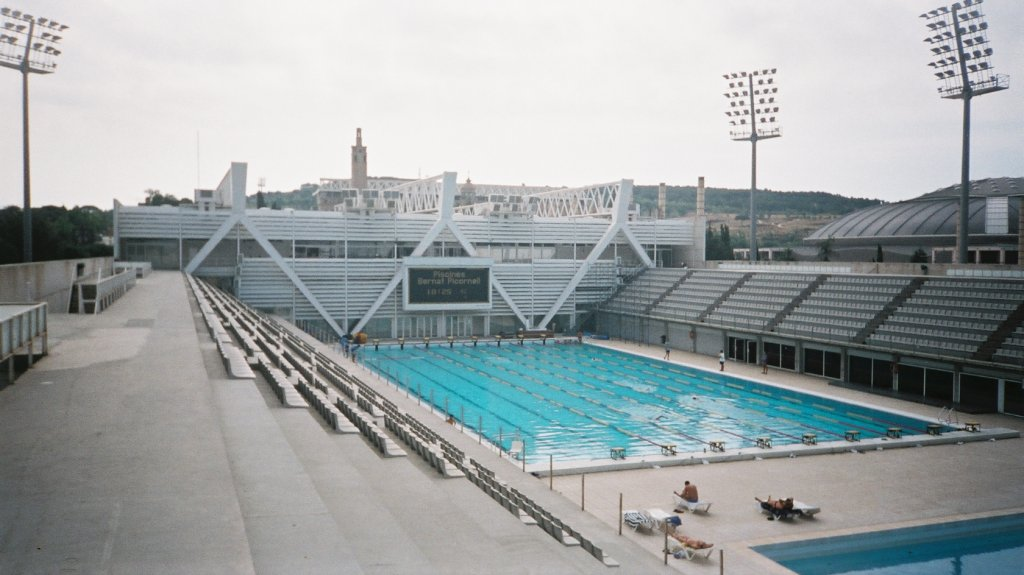
Piscines Bernat Pools, one of the arenas of the 2003 World Aquatics Championships.

Barcelona has a long sporting tradition and hosted the highly successful 1992 Summer Olympics as well as several matches during the 1982 FIFA World Cup (on the two stadiums). It has also hosted, among others:

- The final of European Champions League (1989, 1999)
- European Cup Winners' Cup (1972, 1982)
- European Super Cup (1979, 1982, 1989, 1992, 1997)
- Inter-Cities Fairs Cup (1958, 1960, 1962, 1964)
- Eurobasket (1973, 1997)
- Euroleague (1969, 1998, 2003, 2011)
- 1951, 1954, 1957, 1979 European Roller Hockey Championship
- 1955 Mediterranean Games
- 1958 European Judo Championships
- 1964 UEFA Euro (European Cup)
- 1970 European Water Polo Championship
- 1970 European Aquatics Championships
- 1971 Men's Hockey World Cup
- 1973 UCI Road World Championships
- 1976 European Taekwondo Championships
- 1980 European Karate Championships
- 1984 UCI Track Cycling World Championships
- 1984 UCI Road World Championships
- 1985 World Fencing Championships
- 1987 World Taekwondo Championships
- 1987 European Wushu Championships
- 1988 UEFA Cup
- 1989 IAAF World Race Walking Cup
- 1989 IAAF World Cup
- 1991 World Judo Championships
- 1991 FINA Men's Water Polo World Cup
- 1995 IAAF World Indoor Championships
- 1996 UEFA European Under-21 Football Championship
- 1996 FIFA Futsal World Championship
- 1996 UEFA European Under-21 Football Championship (several matches)
- 1997 World Bowl
- 2002 Euro Beach Soccer Cup
- 2002 Women's Rugby World Cup
- 2002 World Interuniversity Games
- 2003 EuroHockey Nations Championship
- 2003 World Aquatics Championships
- 2006 Men's Hockey Champions Trophy
- 2007 European Baseball Championship
- 2007 UEFA–CAF Meridian Cup
- 2010 European Athletics Championships
- 2011 CERS Cup
- FIS Snowboarding World Championships 2011
- 2013 World Men's Handball Championship
- 2013 World Aquatics Championships
- 2014 FIBA Basketball World Cup

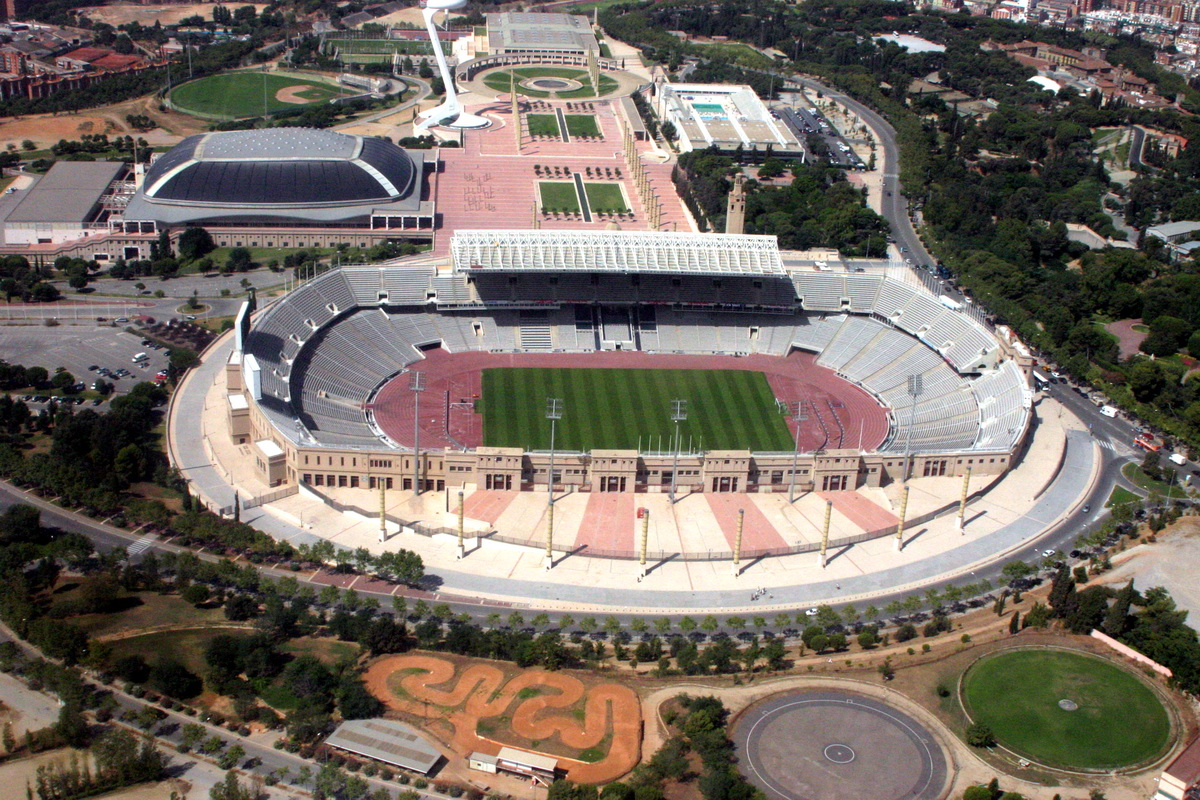
Estadi Olímpic de Montjuïc (Barcelona Olympic Stadium), built for missed the 1936 Summer Olympics (People's Olympiad) and later, main arena of 1992 Summer Olympics.

== Olympics and Paralympics ==
As alternative to the Nazi Olympics in Berlin, People's Olympiad was to be held, however because of the war, it was canceled. Barcelona hosted the 1992 Summer Olympics and 1992 Summer Paralympics.

== Sport clubs ==
Top sport clubs in Barcelona:

Club	Primary league	Sport	Venue	Established	Capacity
FC Barcelona	La Liga	Football	Camp Nou	1899	99,354
RCD Espanyol	La Liga	Football	Estadi Cornellà-El Prat	1900	40,000
FC Barcelona Bàsquet	ACB	Basketball	Palau Blaugrana	1926	7,585
FC Barcelona Handbol	Asobal	Handball	Palau Blaugrana	1942	7,585
FC Barcelona Ice Hockey	SEdHH	Ice hockey	Palau de Gel	1972	1,256
FC Barcelona Hoquei	OK Liga	Roller hockey	Palau Blaugrana	1942	7,585
FC Barcelona Futsal	Primera División de Futsal	Futsal	Palau Blaugrana	1986	7,585
FC Barcelona Rugby	División de Honor de Rugby	Rugby union	CDMVdHT	1924	500
Barcelona Dragons	World League	American football	Estadi Olímpic Lluís Companys	1991 (withheld)	54,367
Barcelona Búfals	LNFA	American football	Estadio Narcís Sala	1987	15,000

=== FC Barcelona ===
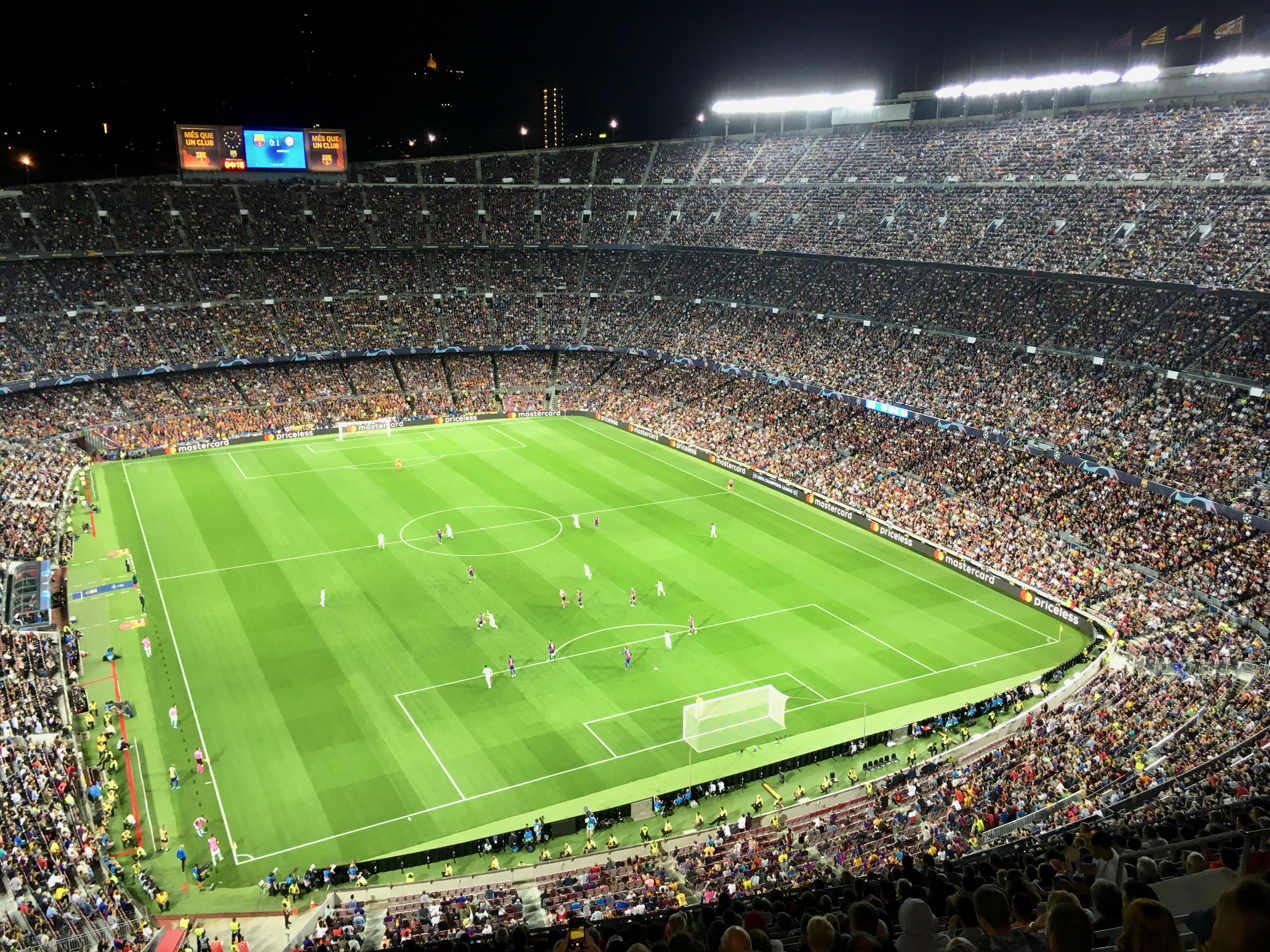
The Camp Nou, the largest stadium in Europe.

FC Barcelona is a sports club best known worldwide for its football team, one of the largest in the world and second richest football club in the world. It has 74 national honours (46 runners-up) and 16 continental (10 runners-up) trophies, including five UEFA Champions Leagues (3 runners-up) and three FIFA Club World Cups (1 runners-up). Additionally, it is the only men's club in the world to accomplish a sextuple. FC Barcelona also has teams in the Spanish basketball ACB league (Regal FC Barcelona), the handball ASOBAL league (FC Barcelona Handbol), and the roller hockey league (FC Barcelona Hoquei), all of them winners of the highest European competitions. The club's museum is the second most visited in Catalonia. Twice a season, FC Barcelona and cross-town rivals RCD Espanyol contest in the local derby in La Liga, while its basketball section has its own local derby in Liga ACB with nearby Joventut Badalona. Barcelona also has other clubs in lower categories, like CE Europa and UE Sant Andreu.

=== RCD Espanyol ===
Reial Club Deportiu Espanyol de Barcelona, or RCD Espanyol, is a football club. In 1928, Espanyol became a founding member of La Liga, and in 1929, the football team won their first Copa del Rey. Espanyol has completed the highest number of seasons in La Liga without actually winning the title. The team has qualified eight times for the UEFA Cup and reached the final in 1988, losing to Bayer Leverkusen of then-West Germany on penalty kicks (3–2).

== Stadiums and sport arenas ==
Palau Sant Jordi (St. George's sporting arena) and Montjuïc Communications Tower

Barcelona has two UEFA elite stadiums: FC Barcelona's Camp Nou, the largest stadium in Europe with a capacity of 100,000 and the publicly owned Estadi Olímpic Lluís Companys, with a capacity of 55,000; used for the 1992 Olympics. Also, the city has several smaller stadiums such as Mini Estadi, with a capacity of 15,000 and Estadio Narcís Sala, Nou Sardenya with a capacity of 7,000 and Camp de la Verneda, with a capacity of 5,500. In the suburbs of Barcelona there is a third UEFA elite stadium - Estadi Cornellà-El Prat, with a capacity of 40,000. Estadi de la Nova Creu Alta, with a capacity of 1000 is stadium on the suburbs, during the 1992 Summer Olympics it hosted six football matches. Estadi Olímpic de Terrassa, with a capacity of 11,500; Camp del Centenari, with a capacity of 10,000 and Estadi La Feixa Llarga, with a capacity of 6,700 is other stadium on the suburbs of Barcelona. Also, except Palau Sant Jordi (St. George's sporting arena), with a capacity of 12,000-24,000 (depending on use), city has two other larger sporting and concert arena: Palau Blaugrana, with a capacity of 7,500 and Palau dels Esports de Barcelona. On the suburbs lies Palau Municipal d'Esports de Badalona, with a capacity of 12,500 and Palau d'Esports de Granollers, with a capacity of 5,700, both hosted some tournaments of the 1992 Summer Olympics and also Pavelló Nou Congost, with a capacity of 5,000. Circuit de Catalunya/Circuit de Barcelona, race track of Formula 1 and MotoGP on the suburb of Barcelona has capacity of 107,000.

== Annual sporting events ==
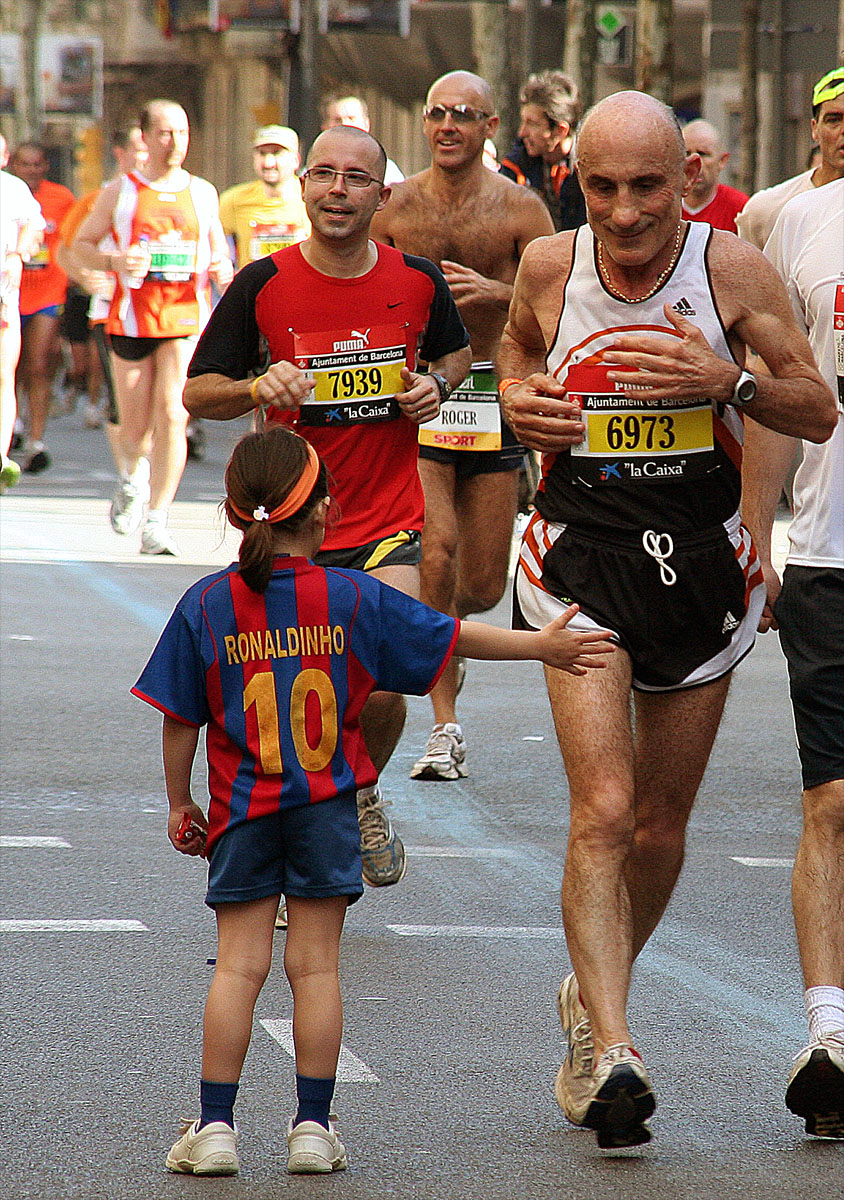
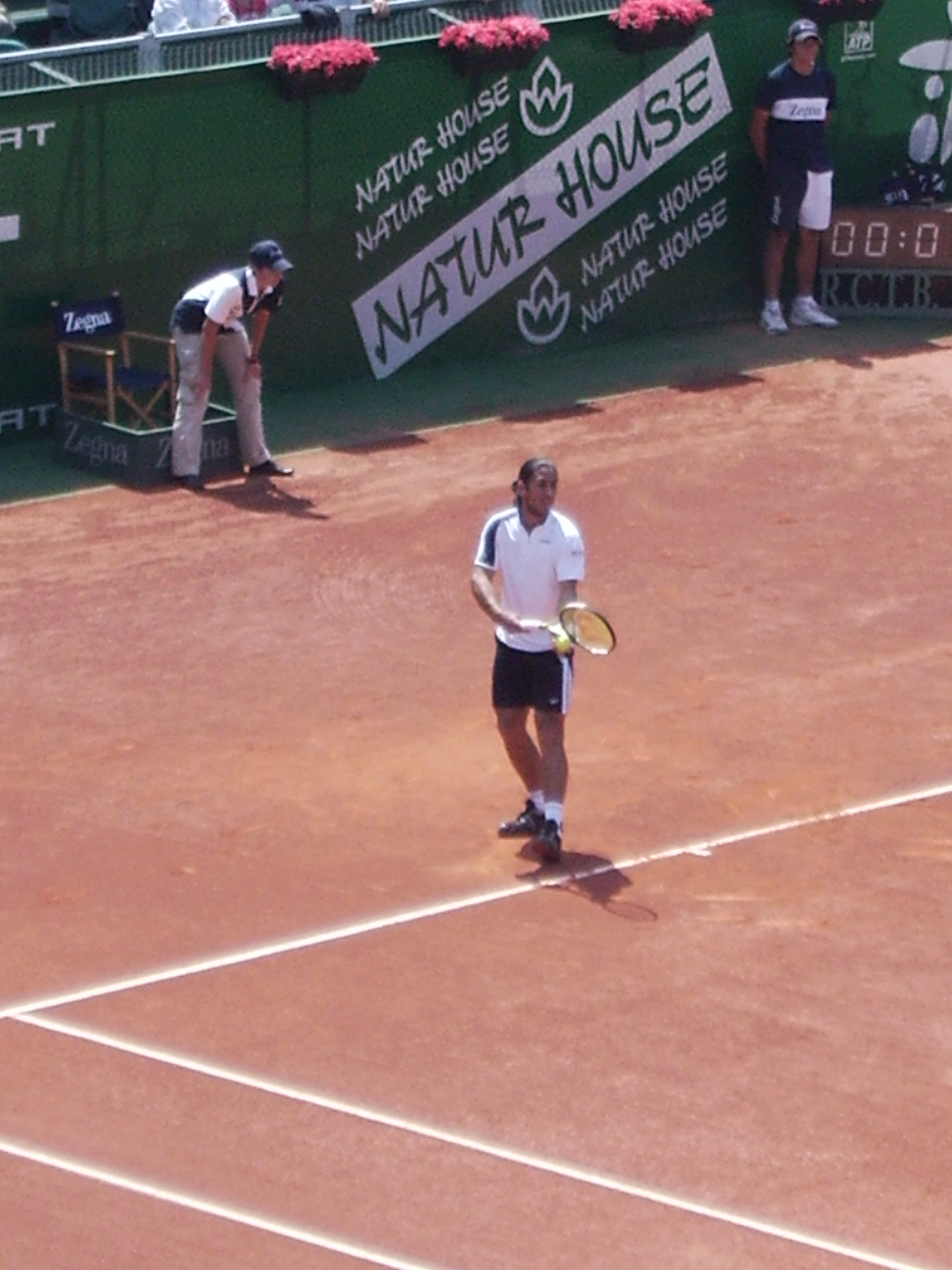
Barcelona Marathon and Barcelona Open.

=== Barcelona Marathon and Cursa de Bombers ===
Several major road running competitions are organized year-round in Barcelona: the Barcelona Marathon every March with a participants of over 10,000 in 2010, the Cursa de Bombers in April, the Cursa de El Corte Inglés in May (with about 60,000 participants each year) - this race holds IAAF Bronze Label Road Race status. Other small road running are: the Cursa de la Mercè, the Cursa Jean Bouin, the Milla Sagrada Família and the San Silvestre.

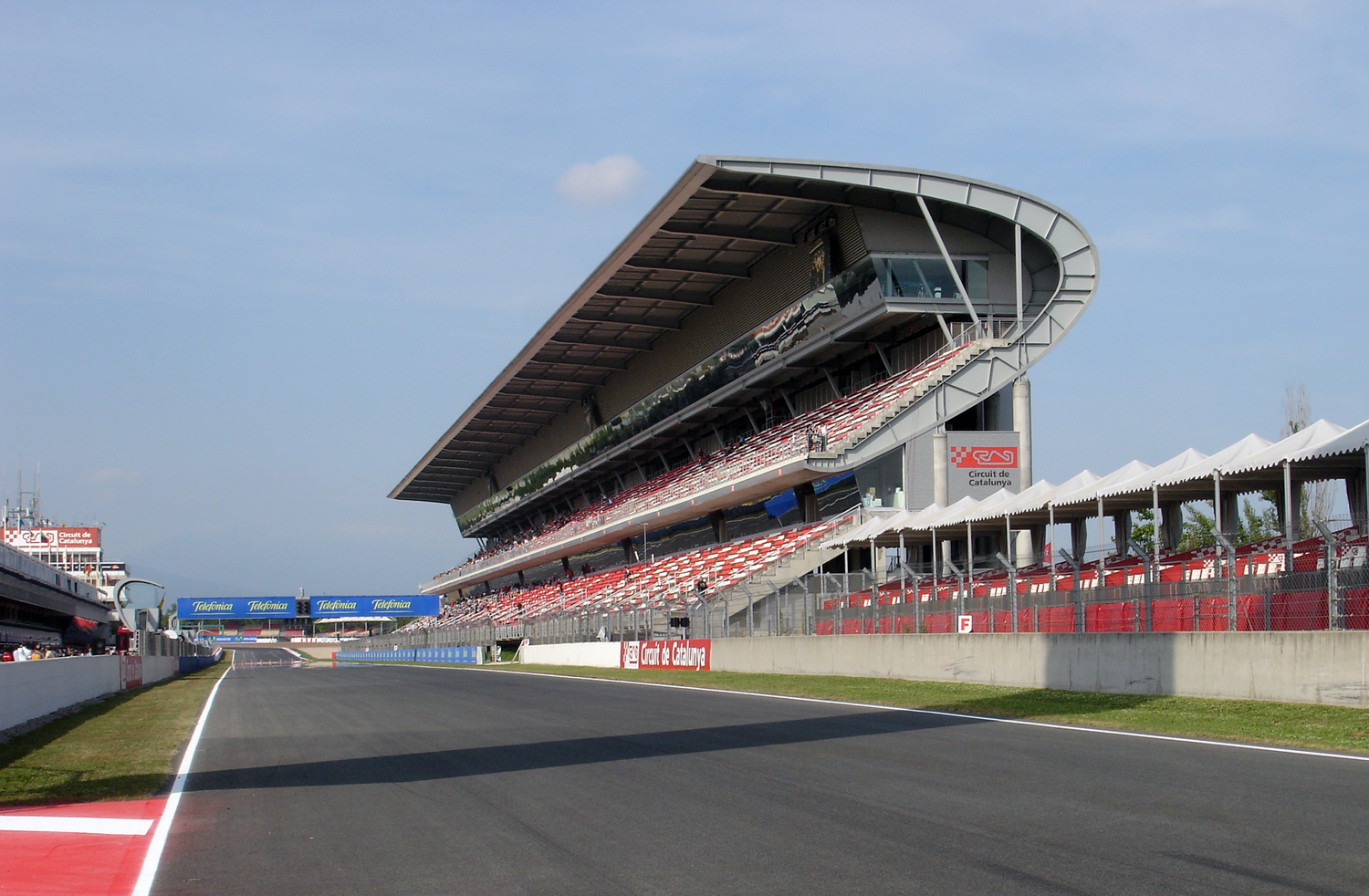
Circuit de Catalunya/Circuit de Barcelona, race track of Formula 1 and MotoGP on the suburb of Barcelona.

=== Barcelona Open ===
The Barcelona Open, a 50-year-old ATP World Tour 500 Series tennis tournament, is held annually in the facilities of the Real Club de Tenis Barcelona (Barcelona Royal Tennis Club). Also, each Christmas, a swimming race across the port is organized.

=== Formula 1 and MotoGP ===
Near Barcelona, in Montmeló, the 107,000 capacity Circuit de Catalunya / Circuit de Barcelona racetrack hosts the Formula One World Championship, Formula One Spanish Grand Prix, Catalan motorcycle Grand Prix, Spanish GT Championship and GP2 Series.

=== Aerosport ===
Aerosport is an airshow that takes place at the Igualada-Òdena aerodrome in Barcelona Province every year since 1993. It is the only Spanish airshow fully dedicated to corporate and sport aircraft. The show includes displays, demonstrations and flights of ultralight aircraft, autogyros, gliders, acrobatic aircraft, paramotors, helicopters, amateur aircraft, aeronautical accessories, flight training schools, clubs and a secondhand market.

== Other ==
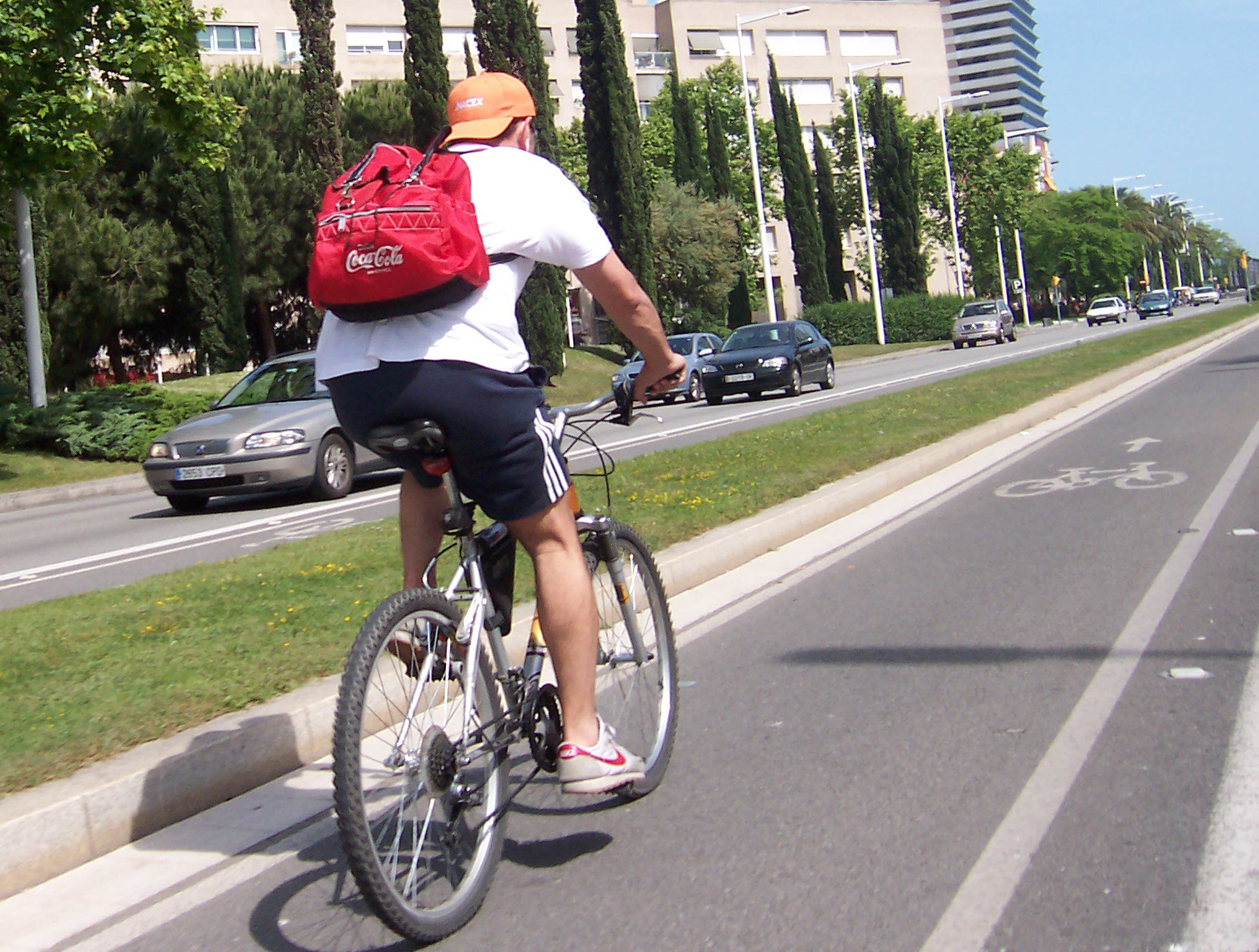
Cycling is very popular in Barcelona.

=== Barcelona World Race ===
Barcelona World Race is a non-stop, round-the-world yacht race for crews of two, sailed on Open 60 IMOCA monohull boats.

=== Other ===
Skateboarding and bicycling are also very popular in Barcelona. In the city and the metropolitan area, there are tens of kilometers of bicycle paths.

=== Circuit ===
In the suburbs lies Parcmotor Castellolí (es) motor racing track. Also, Montjuïc circuit is a former street circuit located on the Montjuïc mountain in Barcelona. Pedralbes Circuit was street racing course near Barcelona. Sitges Terramar is a former racing circuit located between Sant Pere de Ribes and Sitges near Barcelona.

== Gallery ==
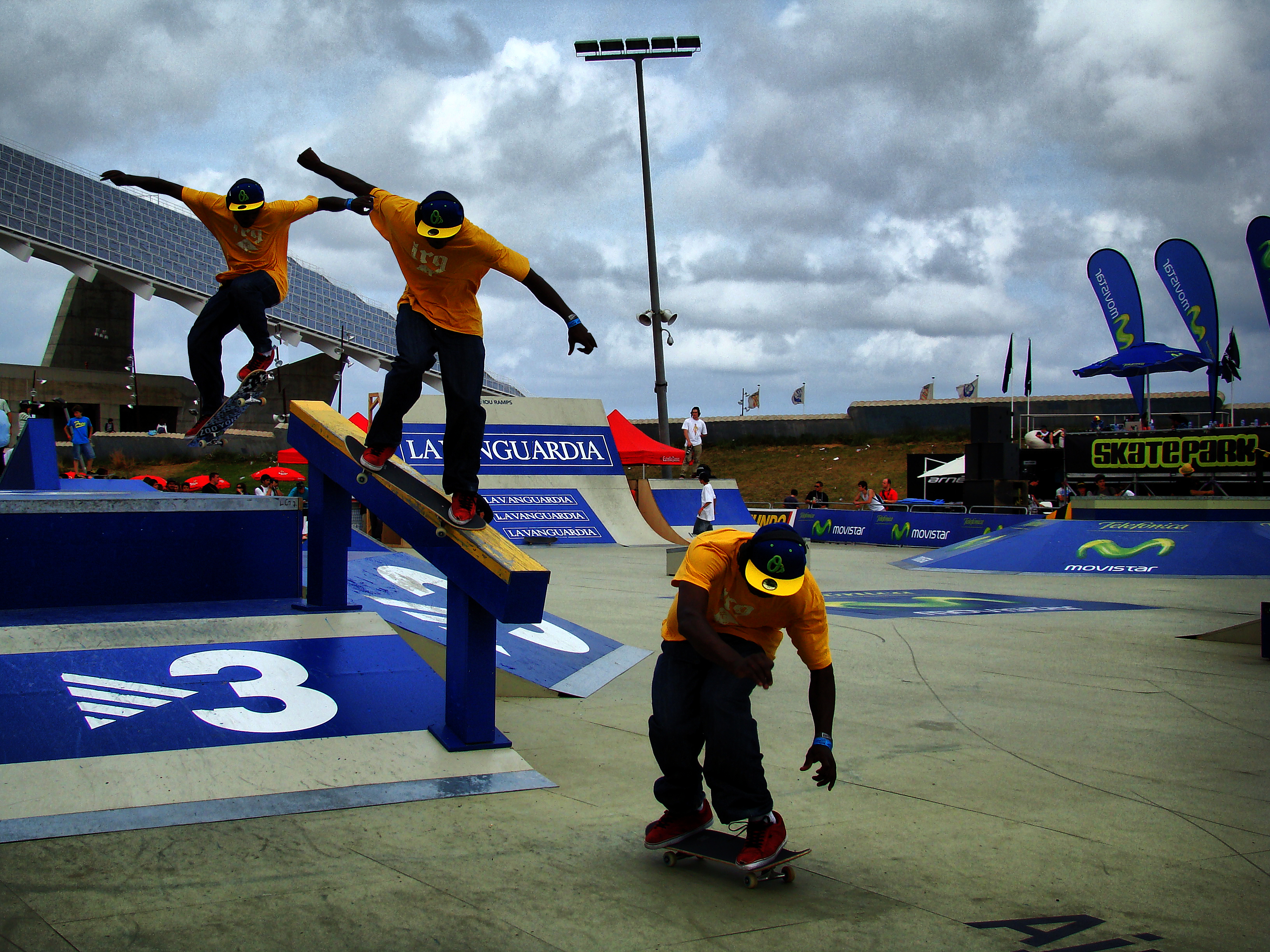
Skatepark in Barcelona

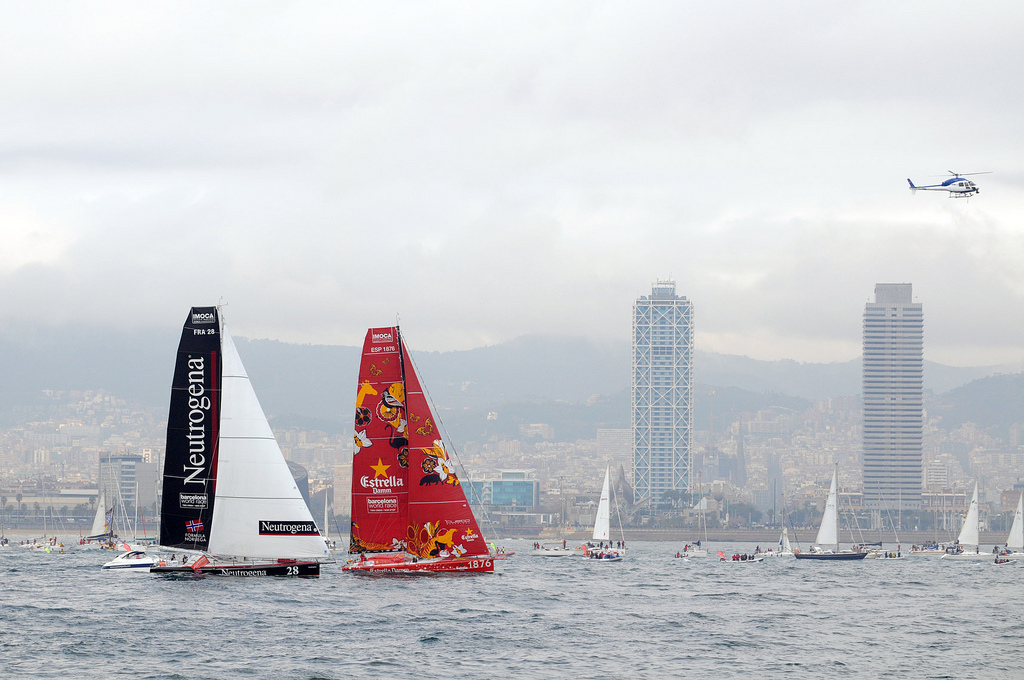
Barcelona World Race, winter 2011

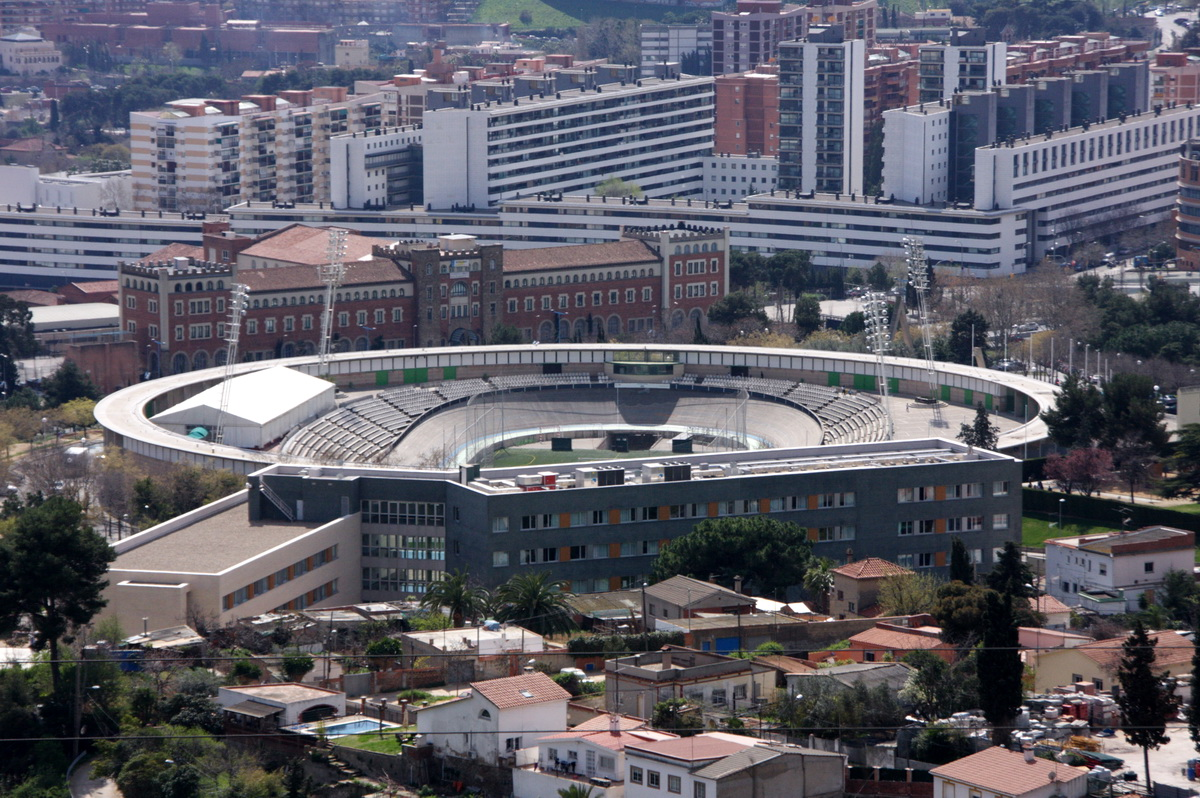
Velòdrom d'Horta, velodrome/track cycling venue

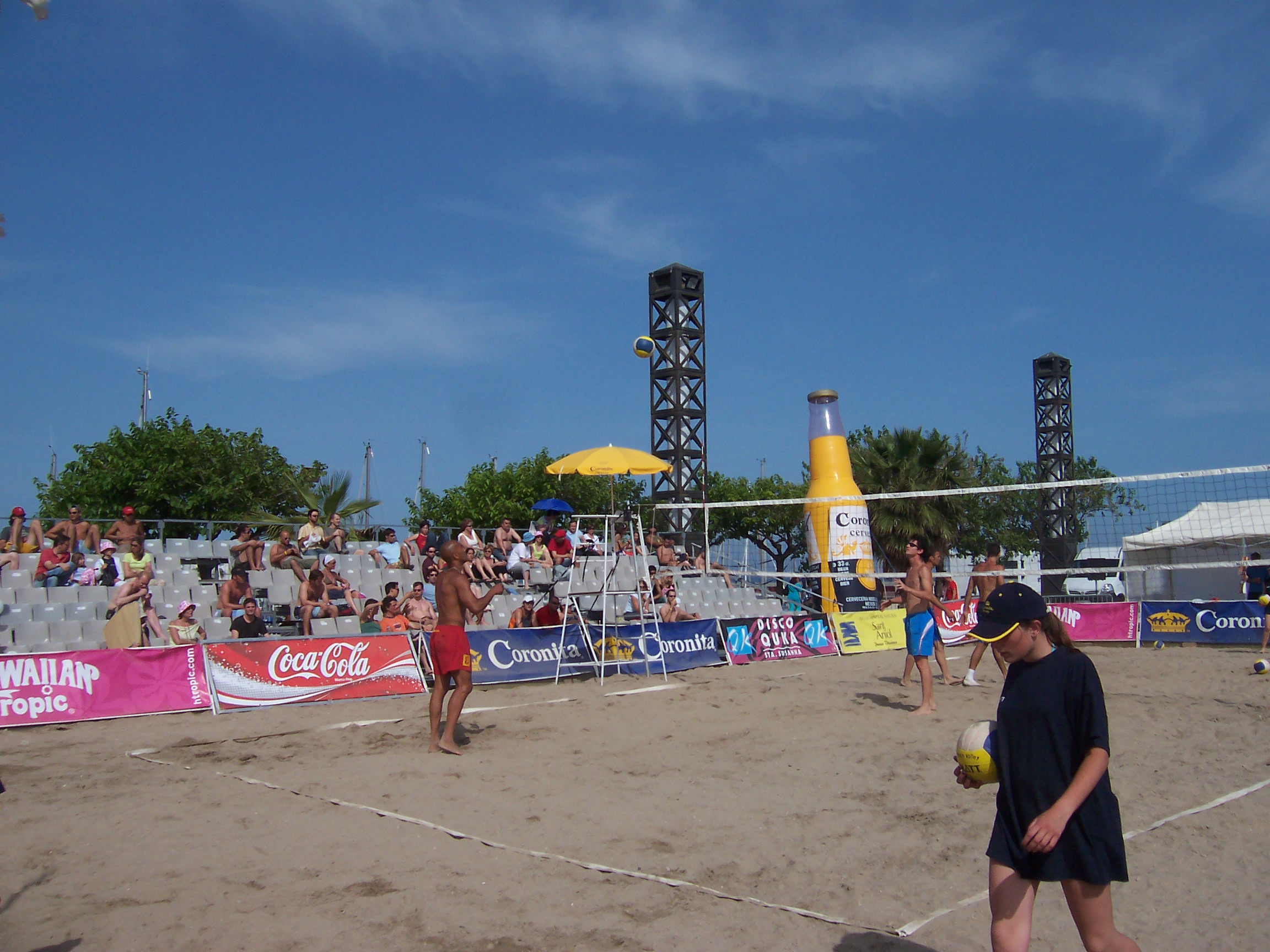
Beach volleyball at Port Olympic, in Barcelona
