= Germany men's national pitch and putt team =

Germany
- Association: DPPV – DEUTSCHER PITCH & PUTT VERBAND e.V.
- Confederation: EPPA.
- Head coach: Sven Göth, Max Hergt – Management

World Cup
- Appearances: 1 (First in 2008)
- Best result: 13th place (2008)

1
- Appearances: 1 (First in 2010)
- Best result: 1

Germany men's national Pitch and Putt team represents Germany in Pitch and putt international competitions.

It is managed by the DPPV – DEUTSCHER PITCH & PUTT VERBAND e.V. and the GPPGA – German Pitch & Putt Golf Agency.

It is an associated member of the European Pitch and Putt Association since 2008. Germany reached the 13th place in the 2008 Pitch and putt World Cup and the 8th plance in the 6th European Championship in 2010.

== National team ==
World Cup
Year	Championship	Host	Classification
2008	3rd World Cup	Papendal (Netherlands)	13th place

European Championships
Year	Championship	Host	Classification
2010	6th European Championship	Lloret de Mar (Catalonia)	8th place

== Players ==
National team in the European Championship 2010

- Manfred Kolvenbach
- Harald Brinkmeyer
- Philipp von Witzendorff
- Sven Göth
- Max Hergt

National team in the World Cup 2008

- Heiko Tigges
- Ralf Kerkeling
- Silvio Dietz

== See also ==
- World Cup Team Championship
- European Team Championship
