= 2000 World Interuniversity Games =

II World Interuniversity Games Amsterdam 2000
- Host city: Amsterdam, Netherlands
- Nations: 54
- Athletes: 12,090
- Events: 23
- Opening: November 2, 2000
- Closing: November 30, 2000
- Opened by: Beatrix
- Main venue: Olympic Stadium

The 2000 World Interuniversity Games were the second edition of the Games (organised by IFIUS), and were held in Amsterdam, the Netherlands.
