= 2007 Pitch and putt European Championship =

V European Championship · Pitch and putt: Italy 2007 -
Teams	10
Host	(Italy) Chia
Date	October 19 to 21 2007
Podium • Champion • Runner up • Third place • Fourth place	(Republic of Ireland) Ireland; Catalonia (United Kingdom) Great Britain; The Netherlands

The 2007 Pitch and putt European Teams Championship held in Chia (Italy) was organized by the Federazione Italiana Pitch and Putt and promoted by the European Pitch and Putt Association (EPPA), with 10 teams in competition. Ireland won their fifth title.

== Teams ==
(Republic of Ireland) Ireland
Ray Murphy
Liam O'Donovan
Derek Courtney
Paul O'Brien
William Buckley
Sean Downes

Catalonia
Marc Lloret
Joan Poch
Fernando Cano
Jordi Serra
David Solé
Daniel Coleman

(United Kingdom) Great Britain
John Deeble
Steve Deeble
Anthony O'Brien
Geoff Unwin
Ashley Hendricks
Blaise Fernandes

The Netherlands
Rolf Kwant
Patrick Lunning
Karl Bergh
Lennart Swennenhuis
Jan Tijhuis
Henrik Koetsier

Andorra
Antoni Armengol
Marc Armengol
Guillem Escabrós
Ivan Sanz
Ferran da Silca
Francesc Gaset

Norway
Anders Chr. Juel
Anders Olsen
Torbjorn S.B. Johansen
Leif Morten Hagen
Edvard Hatle
Pal Andre Haugan

Italy
Enrico Ciuffarella
Angelo Fusco
Luigi Jannuzzellu
Alessandro Menna
Paolo Peretti
Alberto Viotto

France
Jean-Claude Richard
Jean-Louis Olesiak
Christian Auziere
Joel Dehove
Adrien Delcausse
Jean-Michel Biau

San Marino
Giulio Caramaschi
Emanuele Vannucci
Massimo Lazzari
Loris Riccardi
Marco Galassi
Ermanno Vergnani

Switzerland
Bruno Zappa
Ueli Lamm
Giosuè Capone
Marco Bernardini
Bebbi Frisella
Claudio Spescha

== Qualifying round ==
36 holes qualifying
1.	(Republic of Ireland) Ireland	497
2.	Catalonia	505
3.	The Netherlands	522
4.	France	534
5.	(United Kingdom) Great Britain	537
6.	Italy	544
7.	Andorra	550
8.	Norway	550
9.	San Marino	583
10.	Switzerland	584
* 5 best results

== Final Rounds ==
Quarter finals
1	(Republic of Ireland) Ireland	8,5
8	Norway	0,5
5	(United Kingdom) Great Britain	4,5*
4	France	4,5
3	The Netherlands	6
6	Italy	3
7	Andorra	0
2	Catalonia	9

Semifinals
1	(Republic of Ireland) Ireland	7,5
5	(United Kingdom) Great Britain	1,5
3	The Netherlands	2
2	Catalonia	7

Final
1	(Republic of Ireland) Ireland	6,5
2	Catalonia	2,5

Quarterfinals
Quarterfinals	Ireland	8,5-0,5	Norway	October 20, 2007

Quarterfinals
Quarterfinals	France	4,5-4,5*	Great Britain	October 20, 2007

Quarterfinals
Quarterfinals	The Netherlands	6-3	Italy	October 20, 2007

Quarterfinals
Quarterfinals	Catalonia	9-0	Andorra	October 20, 2007

5-8 places
5-8 places	France	3,5-5,5	Norway	October 20, 2007

5-8 places
5-8 places	Italy	2,5-6,5	Andorra	October 20, 2007

Semifinals
Semifinals	Ireland	7,5-1,5	Great Britain	October 20, 2007

Semifinals
Semifinals	Catalonia	7-2	The Netherlands	October 20, 2007

7th-8th places
7th-8th places	France	4-5	Italy	October 21, 2007

5th-6th places
5th-6th places	Andorra	5-4	Norway	October 21, 2007

3rd-4th places
3rd-4th places	The Netherlands	4,5-4,5*	Great Britain	October 21, 2007

FINAL
FINAL	Ireland	6,5-2,5	Catalonia	October 21, 2007

Champions
IRELAND

== Final standings ==
Final Standings
1	(Republic of Ireland) Ireland
2	Catalonia
3	(United Kingdom) Great Britain
4	The Netherlands
5	Andorra
6	Norway
7	Italy
8	France
9	San Marino
10	Switzerland

== See also ==
- European Pitch and putt Championship
