= IFIUS =

International Federation for Interuniversity Sport
- Abbreviation: IFIUS
- Formation: 1998
- Dissolved: 2011
- Headquarters: Antwerp (Belgium)
- Region served: Worldwide
- Members: Universities & Colleges
- Official language: English
- President: Dr. B. Ghadimi (Islamic Azad University)
- Main organ: General Assembly
- Affiliations: Panathlon International
- Website: www.ifius.com

IFIUS (International Federation for Interuniversity Sport) was a democratic non-profit organisation whose main objective was to organise the yearly World Interuniversity Games, in which teams of students from different universities and colleges worldwide competed in different sport competitions. In 2011, IFIUS was disbanded and integrated into Panathlon.

== History ==
Until 2003 the games were held on weekends during the year. From 2004 they were held in a one-week period in October.

== Competitions ==
Official competitions included:

- Football Men
- Football Women
- Futsal Men
- Basketball Men
- Basketball Women
- Volleyball Men
- Volleyball Women
- Golf and Pitch & putt
- Individual golf
- Individual pitch and putt

●	Competitions held	●	Competitions expected

Sport	1999	2000	2001	2002	2003	2004	2005	2006	2007	2008	2009	2010	2011	2012	2013
Football Men															
Football Women															
Futsal Men															
Basketball Men															
Basketball Women															
Volleyball Men															
Volleyball Women															
Golf and Pitch&Putt															
Individual golf															
Individual pitch and putt															

== Objectives ==
The main IFIUS objectives were:
(1) Offer each student in the world the opportunity to compete on an international interuniversity sports level.
(2) Protect the rights of interuniversity sports playing students and universities.
(3) Promote international interuniversity sports in every way it deems fit.

== IFIUS Games ==
Year	Games	Host city	Host University	Remarks
1999	1	Antwerp, Belgium	(none)	Only Football Men competition
2000	2	Paris, France	(none)	Football Women competition added
2001	3	Amsterdam, the Netherlands	(none)	
2002	4	Barcelona, Spain	Autonomous University of Barcelona	
2003	5	Rome, Italy	(none)	Futsal Men competition added
2004	6	Antwerp, Belgium	University of Antwerp	
2005	7	Rotterdam, the Netherlands	INHolland university of applied sciences co-hosts: Erasmus University; Hogeschool Rotterdam	Basketball Men competition added
2006	8	(Republic of Ireland) Dublin, Ireland	University College Dublin co-host: Dublin City University	Volleyball Men and Women competitions added
2007	9	Vienna (Austria)	TU Wien	
2008	10	Budapest, Hungary	BME	Basketball Women competition added
2009	11	Milan, Italy	Università Cattolica del Sacro Cuore	Golf and Pitch & putt competition added
2010	12	Valencia, Spain	Universidad CEU Cardenal Herrera	
2011	13	Amsterdam, the Netherlands	INHolland University of Applied Sciences	Individual golf and individual pitch & putt added
2012	14	Belgrade, Serbia	University of Belgrade	Golf and pitch & putt, individual golf and individual pitch & putt competitions dropped
2013	15	Antwerp, Belgium)	University of Antwerp	

== Games council ==
- President: (Iran) Bahram Ghadimi (Islamic Azad University)
- Secretary General: (Russia) Gabriel Anicet Kotchofa (Gubkin Russian State University of Oil and Gas)
- Treasurer: (Spain) Javier Sanchez Milan (CEU Cardinal Herrera University)

== Committee Panathlon Clubs of Universities Executive Board ==
- President: Peter Verboven (PCU Antwerp, Belgium)
- Secretary General: Ambassador Gabriel A. Kotchofa (PCU Mghakis Moscow, Russia)
- Treasurer: Javier Sanchez (PCU Valencia, Spain)
- Games Council Representative: Bahram Ghadimi (PCU Teheran, I.R. Iran)
- Tournament Council Representative: Daniel Muñoz (PCU Valencia, Spain)
- Panathlon International Representative: Simona Callo (Secretary General Panathlon International, Italy)
