= International Pitch and Putt Association =

One of two global governing bodies for pitch and putt

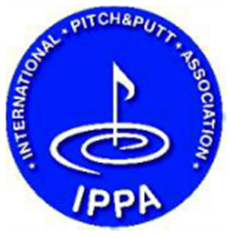
- Sport: Pitch and putt
- Abbreviation: IPPA
- Founded: April 2009
- Headquarters: Madrid, Spain
- President: Carlo Farioli
- Secretary: Nick Fromings

The International Pitch and Putt Association (IPPA) is one of the governing bodies for the sport of pitch and putt in the world, along with the Federation of International Pitch and Putt Associations (FIPPA).

== History ==
IPPA, which was founded on 2 April 2009 in Madrid in Spain, includes several organizations that develop and maintain the sport of pitch and putt at a national and international level. The IPPA is a non profit organization based in Spain.

IPPA aspires to contribute to the global expansion of pitch and putt by establishing a close relationship between pitch and putt, golf and other relevant sports organizations. IPPA defines pitch and putt as golf with a difference and views pitch and putt as a specialty of golf.

IPPA's ambition is to promote the competitive sport of pitch and putt internationally by organizing competitions at the highest level, as well as activities of a cultural nature and promoting the development of youth participation in the sport.

== Members ==
The founding members of IPPA were Association Française de Pitch & Putt (AFPP), Real Federación Española de Golf (RFEG), Federazione Italiana Pitch and Putt (FIP&P), Federação Portuguesa de Golfe (FPG), Federazione Sammarinese Golf (FSG) and Danish Pitch and Putt Union (DPPU). DPPU decided in December 2010 to go independent and therefore resigned as a member.

IPPA Members
| | Member | Web site |
| England | English Pitch and Putt (EPP) | |
| France | Française de Pitch & Putt (FPP) | francepitchandputt.com |
| Italy | Federazione Italiana Pitch and Putt (FIPP) | https://web.archive.org/web/20060517073704/http://www.pitchputt.it/(archived 2006) |
| Austria | Österreichischer Pitch & Putt Verband (ÖPPV) | http://oeppv.at/ (archived 2018) |
| Portugal | Federação Portuguesa de Golfe (FPG) | http://www.fpg.pt/ (archived 2011) |
| San Marino | Federazione Sammarinese Golf (FSG) | https://www.cons.sm/ |
| Switzerland | Association Suisse de Pitch and Putt (ASPP) | http://www.sakegolf.ch/it/ |
| Spain | Real Federación Española de Golf (RFEG) | golfspainfederacion.com/ (archived 2009) |
| IFIUS | International Federation for Interuniversity Sport (IFIUS) | https://www.pcucommittee.com/ |
| Albania | Albanian Golf Federation (AGF) | fshgolf.org/ (archived 2013) |
| India | Indian Pitch and Putt Union (IPPU) | ippu.in/ |
