= 2011 World Interuniversity Games =

The 2011 World Interuniversity Games were the 13th edition of the Games (organised by IFIUS, and were held in Amsterdam, the Netherlands, from October 10 to October 14, 2011.

== Competitions ==
Football Men:
1. University of Applied Sciences Wiener Neustadt (Wiener Neustadt, Austria)
2. Moscow State ESI University (Moscow, Russia)
3. ASE Bucharest (Bucharest, Romania) and University of Vienna (Vienna, Austria)

Football Women : University Abderrahmane Mira de Bejaia (Algeria) (Béjaïa, Algeria)
Futsal Men : Islamic Azad University, Karaj Branch (Karaj, Iran)
Basketball Men : Islamic Azad University, Karaj Branch (Karaj, Iran)
Basketball Women : Università Cattolica del Sacro Cuore (Milan, Rome, Italy)
Volleyball Men : Antwerp University Association (Antwerp, Belgium)
Volleyball Women : University of Bacău (Bacău, Romania)
Golf and Pitch & Putt : Mendeleyev University of Chemical Technology (Moscow, Russia)
Individual golf : Volkov Roman, Mendeleyev University of Chemical Technology (Moscow, Russia)
Individual pitch & putt: Grajdianu Ilia, Mendeleyev University of Chemical Technology (Moscow, Russia)
