= 2005 Pitch and putt European Championship =

IV European Championship · Pitch and putt: The Netherlands 2005 -
Teams	9
Host	(Netherlands) Overbetuwe
Date	August 26 to 28 2005
Podium • Champion • Runner up • Third place • Fourth place	(Republic of Ireland) Ireland; The Netherlands; Catalonia (United Kingdom) Great Britain

The 2005 Pitch and putt European Championship held in Overbetuwe (The Netherlands) was promoted by the European Pitch and Putt Association (EPPA), with 9 teams in competition.

Ireland won their fourth European Pitch and putt Championship.

== Qualifying round ==
36 holes qualifying
1. (Republic of Ireland) Ireland	510
2. Catalonia	540
3. The Netherlands	540
4. (United Kingdom) Great Britain	554
5. France	579
6. Norway	592
7. Italy	596
8. Switzerland	605
9. San Marino	615

== Pools round ==
Pool A	Pts	P	W	D	L	PF	PA
(Republic of Ireland) Ireland	4	2	2	0	0	17,5	0,5
San Marino	2	2	1	0	1	5,5	12,5
Norway	0	2	0	0	2	4	14

Pool A
Pool A	Norway	4-5	San Marino	August 27, 2005

Pool A
Pool A	Ireland	9-0	Norway	August 27, 2005

Pool A
Pool A	Ireland	8,5-0,5	San Marino	August 27, 2005

Pool B	Pts	P	W	D	L	PF	PA
Catalonia	4	2	2	0	0	14,5	3,5
France	2	2	1	0	1	7	11
Switzerland	0	2	0	0	2	5,5	12,5

Pool B
Pool B	Catalonia	6-3	Switzerland	August 27, 2005

Pool B
Pool B	France	6,5-2,5	Switzerland	August 27, 2005

Pool B
Pool B	Catalonia	8,5-0,5	France	August 27, 2005

Pool C	Pts	P	W	D	L	PF	PA
The Netherlands	4	2	2	0	0	16	2
(United Kingdom) Great Britain	2	2	1	0	1	7	11
Italy	0	2	0	0	2	4	14

Pool C
Pool C	The Netherlands	9-0	Italy	August 27, 2005

Pool C
Pool C	Italy	4-5	Great Britain	August 27, 2005

Pool C
Pool C	The Netherlands	7-2	Great Britain	August 27, 2005

== Final round ==
7-9 places	Pts	P	W	D	L	PF	PA
Italy	4	2	2	0	0	13	5
Norway	2	2	1	0	1	8	10
Switzerland	0	2	0	0	2	6	12

7th-9th places
7th-9th places	Italy	6-3	Norway	August 28, 2005

7th-9th places
7th-9th places	Norway	5-4	Switzerland	August 28, 2005

7th-9th places
7th-9th places	Italy	7-2	Switzerland	August 28, 2005

4-6 places	Pts	P	W	D	L	PF	PA
(United Kingdom) Great Britain	4	2	2	0	0	12	2
France	2	2	1	0	1	8	10
San Marino	0	2	0	0	2	3	15

4th-6th places
4th-6th places	San Marino	0-9	Great Britain	August 28, 2005

4th-6th places
4th-6th places	San Marino	3-6	France	August 28, 2005

4th-6th places
4th-6th places	Great Britain	7-2	France	August 28, 2005

Championship	Pts	P	W	D	L	PF	PA
(Republic of Ireland) Ireland	4	2	2	0	0	15	3
The Netherlands	2	2	1	0	1	8	10
Catalonia	0	2	0	0	2	4	14

Championships Pool
Championships Pool	Ireland	8-1	The Netherlands	August 28, 2005

Championships Pool
Championships Pool	The Netherlands	7-2	Catalonia	August 28, 2005

Championships Pool
Championships Pool	Ireland	7-2	Catalonia	August 28, 2005

Champions
IRELAND

== Final standings ==
Final Standings
1	(Republic of Ireland) Ireland
2	The Netherlands
3	Catalonia
4	(United Kingdom) Great Britain
5	France
6	San Marino
7	Italy
8	Norway
9	Switzerland
