= 2010 World Interuniversity Games =

XII World Interuniversity Games Valencia 2010
- Host city: Valencia, Spain
- Nations: 104
- Athletes: 4,090
- Events: 33
- Opening: October 4, 2010
- Closing: October 12, 2010
- Opened by: King Juan Carlos I
- Main venue: Mestalla Stadium

The 2010 World Interuniversity Games were the 12th edition of the Games (organised by IFIUS, and took place in Valencia, Spain.

== Venues ==
- Mestalla Stadium - Opening and closing ceremonies, athletics, football

== Hosting ==
After 8 years, the Games were again held in Spain. The Universidad CEU Cardenal Herrera were the host university.
