= FIPPA =

FIPPA is an acronym which may refer to:

- Federation of International Pitch and Putt Associations, the first-established of the two global governing bodies of pitch and putt
- Freedom of Information and Protection of Privacy Act, Canadian provincial legislation
- Foreign investment promotion and protection agreement, any of numerous investment agreements between Canada and other countries
