= 1999 World Interuniversity Games =

I World Interuniversity Games Antwerp 1999
- Host city: Antwerp, Belgium
- Nations: 12
- Athletes: 2,400
- Events: 12
- Opening: April 14, 1999
- Closing: April 20, 1999
- Opened by: Albert II
- Main venue: Olympisch Stadion

The 1999 World Interuniversity Games were the first edition of the Games (organised by IFIUS), and were held in Antwerp, Belgium.
