= 2001 World Interuniversity Games =

International sports event

III World Interuniversity Games Paris 2001
- Host city: Paris, France
- Nations: 104
- Athletes: 4,090
- Events: 33
- Opening: October 4, 2001
- Closing: October 20, 2001
- Opened by: Jacques Chirac
- Torch lighter: John Rembroc
- Main venue: Parc des Princes

The 2001 World Interuniversity Games were the third edition of the Games (organised by IFIUS), and were held in Paris, France.
