= Catalonia men's national pitch and putt team =

Catalonia
- Association: Federació Catalana de Pitch and Putt
- Confederation: FIPPA, EPPA.
- Head coach: Xavier Ponsdomènech

World Cup
- Appearances: 3 (First in 2004)
- Best result: Champions (2004, 2006)

6
- Appearances: 6 (First in 1999)
- Best result: 6

The Catalonia men's national pitch and putt team represents Catalonia in the pitch and putt international competitions. It is managed by the Catalan Federation of Pitch and putt (FCPP).

Pitch and putt is played in Catalonia since the "eighties" when Martin Withelaw build a course in Solius (Girona). The interest on Pitch and putt has been growing since then, with more than 10000 players in 2004.

In 1999 the "Associació Catalana de Pitch and putt" was one of the founders of the European Pitch and Putt Association, the governing body that develops the pitch and putt in Europe and stages the European Team Championship. Catalonia has won once the European Championship (2010).

In 2006 the "Federació Catalana de Pitch and putt" participated in the establishment of the Federation International of Pitch and Putt Associations (FIPPA), that stages the World Cup Team Championship. Catalonia has won 2 World Cups, in 2004 and 2006.

== National team ==
World Cup
Year	Championship	Host	Classification
2004	1st World Cup	Chia (Italy)	Champions
2006	2nd World Cup	Teià (Catalonia)	Champions
2008	3rd World Cup	Papendal (Netherlands)	3rd place

European Championships
Year	Championship	Host	Classification
1999	1st European Championship	Chelmsford (Great Britain)	4th place
2001	2nd European Championship	Lloret de Mar (Catalonia)	2nd place
2003	3rd European Championship	McDonagh (Ireland)	2nd place
2005	4th European Championship	Overbetuwe (The Netherlands)	3rd place
2007	5th European Championship	Chia (Italy)	2nd place
2010	6th European Championship	Lloret de Mar (Catalonia)	Champions

== Players ==
Team in the European Championship 2010

- Enric Sanz
- Paco Salido
- Fernando Cano
- Jordi Saborit
- Dani Gimenez
- Daniel Coleman

Team in the World Cup 2008

- Fernando Cano
- Salvador Garangou
- Daniel Giménez

Team in the European Championship 2007

- Marc Lloret
- Joan Poch
- Fernando Cano
- Jordi Serra
- David Solé
- Daniel Coleman

== See also ==
- World Cup Team Championship
- European Team Championship
