= 2004 Pitch and Putt World Cup =

I World Cup · Pitch and putt: Italy 2004 -
Teams	8
Host	(Italy) Chia
Date	October 8 to 10 2004
Podium • Champion • Runner up • Third place • Fourth place	Catalonia; Netherlands; France; Norway

The 2004 Pitch and Putt World Cup, the inaugural edition of the competition promoted by the Federation of International Pitch and Putt Associations (FIPPA), was held in Chia, Italy, with 8 national teams competing. Catalonia won this World Cup.

== Qualifying round ==
36 holes qualification
1.	France	263
2.	Catalonia	270
3.	Norway	279
4.	(United Kingdom) Great Britain	280
5.	The Netherlands	287
6.	San Marino	288
7.	Italy	289
8.	Switzerland	310
* 5 best results

== Final rounds ==
Quarter finals
1	France	4
8	Switzerland	1
4	(United Kingdom) Great Britain	0,5
5	The Netherlands	4,5
3	Norway	4
6	San Marino	1
7	Italy	0
2	Catalonia	5

Semifinals
1	France	2,5
5	The Netherlands	2,5
3	Norway	1,5
2	Catalonia	3,5

Final
1	The Netherlands	2
2	(Catalonia) CATALONIA	3

Quarterfinals
Quarterfinals	France	4-1	Switzerland	October 9, 2004

Quarterfinals
Quarterfinals	The Netherlands	4,5-0,5	Great Britain	October 9, 2004

Quarterfinals
Quarterfinals	Norway	4-1	San Marino	October 9, 2004

Quarterfinals
Quarterfinals	Catalonia	5-0	Italy	October 9, 2004

5-8 places
5-8 places	Great Britain	3-2	Switzerland	October 9, 2004

5-8 places
5-8 places	Italy	3,5-1,5	San Marino	October 9, 2004

Semifinals
Semifinals	Catalonia	3,5-1,5	Norway	October 9, 2004

Semifinals
Semifinals	The Netherlands	2,5-2,5	France	October 9, 2004

7th-8th places
7th-8th places	Switzerland	4-1	San Marino	October 10, 2004

5th-6th places
5th-6th places	Great Britain	3-2	Italy	October 10, 2004

3rd-4th places
3rd-4th places	France	2,5-2,5	Norway	October 10, 2004

FINAL
FINAL	Catalonia	3-2	The Netherlands	October 10, 2004

Champions
CATALONIA

== Final standings ==
Team
1	Catalonia
2	The Netherlands
3	France
4	Norway
5	(United Kingdom) Great Britain
6	Italy
7	Switzerland
8	San Marino

== See also ==
- Pitch and Putt World Cup
