= 1999 Pitch and putt European Championship =

I European Championship · Pitch and putt: Great Britain 1999 -
Teams	6
Host	(United Kingdom) Chelmsford
Date	11 to 12 June 1999
Podium • Champion • Runner up • Third place • Fourth place	(Republic of Ireland) Ireland (United Kingdom) Great Britain; Italy; Catalonia

The 1999 Pitch and putt European Championship held in Chelmsford (Great Britain) was the first edition for the European Pitch and putt Championship promoted by the European Pitch and Putt Association (EPPA), with 6 teams in competition. Ireland won the championship.

== First round ==
POOL A	Pts	P	W	D	L	PF	PA
(Republic of Ireland) Ireland	4	2	2	0	0	9	1
Catalonia	2	2	1	0	1	6	4
France	0	2	0	0	2	0	10

Pool A
Pool A	Ireland	4–1	Catalonia	11 June 1999

Pool A
Pool A	Ireland	5–0	France	11 June 1999

Pool A
Pool A	Catalonia	5–0	France	11 June 1999

POOL B	Pts	P	W	D	L	PF	PA
(United Kingdom) Great Britain	4	2	2	0	0	8	2
Italy	2	2	1	0	1	6	4
The Netherlands	0	2	0	0	2	1	9

Pool B
Pool B	Great Britain	3–2	Italy	11 June 1999

Pool B
Pool B	Great Britain	5–0	The Netherlands	11 June 1999

Pool B
Pool B	Italy	4–1	The Netherlands	11 June 1999

== Final round ==
Semi-finals
1	(Republic of Ireland) Ireland	6
4	Italy	1
3	Catalonia	2
2	(United Kingdom) Great Britain	5

Final
(Republic of Ireland) IRELAND	6
(United Kingdom) Great Britain	1

Semi-finals
Semi-finals	Ireland	6–1	Italy	12 June 1999

Semi-finals
Semi-finals	Great Britain	5–2	Catalonia	12 June 1999

5th–6th places
5th–6th places	France	5–2	The Netherlands	12 June 1999

3rd–4th places
3rd–4th places	Italy	5–2	Catalonia	12 June 1999

FINAL
FINAL	Ireland	6–1	Great Britain	12 June 1999

Champions
IRELAND

== Final standings ==
Final Standings
1	(Republic of Ireland) Ireland
2	(United Kingdom) Great Britain
3	Italy
4	Catalonia
5	France
6	The Netherlands
