= 2004 World Interuniversity Games =

The 2004 World Interuniversity Games were the sixth edition of the Games (organised by IFIUS), and were held in Antwerp, Belgium.
