= European Pitch and putt Strokeplay Championship =

European Pitch and putt Strokeplay Championship is the singles European competition organized by the European Pitch and Putt Association (EPPA) since 2011.

== 2011 European Strokeplay Championship ==
The first championship was played on 15–17 July 2011, at Imjelt course, in Drammen (Norway), and crowned Irish player Ian Farrelly as European Champion.

2011 European Strokeplay Championship
		R1	R2	R3	TOT
Gold	(Republic of Ireland) Ian Farrelly	49	47	49	145
Silver	(Republic of Ireland) John Crangle	49	51	46	146
Bronze	(Republic of Ireland) John Walsh	47	51	48	146
4.	(Netherlands) Rolf Kwant	52	49	48	149
5.	(Republic of Ireland) Frank Dineen	54	47	50	151
6.	(Norway) Frank Kristiansen	53	49	52	154
7.	(Netherlands) Henk-Rik Koetsier	54	52	49	155
8.	(Catalonia) Jordi Serra	51	53	51	155
9.	(Republic of Ireland) Alan Hanlon	51	53	52	156
10.	(Republic of Ireland) William Buckley	55	53	49	157
