= 2006 Pitch and Putt World Cup =

II World Cup · Pitch and putt: Catalonia 2006 -
Teams	13
Host	(Catalonia) Teià
Date	March 23 to 25 2006
Podium; Champion; Runner up Third place Fourth place	Catalonia; Andorra; Ireland; Netherlands

The 2006 Pitch and Putt World Cup, the second edition of the championship promoted by the Federation of International Pitch and Putt Associations (FIPPA), was held in Teià (Catalonia), with 13 teams competing. Hosts and defending champions Catalonia won the World Cup again.

== Qualifying round ==
36 holes qualification
1.	Catalonia	255
2.	Ireland	263
3.	Andorra	277
4.	Netherlands	281
5.	France	282
6.	Norway	285
7.	Great Britain	289
8.	Chile	294
9.	San Marino	299
10.	Italy	299
11.	Switzerland	307
12.	Denmark	332
13.	Australia	357
* 5 best results

== League 9th-13th places ==
9-13 places	Pts	P	W	D	L	PF	PA
Switzerland	6	4	3	0	1	10	2
Italy	6	4	3	0	1	8,5	3,5
San Marino	6	4	3	0	1	7	5
Denmark	2	4	1	0	3	4	8
Australia	0	4	0	0	4	0,5	11,5

San Marino	3-0	Australia

Italy	0-3	Switzerland

San Marino	2-1	Denmark

Switzerland	3-0	Australia

Italy	2,5-0,5	Australia

Switzerland	3-0	Denmark

Italy	3-0	San Marino

Australia	0-3	Denmark

San Marino	2-1	Switzerland

Italy	3-0	Denmark

== Final Rounds ==
Quarter finals
1	Catalonia	4
8	Chile	1
5	France	1,5
4	Netherlands	3,5
3	Andorra	3
6	Norway	2
7	Great Britain	2
2	Ireland	3

Semifinals
1	Catalonia	4
4	Netherlands	1
3	Andorra	3
2	Ireland	2

Final
1	Catalonia	3,5
3	Andorra	1,5

Quarterfinals
Quarterfinals	Catalonia	4-1	Chile	March 24, 2006

Quarterfinals
Quarterfinals	Netherlands	3,5-1,5	France	March 24, 2006

Quarterfinals
Quarterfinals	Andorra	3-2	Norway	March 24, 2006

Quarterfinals
Quarterfinals	Ireland	3-2	Great Britain	March 24, 2006

5-8 places
5-8 places	France	4,5-0,5	Chile	March 24, 2006

5-8 places
5-8 places	Norway	3-2	Great Britain	March 24, 2006

Semifinals
Semifinals	Catalonia	4-1	Netherlands	March 24, 2006

Semifinals
Semifinals	Ireland	2-3	Andorra	March 24, 2006

7th-8th places
7th-8th places	Great Britain	5-0	Chile	March 25, 2006

5th-6th places
5th-6th places	France	2-3	Norway	March 25, 2006

3rd-4th places
3rd-4th places	Ireland	4-1	Netherlands	March 25, 2006

FINAL
FINAL	Catalonia	3,5-1,5	Andorra	March 25, 2006

Champions
CATALONIA

== Final standings ==
Team
1	Catalonia
2	Andorra
3	Ireland
4	Netherlands
5	Norway
6	France
7	Great Britain
8	Chile
9	Switzerland
10	Italy
11	San Marino
12	Denmark
13	Australia

== See also ==
- Pitch and Putt World Cup
