= 2001 Pitch and putt European Championship =

II European Championship · Pitch and putt: Catalonia 2001 -
Teams	6
Host	(Catalonia) Lloret de Mar
Date	May 3 to 5 2001
Podium; Champion; Runner up Third place Fourth place	Ireland; Catalonia; Italy; France

The 2001 Pitch and putt European Championship held in Lloret de Mar (Catalonia) was promoted by the European Pitch and Putt Association (EPPA), with 6 teams in competition. Ireland won their second European Pitch and putt Championship.

== Qualifying round ==
36 holes qualifying
Ireland	504
Catalonia	513
Netherlands	584
Great Britain	601
Italy	604
France	606

== Pools round ==
POOL A	Pts	P	W	D	L	PF	PA
Ireland	4	2	2	0	0	10,5	1,5
France	2	2	1	0	1	5	7
Great Britain	0	2	0	0	2	2,5	9,5

Pool A
Pool A	Ireland	5-1	France	May 4, 2001

Pool A
Pool A	France	4-2	Great Britain	May 4, 2001

Pool A
Pool A	Ireland	5,5-0,5	Great Britain	May 4, 2001

POOL B	Pts	P	W	D	L	PF	PA
Catalonia	4	2	2	0	0	12	0
Italy	2	2	1	0	1	3,5	8,5
Netherlands	0	2	0	0	2	2,5	9,5

Pool B
Pool B	Catalonia	6-0	Italy	May 4, 2001

Pool B
Pool B	Italy	3,5-2,5	Netherlands	May 4, 2001

Pool B
Pool B	Catalonia	6-0	Netherlands	May 4, 2001

== Final round ==
5th-6th places
5th-6th places	Netherlands	5,5-3,5	Great Britain	May 5, 2001

3rd-4th places
3rd-4th places	Italy	6,5-2,5	France	May 5, 2001

FINAL
FINAL	Ireland	6-3	Catalonia	May 5, 2001

Champions
IRELAND

== Final standings ==
Team
1	Ireland
2	Catalonia
3	Italy
4	France
5	Netherlands
6	Great Britain
