= 2010 Pitch and putt European Championship =

Pitch and putt championship held in Catalonia

VI European P&P Championship: Catalonia 2007 -
Teams	8
Host	(Catalonia) Lloret de Mar
Date	September 24 to 26
Podium; Champion; Runner up Third place Fourth place	Catalonia; Ireland; Netherlands; Great Britain

The 2010 Pitch and putt European Teams Championship held in Lloret de Mar (Catalonia) was organized by the Federació Catalana de Pitch and Putt and promoted by the European Pitch and Putt Association (EPPA), with 8 teams in competition. Catalonia won their first European title.

== Teams ==
(Republic of Ireland) Ireland
Ray Murphy
John Walsh
William Sheridan
Chris Scannell
Kieron Dunscombe
Eddie Carey

Catalonia
Enric Sanz
Paco Salido
Fernando Cano
Jordi Saborit
Dani Gimenez
Daniel Coleman

The Netherlands
Rolf Kwant
Henk Rik Koetsier
Patrick Luning
Marcel Ahuis
Rinus Huberts
L. Swennenhuis

Andorra
Pepe Garcia
Guillem Escabrós
Pau Perez
Ivan Sanz
Toni Armengol
Joan Carles Busquet

(United Kingdom) Great Britain
Steve Deeble
John Deeble
Savio Fernandes
Jamie Deeble
Neil Green
Ron Cope

Norway
Bernt K. Nerland
Anders C. Juel
Jan Vingen
Knut Henrik Lie
Kenneth Vika
Anders Olsen

Switzerland
Claudio Spescha
Ueli Lamm
Silvano Umberg
Helmut Roth
Edy Planzer
Hansheiri Legler

Germany
Manfred Kolvenbach
Harald Brinkmeyer
Carl M. Gehrmann
P. von Witzendorff
Sven Göth
Max Hergt

== Qualifying round ==
36 holes qualifying
1.	Ireland	510
2.	Catalonia	529
3.	Netherlands	534
4.	Andorra	556
5.	Great Britain	564
6.	Norway	573
7.	Switzerland	609
8.	Germany	706
* 5 best results

== Final Rounds ==
Quarter finals
1	Ireland	9
8	Germany	0
5	Great Britain	4.5*
4	Andorra	4.5
3	Netherlands	7
6	Norway	2
7	Switzerland	2
2	Catalonia	7

Semifinals
1	Ireland	8
5	Great Britain	1
3	Netherlands	1
2	Catalonia	8

Final
1	Ireland	4
2	Catalonia	5

Quarterfinals
Quarterfinals	Ireland	9-0	Germany	September 24–25

Quarterfinals
Quarterfinals	Catalonia	7-2	Switzerland	September 24–25

Quarterfinals
Quarterfinals	Netherlands	7-2	Norway	September 24–25

Quarterfinals
Quarterfinals	Andorra	4.5-4.5*	Great Britain	September 24–25

5-8 places
5-8 places	Switzerland	3-6	Norway	September 25

5-8 places
5-8 places	Andorra	9-0	Germany	September 25

Semifinals
Semifinals	Ireland	8-1	Great Britain	September 25

Semifinals
Semifinals	Catalonia	8-1	Netherlands	September 25

7th-8th places
7th-8th places	Switzerland	8.5-0.5	Germany	September 26

5th-6th places
5th-6th places	Andorra	5.5-3.5	Norway	September 26

3rd-4th places
3rd-4th places	Netherlands	5.5-3.5	Great Britain	September 26

FINAL
FINAL	Ireland	4-5	Catalonia	September 26

Champions
CATALONIA

== Final standings ==
Final Standings
1	Catalonia
2	Ireland
3	Netherlands
4	Great Britain
5	Andorra
6	Norway
7	Switzerland
8	Germany

== See also ==
- European Pitch and putt Championship
