= Netherlands men's national pitch and putt team =

Sports team

The Netherlands
- Association: Netherlands Federation of Pitch and putt
- Confederation: FIPPA, EPPA.
- Head coach: Rinus Huberts / Meinard Lutterop

World Cup
- Appearances: 3 (First in 2004)
- Best result: Runners-up (2004, 2008)

6
- Appearances: 6 (First in 1999)
- Best result: 6

The Netherlands men's national pitch and putt team represents the Netherlands in the pitch and putt international competitions. It is managed by the Netherlands Federation of Pitch and putt (PPBN).

In 1999 it was one of the founders of the European Pitch and Putt Association, the governing body that develops the pitch and putt in Europe and stages the European Team Championship, where the Netherlands reached the second place in 2005. In 2006 participated in the creation of the Federation of International Pitch and Putt Associations (FIPPA), that stages the World Cup Team Championship. The Netherlands obtained the second place in 2004 and 2008.

== National team ==
World Cup
| Year | Championship | Host | Classification |
| 2004 | 1st World Cup | Chia (Italy) | 2nd place |
| 2006 | 2nd World Cup | Teià (Catalonia) | 4th place |
| 2008 | 3rd World Cup | Papendal (Netherlands) | 2nd place |

European Championships
| Year | Championship | Host | Classification |
| 1999 | 1st European Championship | Chelmsford (Great Britain) | 6th place |
| 2001 | 2nd European Championship | Lloret de Mar (Catalonia) | 5th place |
| 2003 | 3rd European Championship | McDonagh (Ireland) | 4th place |
| 2005 | 4th European Championship | Overbetuwe (Netherlands) | 2nd place |
| 2007 | 5th European Championship | Chia (Italy) | 4th place |
| 2010 | 6th European Championship | Lloret de Mar (Catalonia) | 3rd place |

== Players ==
National team in the European Championship 2010

- Rolf Kwant
- Henk Rik Koetsier
- Patrick Luning
- Marcel Ahuis
- Rinus Huberts
- Lennart Swennenhuis

National team in the World Cup 2008

- Patrick Luning
- Jan Tijhuis
- Rolf Kwant

National team in the European Championship 2007

- Rolf Kwant
- Patrick Lunning
- Karl Bergh
- Lennart Swennenhuis
- Jan Tijhuis
- Henk-Rik Koetsier

== See also ==
- World Cup Team Championship
- European Team Championship
