= 2008 Pitch and Putt World Cup =

III World Cup · Pitch and putt: The Netherlands 2008 -
Teams	14
Host	(Netherlands) Arnhem
Date	October 16 to 18
Podium
Champions; Second place Third place Fourth place	(Republic of Ireland) Ireland; Netherlands; Catalonia (United Kingdom) Great Britain

The 2008 Pitch and putt World Cup was held on the Papendal course, close to Arnhem (Netherlands) and was the third edition for this championship promoted by the Federation of International Pitch and Putt Associations (FIPPA), with 14 national teams. Ireland won the World Cup after defeating The Netherlands in the final.

== Teams ==
(Republic of Ireland) Ireland
Paul O'Brien
Raymond Murphy
Derek Courtney
Breda Brophy (cp)

The Netherlands
Patrick Luning
Jan Tijhuis
Rolf Kwant
R.Huberts /M.Lutterop

Catalonia
Salvador Garangou
Daniel Giménez
Fernando Cano
Xavier Ponsdomènech

(United Kingdom) Great Britain
Steve Deeble
John Deeble
Anthony O'Brien
Rone Cope (cp)

Andorra
Toni Armengol
Guillem Escabrós
Josep Escabrós
Francesc Gaset (cp)

Australia
James Rogerson
Stewart Genge
Marie Hutchison
Charlie Hutchison (cp)

France
Jean-Claude Richard
Bernard Dinnat
Christian Auziere
Pierre Rongier (cp)

Chile
Fernando Valenzuela
Daniel Valenzuela
Guillermo Aranciba
Juan Moran (cp)

Norway
Anders Olsen
Toni Ede
Jan Andersen
Jo G Brand (cp)

Italy
Enrico Ciuffarella
Angelo Fusco
Vanni Rastrelli
Fabrizio Frassoldati

Switzerland
Claudio Spescha
Marco Bernardini
Oliver Schumacher
Oliver Schumacher

San Marino
Marco Galassi
Loris Riccardi
Roberto Bianchi
Giulio Caramaschi (cp)

Germany
Heiko Tigges
Ralf Kerkeling
Silvio Dietz
Silvio Dietz (cp)

Belgium
Antoine Ferdin
Jonathan Debacker
Jean-François Cornez
Matthieu Donadieu (cp)

== Qualifying round ==
36 holes qualification
1.	(Republic of Ireland) Ireland	243
2.	The Netherlands	247
3.	Catalonia	252
4.	(United Kingdom) Great Britain	253
5.	Andorra	257
6.	Australia	266
7.	France	267
8.	Chile	273
9.	Norway	288
10.	Italy	288
11.	Switzerland	289
12.	San Marino	293
11.	Germany	307
12.	Belgium	322
* 5 best results

== Second round ==
Places 9-14

GROUP A	Pts	P	W	D	L	PF	PA	DP
San Marino	3	2	1	1	0	7,5	2,5	+5
Norway	3	2	1	1	0	6,5	3,5	+3
Belgium	0	2	0	0	2	1	9	-8

October 16 and 17
October 16 and 17	Norway	4-1	Belgium	Papendal Course

October 17
October 17	San Marino	5-0	Belgium	Papendal Course

October 17
October 17	Norway	2,5-2,5	San Marino	Papendal Course

GROUP B	Pts	P	W	D	L	PF	PA	DP
Switzerland	3	2	1	1	0	5,5	4,5	+1
Italy	2	2	1	0	1	5,5	4,5	+1
Germany	1	2	0	1	1	4	6	-2

October 16 and 17
October 16 and 17	Italy	3,5-1,5	Germany	Papendal Course

October 17
October 17	Switzerland	2,5-2,5	Germany	Papendal Course

October 17
October 17	Italy	2-3	Switzerland	Papendal Course

== Final rounds ==
Quarter finals
1	(Republic of Ireland) Ireland	5
8	Chile	0
5	Andorra	0,5
4	(United Kingdom) Great Britain	4,5
3	Catalonia	3
6	Australia	2
7	France	1
2	The Netherlands	4

Semifinals
1	(Republic of Ireland) Ireland	3,5
4	(United Kingdom) Great Britain	1,5
3	Catalonia	0,5
2	The Netherlands	4,5

Final
1	(Republic of Ireland) Ireland	4
2	The Netherlands	1

Quarter finals

October 16 and 17
October 16 and 17	Ireland (Republic of Ireland)	5-0	Chile	Papendal Course

October 16 and 17
October 16 and 17	Great Britain (United Kingdom)	4,5-0,5	Andorra	Papendal Course

October 16 and 17
October 16 and 17	Catalonia	3-2	Australia	Papendal Course

October 16 and 17
October 16 and 17	The Netherlands	4-1	France	Papendal Course

Places 5-8

October 17
October 17	Chile	3-2	Andorra	Papendal Course

October 16 and 17
October 16 and 17	Australia	1,5-3,5	France	Papendal Course

Semifinals

October 17
October 17	Ireland (Republic of Ireland)	3,5-1,5	(United Kingdom) Great Britain	Papendal Course

October 16 and 17
October 16 and 17	The Netherlands	4,5-0,5	Catalonia	Papendal Course

Places 13-14

October 18
October 18	Belgium	2-3	Germany	Papendal Course

Places 11-12

October 18
October 18	Norway	3,5-1,5	Italy	Papendal Course

Places 9-10

October 18
October 18	San Marino	4-1	Switzerland	Papendal Course

Places 7-8

October 18
October 18	Australia	2-3	Andorra	Papendal Course

Places 5-6

October 18
October 18	France	2-3	Chile	Papendal Course

Places 3-4

October 18
October 18	Catalonia	3,5-1,5	(United Kingdom) Great Britain	Papendal Course

FINAL

October 18
October 18	Ireland (Republic of Ireland)	4-1	The Netherlands	Papendal Course

Champions
Ireland

== Final standings ==
Final standings
1	(Republic of Ireland) Ireland
2	The Netherlands
3	Catalonia
4	(United Kingdom) Great Britain
5	Chile
6	France
7	Andorra
8	Australia
9	San Marino
10	Switzerland
11	Norway
12	Italy
13	Germany
14	Belgium

== See also ==
- Pitch and Putt World Cup
