= Andorra men's national pitch and putt team =

Andorra
- Association: Associació Andorrana de Pitch and Putt
- Confederation: FIPPA, EPPA.
- Head coach: Francesc Gaset

World Cup
- Appearances: 2 (First in 2006)
- Best result: Runners-up (2006)

2
- Appearances: 2 (First in 2007)
- Best result: 2

Andorra men's national pitch and putt team represents Andorra in the pitch and putt international competitions. It is managed by the Associació Andorrana de Pitch and Putt, established in 2007.

Pitch and putt in Andorra is played in two courses, "El Torrent" and "Vall d'Ordino".

Andorra were the runners-up in the 2006 Pitch and putt World Cup, and reached the fifth place in the 2007 and 2010 European Championships.

== National team ==
World Cup
Year	Championship	Host	Classification
2006	2nd World Cup	Teià (Catalonia)	2nd place
2008	3rd World Cup	Papendal (Netherlands)	7th place

European Championships
Year	Championship	Host	Classification
2007	5th European Championship	Chia (Italy)	5th place
2010	6th European Championship	Lloret de Mar (Catalonia)	5th place

== Players ==
National team in the European Championship 2010

- Pepe Garcia
- Guillem Escabrós
- Pau Perez
- Ivan Sanz
- Toni Armengol
- Joan Carles Busquet

National team in the World Cup 2008

- Antoni Armengol
- Guillem Escabrós
- Josep Escabrós

National team in the European Championship 2007

- Antoni Armengol
- Marc Armengol
- Guillem Escabrós
- Ivan Sanz
- Ferran da Silca
- Francesc Gaset

== See also ==
- World Cup Team Championship
