= Australia men's national pitch and putt team =

Australia
- Association: Australian Pitch and Putt Association
- Confederation: FIPPA
- Head coach: Charlie Hutchison

World Cup
- Appearances: 2 (First in 2006)
- Best result: (gold) Champions, 2024
- Appearances: (First in )

The Australia men's national pitch and putt team represents Australia in the pitch and putt international competitions. It is managed by the Australian Pitch and Putt Association (APPA).

Australian Pitch and Putt Association is one of the founders of the Federation of International Pitch and Putt Associations (FIPPA).

Australia reached the 8th place in the 2008 Pitch and putt World Cup.

Stewart Genge fell victim to Harry Karabalis trying to defend his Australian title. Karabalis hit an immaculate 6-under with Genge finishing 4 under.

== National team ==
World Cup
Year	Championship	Host	Classification
2006	2nd World Cup	Teià (Catalonia)	13th place
2008	3rd World Cup	Papendal (Netherlands)	8th place

== Players ==
National team in the World Cup 2009

- Joshua May
- Paul Johnston
- Rebecca Ferrington

National team in the World Cup 2008

- James Rogerson
- Stewart Genge
- Marie Hutchison

National team in the World Cup 2006

- Eero Tarik
- Brian Kirkby
- Annegret Green

== See also ==
- World Cup Team Championship
