= 2003 Pitch and putt European Championship =

III European Championship · Pitch and putt: Ireland 2003 -
| Teams | 8 |
| Host | (Republic of Ireland) McDonagh |
| Date | September 11 to 14 2003 |
| Podium • Champion • Runner up • Third place • Fourth place | (Republic of Ireland) Ireland; Catalonia; France; The Netherlands |

The 2003 Pitch and putt European Championship held in McDonagh (Ireland) was promoted by the European Pitch and Putt Association (EPPA), with 8 national teams in competition.

Ireland won their third European Pitch and putt Championship.

== Qualifying round ==
36 holes qualifying
| 1. | (Republic of Ireland) Ireland | 495 |
| 2. | Catalonia | 533 |
| 3. | The Netherlands | 539 |
| 4. | Italy | 566 |
| 5. | France | 578 |
| 6. | (United Kingdom) Great Britain | 579 |
| 7. | San Marino | 618 |
| 8. | Norway | 649 |

== Final round ==
Quarter finals
1 | (Republic of Ireland) Ireland | 9
8 | Norway | 0
5 | France | 6,5
4 | Italy | 2,5
3 | The Netherlands | 6,5
6 | (United Kingdom) Great Britain | 2,5
7 | San Marino | 0,5
2 | Catalonia | 8,5

Semifinals
1 | (Republic of Ireland) Ireland | 9
5 | France | 0
3 | The Netherlands | 2
2 | Catalonia | 7

Final
1 | (Republic of Ireland) IRELAND | 5,5
2 | Catalonia | 3,5

Quarterfinals
| Quarterfinals | Ireland | 9-0 | Norway | September 12, 2003 |

Quarterfinals
| Quarterfinals | Italy | 2,5-6,5 | France | September 12, 2003 |

Quarterfinals
| Quarterfinals | The Netherlands | 6,5-2,5 | Great Britain | September 12, 2003 |

Quarterfinals
| Quarterfinals | Catalonia | 8,5-0,5 | San Marino | September 12, 2003 |

5-8 places
| 5-8 places | Italy | 7-2 | Norway | September 13, 2003 |

5-8 places
| 5-8 places | Great Britain | 8-1 | San Marino | September 13, 2003 |

Semifinals
| Semifinals | Ireland | 9-0 | France | September 13, 2003 |

Semifinals
| Semifinals | Catalonia | 7-2 | The Netherlands | September 13, 2003 |

7th-8th places
| 7th-8th places | San Marino | 4-5 | Norway | September 14, 2003 |

5th-6th places
| 5th-6th places | Italy | 6-3 | Great Britain | September 14, 2003 |

3rd-4th places
| 3rd-4th places | The Netherlands | 3-6 | France | September 14, 2003 |

FINAL
| FINAL | Ireland | 5,5-3,5 | Catalonia | September 14, 2003 |

Champions
IRELAND

== Final standings ==
Final Standings
| 1 | (Republic of Ireland) Ireland |
| 2 | Catalonia |
| 3 | France |
| 4 | The Netherlands |
| 5 | Italy |
| 6 | (United Kingdom) Great Britain |
| 7 | Norway |
| 8 | San Marino |
