= 2002 World Interuniversity Games =

The 2002 World Interuniversity Games were the fourth edition of the Games (organised by IFIUS), and were held in Barcelona, Spain.
