= Pitch and putt World Strokeplay Championship =

Pitch and putt World Strokeplay Championship is the single world competition organized by the Federation of International Pitch and Putt Associations (FIPPA) played biannually.

== World Strokeplay Championship 2009 ==
The first championship was played in April, 2009, at La Grande Motte course, in France, and crowned Catalan player Fernando Cano as World Champion.

World Strokeplay Championship 2009
		R1	R2	R3	TOT
Gold	(Catalonia) Fernando Cano	50	48	48	146
Silver	(Republic of Ireland) Ray Murphy	45	57	46	148
Bronze	(Republic of Ireland) John Walsh	50	52	48	150
4.	(Catalonia) Marc Lloret	50	56	45	151
5.	(Netherlands) Patrick Luning	50	50	51	151
6.	(Republic of Ireland) Sean Downes	54	49	50	153
7.	(United Kingdom) Steve Deeble	52	52	50	154
8.	(Netherlands) Henk-Rik Koetsier	49	50	55	154
9.	(Republic of Ireland) Derek Courtney	55	53	47	155
10.	(Republic of Ireland) Damien Fleming	54	51	50	155

== World Strokeplay Championship 2013 ==
The first championship was played in July, 2013, at Tambre course, and crowned Irish player John Walsh as World Champion.

World Strokeplay Championship 2013
		R1	R2	R3	R4	TOT
Gold	(Republic of Ireland) John Walsh	53	46	51	48	198
Silver	(Australia) James Rogerson	50	50	49	51	200
Bronze	(United Kingdom) John Deeble	48	50	51	52	201
4.	(Catalonia) Josep Martinez	56	44	51	51	202
5.	(Galicia (Spain)) Sebastián Franco	48	51	53	51	203
	(Republic of Ireland) John Crangle	51	47	51	54	203
	(Republic of Ireland) Frank Dineen	48	49	52	54	203
	(Republic of Ireland) Liam O'Donovan	51	44	51	57	203
9.	(Republic of Ireland) Chrissie Byrne	52	50	50	53	205
10.	(Netherlands) Rolf Kwant	56	51	49	50	206

== See also ==
- Pitch and Putt World Cup
