= Federation of International Pitch and Putt Associations =

Global governing body for pitch and putt

The Federation of International Pitch and Putt Associations (FIPPA) (International Pitch and Putt Federation and European Pitch and Putt Federation) is one of the governing bodies for the pitch and putt in the world, along with the International Pitch and Putt Association (IPPA). It was created in March 2006 by the representatives of 17 national governing bodies and is based in Barcelona, Catalonia.

Members include the pitch and putt unions of Ireland, Great Britain, Catalonia, the Netherlands, Norway, Switzerland, Australia, Chile, Andorra, Germany and the United States. Canada and China are associated members.

== Events ==
FIPPA organizes a World Cup since 2004 and a World Strokeplay Championship since 2009.

== FIPPA Members ==
FIPPA Members
| | Member | Web site |
| Andorra | Associació Andorrana de Pitch and Putt (AAPP) | |
| Australia | Australian Pitch and Putt Association (APPA) | http://www.australianpitchandputt.com/ |
| Canada | Canadian Pitch and Putt Association (CPPA) | https://web.archive.org/web/20110128213146/http://www.canadappa.ca/ |
| Catalonia | Associació Catalana de Pitch and putt (FCPP) | https://web.archive.org/web/20151011050034/http://pitchandputt.cat/ |
| Chile | Federación Chilena de Pitch and Putt (FCPP) | |
| China | China Pitch and Putt Association | |
| Germany | Deutscher Pitch & Putt Verband (DPPV) | http://www.dppv.de/ |
| (United Kingdom) Great Britain | British Pitch and Putt Association (BPPA) | http://www.bppa.org.uk/ |
| (Republic of Ireland) Ireland | Pitch and Putt Union of Ireland (PPUI) | http://www.ppui.ie/ |
| The Netherlands | Nederlandse Pitch&Putt Bond (NPPB) | http://www.nppb.nl |
| Norway | Norges Pitch & Putt Forbund (NPPF) | http://www.pitch-putt.no/ |
| Switzerland | Schweizerischen Pitch and Putt Verband (SPPF) | http://www.sppf.ch/ |
| United States | US Pitch and Putt Association | |

In 2009, France, Italy, San Marino and Denmark left FIPPA, after the creation of another international association, the International Pitch and Putt Association (IPPA).

== EPPA ==
Following initial discussions, held at the inaugural European Pitch and Putt Championship in Chelmsford in the UK in June 1999, the European Pitch and Putt Association (EPPA) was formally launched in early 2000. The EPPA's members include organisations representing Andorra, Catalonia, the United Kingdom, Netherlands, Norway, Ireland, Switzerland, Galicia, France, Basque region, Slovenia and Ukraine.

== See also ==
- International Pitch and Putt Association
