= European Pitch and putt Championship =

International pitch and putt competition

The European Pitch and putt Championship is the team championship promoted by the European Pitch and Putt Association (EPPA), and was first held in 1999.

== European championships ==
The champions so far are:

Year	Host	Champion	Second place	Third place
1999	Chelmsford (Great Britain)	Ireland	Great Britain	Italy
2001	Lloret de Mar (Catalonia)	Ireland	Catalonia	Italy
2003	McDonagh (Ireland)	Ireland	Catalonia	France
2005	Overbetuwe (The Netherlands)	Ireland	Netherlands	Catalonia
2007	Chia (Italy)	Ireland	Catalonia	Great Britain
2010	Lloret de Mar (Catalonia)	Catalonia	Ireland	Netherlands
2014	El Torrent (Andorra)	Catalonia	Netherlands	Galicia
2018	Orduña (Basque Country)	Ireland	Catalonia	Andorra

== See also ==
- European Pitch and Putt Association
