= European Pitch and Putt Association =

Sports governing body in Europe

The European Pitch and Putt Association (EPPA) is the governing body for pitch and putt in Europe.

== History ==
It was formed in 2000 by representatives from the Pitch and Putt Union of Ireland (Ireland), British Pitch and Putt Union (Great Britain), Associació Catalana de Pitch and Putt (Catalonia), Association Française de Pitch and Putt (France), Pitch and Putt Bond Nederland (Netherlands) and Federazione Italiana de Pitch and Putt (Italy).

Lately, other members joined EPPA: Dansk Pitch and Putt Union (Denmark), Norges Pitch & Putt Forbund (Norway), Scweizerischen Pitch and Putt Verband (Switzerland), Federazione Sanmarinese Pitch and Putt (San Marino) Associació Andorrana de Pitch and Putt (Andorra), Deutscher Pitch & Putt Verband (Germany) and Asociación Gallega de Pitch and Putt (Galicia).

EPPA's headquarters are in Dublin (Ireland), and the president is Mervyn Cooney of the Pitch and Putt Union of Ireland. Brand (Norway) and the board members are Brigitte Albisetti (Switzerland), Toni Lloret (Catalonia) and Michael Murphy (Ireland). Martin Whitelaw is the General Secretary.

European Pitch and Putt Association stages the European Pitch and putt Championship, played biennially from 1999 to 2007 and every 4 years since 2011, and the European Pitch and putt Strokeplay Championship, played since 2011.

== Members ==
European Pitch and Putt Association Members
	Member	Website
Andorra	Associació Andorrana de Pitch and Putt (AAPP)	
Catalonia	Federació Catalana de Pitch and putt (FCPP)	http://www.pitchandputt.cat/
(Galicia (Spain)) Galicia	Asociación Gallega de Pitch and Putt (AGPP)	www.pitchandputtgalicia.com
Germany	Deutscher Pitch & Putt Verband (DPPV)	http://www.dppv.de/
(United Kingdom) Great Britain	British Pitch and Putt Association (BPPA)	http://www.bppa.org.uk/
(Republic of Ireland) Ireland	Pitch and Putt Union of Ireland (PPUI)	http://www.ppui.ie/
Netherlands	Nederlandse Pitch&Putt Bond (NPPB)	http://www.nppb.nl
Norway	Norges Pitch & Putt Forbund (NPPF)	http://www.pitch-putt.no/
Switzerland	Schweizerischen Pitch and Putt Verband (SPPF)	http://www.sppf.ch/

- In 2009, Association Française de Pitch and Putt (France), Federazione Italiana de Pitch and Putt (Italy), Federazione Sanmarinese Pitch and Putt (San Marino) and Dansk Pitch and Putt Union (Denmark) vacate their membership of EPPA, after the creation of another international association, IPPA.

== See also ==
- European Pitch and putt Championship
