= Pitch and Putt World Cup =

The Pitch and Putt World Cup is the Teams championship promoted by the Federation of International Pitch and Putt Associations (FIPPA) played every four years.

== World championships ==
	Year	Host	Champion	Second place	Third place
I Details	2004	Chia (Italy)	Catalonia	Netherlands	France
II Details	2006	Teià (Catalonia)	Catalonia	Andorra	(Republic of Ireland) Ireland
III Details	2008	Papendal (Netherlands)	(Republic of Ireland) Ireland	Netherlands	Catalonia
IV Details	2012	Royal Meath (Ireland)	(Republic of Ireland) Ireland	Australia	Netherlands
V Details	2016	El Torrent (Andorra)	(Republic of Ireland) Ireland	Catalonia	(Galicia (Spain)) Galicia
VI Details	2024	El Vendrell (Catalonia)	(Republic of Ireland) Ireland	Catalonia	North Portugal

== See also ==
- Pitch and putt World Strokeplay Championship
