= Pitch and putt =

Amateur sport derived from golf

- The "par 2" or pitch and putt course in Shibden Hall, England
- Highest governing body: Federation of International Pitch and Putt Associations; International Pitch and Putt Association
- First played: 20th Century, Ireland

Characteristics
- Contact: No
- Type: Outdoor
- Equipment: Ball, clubs, tee

Pitch and putt is an amateur sport very similar to, and derived from, golf, where the hole length is typically up to 90 metres (100 yd) and just 2–3 clubs are normally used. The game was organised and developed in Ireland during the early 20th century, before expanding through the 1940s, and is now played in dozens of countries.

== History ==
The Federation of International Pitch and Putt Associations suggests that the organised game of pitch and putt was developed in Ireland in the late 1920s, before being developed through the 1940s and then spreading internationally. The game was recognised as its own sport separate from golf by the European Golf Association (EGA) in 2002.

A European governing body was formed in 1999–2000, and then a first global governing body by 17 countries in 2006. Following this, in 2009, four countries separated and formed a second world body with two other countries.

=== Governing bodies and philosophies ===
The first-formed governing body, the Federation of International Pitch and Putt Associations (FIPPA), with the body from which it was formed, the European Pitch and Putt Association (EPPA), sees Pitch and Putt as a separate sport drawing on golf, and maintains cordial relations with golfing bodies, but does not adopt their rules "wholesale".

The other governing body, the IPPA, sees Pitch and Putt as a "golf speciality", and uses the Rules of Golf, with two major variations, and a focus on shorter distances between holes.

== Gameplay ==
The original rules developed in Ireland have been subject to variations as the game has spread, and today each country can devise its own rules. The game is played from raised artificial teeing surfaces using a tee and it has its own handicap system.

For international competitions, countries working within the IPPA framework look to the Rules of Golf (which are published by the Royal and Ancient and the USGA), while those working within the FIPPA / EPPA framework uses those bodies' shared rules, operating autonomously from the golf authorities.

For international competitions:

- the maximum hole length is 90 metres (100 yd);
- the maximum total course length of 1,200 metres (1,310 yd);
- players may only use a maximum of three clubs, one of which must be a putter.

== International associations ==
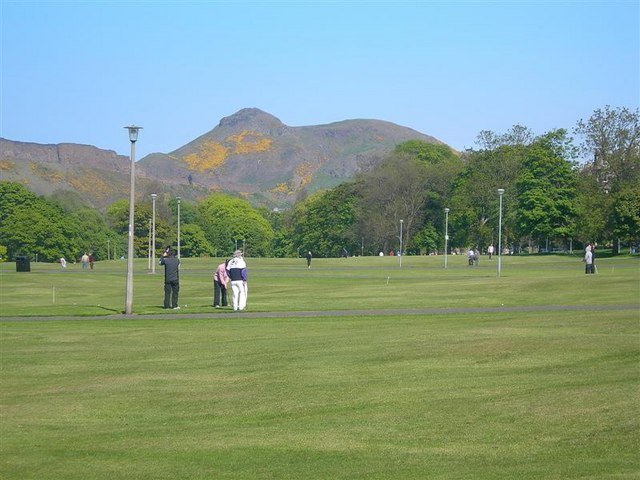
Pitch and putt on Bruntsfield links in Edinburgh, with Arthur's Seat behind

In addition to national associations, the game has been organised internationally by the European Pitch and Putt Association (EPPA) since 1999, by the Federation of International Pitch and Putt Associations (FIPPA) since 2006 and by the International Pitch and Putt Association (IPPA) since 2009.

The European Pitch and Putt Association (EPPA) was founded at a meeting in Dublin in 1999 by representatives from Ireland, Great Britain, the Catalonian regional association in Spain, France, the Netherlands and Italy. Later, Norway, Switzerland, San Marino, Denmark, Andorra and Germany joined the EPPA. The European Pitch and Putt Association stages a biennial European Team Championship.

The Federation of International Pitch and Putt Associations (FIPPA) was created in March 2006 in a meeting in Barcelona by representatives of 17 pitch and putt associations. FIPPA's original members included Ireland, Catalonia, Norway, Great Britain, Switzerland, Australia, Chile, Andorra, and the United States. Canada, China, and Germany were associate members. The Federation of International Pitch and Putt Associations stages a biennial Pitch and Putt World Cup and, since 2009, the Pitch and putt World Strokeplay Championship. The EPPA and the FIPPA work together, and share a website.

The International Pitch and Putt Association (IPPA) was formed in 2009, with France, Italy, San Marino, and Denmark as founder members. At a joint meeting of the governing councils of the EPPA and FIPPA, the matter was discussed, and after votes to continue EPPA and FIPPA, and further to disallow joint membership, the four countries left the older organisations; they were joined in IPPA by Spain and Portugal. The EPPA and FIPPA wished the departing countries wellm and thanked them for their work in developing the sport. The two governing bodies met on occasion, and released a joint communique in 2013, pledging to work together to grow the sport.

In January 2013, a group split off from the French Pitch and Putt governing body, a member of the IPPA, and joined the EPPA and FIPPA as the South France Pitch and Putt Association. In January 2024, the IPPA released a statement from the Royal and Ancient supporting the continued development of pitch and putt as a part of the golf family.
