= September 2010 in sports =

<<	September 2010					>>
Su	Mo	Tu	We	Th	Fr	Sa
			1	2	3	4
5	6	7	8	9	10	11
12	13	14	15	16	17	18
19	20	21	22	23	24	25
26	27	28	29	30
Sports

This list shows notable sports-related deaths, events, and notable outcomes that occurred in September of 2010.

== Deaths in September ==
- 1: Wakanohana Kanji I
- 5: Shoya Tomizawa
- 27: George Blanda
- 27: Real Quiet

== Sporting seasons ==
=== American football 2010 ===
- National Football League
- NCAA Division I FBS
- NCAA Division I FCS

=== Australian rules football 2010 ===
- Australian Football League

=== Auto racing 2010 ===
- Formula One
- Sprint Cup
  - Chase
- IRL IndyCar Series
- World Rally Championship
- Formula Two
- Nationwide Series
- Camping World Truck Series
- GP2 Series
- WTTC
- V8 Supercar
- American Le Mans
- Superleague Formula
- FIA GT1 World Championship
- Formula Three
- Auto GP
- World Series by Renault
- Deutsche Tourenwagen Masters
- Super GT

=== Baseball 2010 ===
- Major League Baseball
- Nippon Professional Baseball

=== Basketball 2010 ===
- Euroleague
- Eurocup
- Philippines collegiate:
  - NCAA
  - UAAP

=== Canadian football 2010 ===
- Canadian Football League

=== Football (soccer) 2010 ===
National teams competitions

- UEFA Euro 2012 qualifying
- 2011 FIFA Women's World Cup qualification (UEFA)
- 2011 UEFA European Under-21 Championship qualification
- 2012 Africa Cup of Nations qualification

International clubs competitions

- UEFA (Europe) Champions League
- Europa League
- UEFA Women's Champions League
- Copa Sudamericana
- AFC (Asia) Champions League
- AFC Cup
- CAF (Africa) Champions League
- CAF Confederation Cup
- CONCACAF (North & Central America) Champions League

Domestic (national) competitions

- Argentina
- Australia
- Brazil
- England
- France
- Germany
- Iran
- Italy
- Japan
- Norway
- Russia
- Scotland
- Spain
- Major League Soccer (USA & Canada)
- Women's Professional Soccer (USA)

=== Golf 2010 ===
- PGA Tour
- European Tour
- LPGA Tour
- Champions Tour

=== Lacrosse 2010 ===
- Major League Lacrosse

=== Motorcycle racing 2010 ===
- Moto GP
- Superbike World Championship
- Supersport racing

=== Rugby league 2010 ===
- Super League
- NRL

=== Rugby union 2010 ===
- 2011 Rugby World Cup qualifying
- English Premiership
- Celtic League
- Top 14
- Currie Cup
- ITM Cup

=== Snooker ===
- Players Tour Championship

== Days of the month ==
=== September 30, 2010 (Thursday) ===
==== Baseball ====
- Major League Baseball: The San Francisco Giants clinch at least a tie for the National League West title with a 4–1 win over the Arizona Diamondbacks.

==== Basketball ====
- UAAP at Quezon City:
  - Men's Finals: Ateneo de Manila University 65, Far Eastern University 62, **Ateneo win best-of-3 series 2–0**
    - Ateneo clinch their third consecutive, sixth UAAP and 20th men's championship.
  - Women's Finals: Adamson University 56, Far Eastern University 54, **Adamson win best-of-3 series 2–0**
    - Adamson win their second consecutive and sixth UAAP women's championship.

==== Cricket ====
- Ireland in Zimbabwe:
  - 3rd ODI in Harare: Ireland 244 (49.4 overs; Ed Rainsford 5/36); Zimbabwe 224 (47.4 overs). **Ireland win by 20 runs; Zimbabwe win 3-match series 2–1.**

==== Cycling ====
- UCI Road World Championships in Melbourne and Geelong, Australia:
  - Men's time trial: (gold) Fabian Cancellara (SUI) 58:09.19 (silver) David Millar (GBR) 59:11.94 (bronze) Tony Martin (GER) 59:21.68
    - Cancellara wins the event for the second successive time and record fourth time overall.

==== Equestrianism ====
- FEI World Games in Lexington, Kentucky, United States:
  - Reining Individual Final Competition: (gold) Tom McCutcheon (USA) on Gunners Special Nite 228.0 points (silver) Craig Schmersal (USA) on Mister Montana Nic 223.0 (bronze) Duane Latimer (CAN) on Dun Playin Tag 222.5

==== Figure skating ====
- ISU Junior Grand Prix in Sheffield, Great Britain:
  - Ladies Short Program: (1) Adelina Sotnikova (RUS) 59.39 (2) Yasmin Siraj (USA) 55.66 (3) Yuki Nishino (JPN) 51.96
  - Pairs Short Program: (1) Ksenia Stolbova / Fedor Klimov (RUS) 54.17 (2) Taylor Steele / Robert Schultz (CAN) 46.94 (3) Natasha Purich / Raymond Schultz (CAN) 45.11
  - Men Short Program: (1) Joshua Farris (USA) 59.79 (2) Liam Firus (CAN) 59.20 (3) Keiji Tanaka (JPN) 58.28

==== Football (soccer) ====
- OFC Women's Championship in Auckland, New Zealand:
  - Group B:
    - Papua New Guinea 3–0 Fiji
    - Solomon Islands 4–0 Tonga
- UEFA Europa League group stage, matchday 2:
  - Group A:
    - Lech Poznań (Poland) 2–0 (Austria) Red Bull Salzburg
    - Manchester City (England) 1–1 (Italy) Juventus
      - Standings (after 2 matches): Lech Poznań, Manchester City 4 points, Juventus 2, Red Bull Salzburg 0.
  - Group B:
    - Rosenborg (Norway) 2–1 (Greece) Aris
    - Atlético Madrid (Spain) 1–1 (Germany) Bayer Leverkusen
      - Standings (after 2 matches): Bayer Leverkusen 4 points, Aris, Rosenborg 3, Atlético Madrid 1.
  - Group C:
    - Gent (Belgium) 1–1 (France) Lille
    - Sporting CP (Portugal) 5–0 (Bulgaria) Levski Sofia
      - Standings (after 2 matches): Sporting CP 6 points, Levski Sofia 3, Gent, Lille 1.
  - Group D:
    - PAOK (Greece) 1–0 (Croatia) Dinamo Zagreb
    - Villarreal (Spain) 2–1 (Belgium) Club Brugge
      - Standings (after 2 matches): PAOK 4 points, Dinamo Zagreb, Villarreal 3, Club Brugge 1.
  - Group E:
    - BATE (Belarus) 4–1 (Netherlands) AZ
    - Sheriff Tiraspol (Moldova) 2–0 (Ukraine) Dynamo Kyiv
      - Standings (after 2 matches): BATE 4 points, AZ, Sheriff Tiraspol 3, Dynamo Kyiv 1.
  - Group F:
    - CSKA Moscow (Russia) 3–0 (Czech Republic) Sparta Prague
    - Palermo (Italy) 1–0 (Switzerland) Lausanne-Sport
      - Standings (after 2 matches): CSKA Moscow 6 points, Sparta Prague, Palermo 3, Lausanne-Sport 0.
  - Group G:
    - Hajduk Split (Croatia) 1–0 (Belgium) Anderlecht
    - Zenit St. Petersburg (Russia) 4–2 (Greece) AEK Athens
      - Standings (after 2 matches): Zenit St. Petersburg 6 points, AEK Athens, Hajduk Split 3, Anderlecht 0.
  - Group H:
    - Odense (Denmark) 1–2 (Germany) Stuttgart
    - Young Boys (Switzerland) 2–0 (Spain) Getafe
      - Standings (after 2 matches): Stuttgart 6 points, Young Boys, Getafe 3, Odense 0.
  - Group I:
    - Sampdoria (Italy) 1–0 (Hungary) Debrecen
    - Metalist Kharkiv (Ukraine) 0–2 (Netherlands) PSV Eindhoven
      - Standings (after 2 matches): PSV Eindhoven, Sampdoria 4 points, Metalist Kharkiv 3, Debrecen 0.
  - Group J:
    - Paris Saint-Germain (France) 2–0 (Ukraine) Karpaty Lviv
    - Borussia Dortmund (Germany) 0–1 (Spain) Sevilla
      - Standings (after 2 matches): Paris Saint-Germain 6 points, Sevilla, Borussia Dortmund 3, Karpaty Lviv 0.
  - Group K:
    - Steaua București (Romania) 3–3 (Italy) Napoli
    - Utrecht (Netherlands) 0–0 (England) Liverpool
      - Standings (after 2 matches): Liverpool 4 points, Napoli, Utrecht 2, Steaua București 1.
  - Group L:
    - Rapid Wien (Austria) 1–2 (Turkey) Beşiktaş
    - CSKA Sofia (Bulgaria) 0–1 (Portugal) Porto
      - Standings (after 2 matches): Porto, Beşiktaş 6 points, CSKA Sofia, Rapid Wien 0.
- CONCACAF Champions League group stage, matchday 5:
  - Group D: FAS (El Salvador) 1–4 (Honduras) Olimpia
    - Standings (after 5 matches): Olimpia 10 points, Puerto Rico Islanders 8, (Mexico) Toluca 7, FAS 2.

==== Snooker ====
- Premier League Snooker – League phase in Plymouth:
  - **Marco Fu** (HKG) 4–2 Shaun Murphy (ENG)
  - Ding Junhui (CHN) 3–3 Mark Williams (WAL)
  - Neil Robertson (AUS) 2–4 **Mark Selby** (ENG)
    - Standings: Fu, Williams 3 points (2 matches), Murphy 2 (2), Ding 2 (3), Ronnie O'Sullivan (ENG), Selby 2 (2), Robertson 0 (1).

==== Volleyball ====
- Men's World Championship in Italy:
  - Pool G in Catania: Puerto Rico 0–3 Germany
  - Pool H in Milan: Cuba 1–3 Serbia
  - Pool I in Catania: Russia 3–0 Egypt
  - Pool L in Ancona: United States 0–3 Czech Republic
  - Pool M in Milan: France 1–3 Argentina
  - Pool N in Ancona: Poland 0–3 Brazil

=== September 29, 2010 (Wednesday) ===
==== Basketball ====
- FIBA World Championship for Women in Czech Republic: (teams in **bold** advance to the quarterfinals)
  - Group E in Ostrava:
    - Greece 70–74 **Belarus**
    - **France** 49–47 Canada
    - **United States** 83–75 **Australia**
      - Final standings: USA 12 points, Australia 11, France 10, Belarus 9, Greece 8, Canada 7.
  - Group F in Brno:
    - Japan 64–65 **South Korea**
    - **Czech Republic** 84–70 Brazil
    - **Russia** 76–67 **Spain**
      - Final standings: Russia 12 points, Spain 11, Czech Republic 10, Korea 9, Brazil 8, Japan 7.
  - 15th place playoff: Senegal 67–69 (OT) **Mali**
  - 13th place playoff: **China** 86–60 Argentina

==== Cycling ====
- UCI Road World Championships in Melbourne and Geelong, Australia:
  - Women's time trial: (gold) Emma Pooley (GBR) 32:48.44 (silver) Judith Arndt (GER) 33:03.61 (bronze) Linda Villumsen (NZL) 33:04.24
  - Men's under-23 time trial: (gold) Taylor Phinney (USA) 42:50.29 (silver) Luke Durbridge (AUS) 42:52.19 (bronze) Marcel Kittel (GER) 43:14.30

==== Equestrianism ====
- FEI World Games in Lexington, Kentucky, United States:
  - Dressage Grand Prix Special: (gold) Edward Gal (NED) on Moorlands Totilas 85.708% (silver) Laura Bechtolsheimer (GBR) on Mistral Hojris 81.708% (bronze) Steffen Peters (USA) on Ravel 78.542%

==== Football (soccer) ====
- OFC Women's Championship in Auckland, New Zealand:
  - Group A:
    - New Zealand 14–0 Vanuatu
    - Cook Islands 1–0 Tahiti
- WAFF Championship in Amman, Jordan: (teams in **bold** advance to the semifinals)
  - Group C: Palestine 0–3 **Iraq**
    - Final standings: Iraq 6 points, **Yemen** 3, Palestine 0.
- UEFA Champions League group stage, matchday 2:
  - Group A:
    - Tottenham Hotspur (England) 4–1 (Netherlands) Twente
    - Internazionale (Italy) 4–0 (Germany) Werder Bremen
      - Standings (after 2 matches): Internazionale, Tottenham Hotspur 4 points, Twente, Werder Bremen 1.
  - Group B:
    - Hapoel Tel Aviv (Israel) 1–3 (France) Lyon
    - Schalke 04 (Germany) 2–0 (Portugal) Benfica
      - Standings (after 2 matches): Lyon 6 points, Schalke 04, Benfica 3, Hapoel Tel Aviv 0.
  - Group C:
    - Valencia (Spain) 0–1 (England) Manchester United
    - Rangers (Scotland) 1–0 (Turkey) Bursaspor
      - Standings (after 2 matches): Manchester United, Rangers 4 points, Valencia 3, Bursaspor 0.
  - Group D:
    - Rubin Kazan (Russia) 1–1 (Spain) Barcelona
    - Panathinaikos (Greece) 0–2 (Denmark) Copenhagen
      - Standings (after 2 matches): Copenhagen 6 points, Barcelona 4, Rubin Kazan 1, Panathinaikos 0.
- Copa Sudamericana Round of 16, first leg:
  - Banfield (Argentina) 2–0 (Colombia) Deportes Tolima
- CONCACAF Champions League group stage, matchday 5: (teams in **bold** advance to the quarterfinals)
  - Group B:
    - Municipal (Guatemala) 2–1 (United States) Columbus Crew
    - Santos Laguna (Mexico) 5–1 (Trinidad and Tobago) Joe Public
      - Standings (after 5 matches): Santos Laguna 10 points, Columbus Crew 9, Municipal 8, Joe Public 1.
  - Group C: Seattle Sounders FC (United States) 2–0 (Honduras) Marathón
    - Standings (after 5 matches): (Mexico) **Monterrey** 13 points, (Costa Rica) Saprissa 7, Marathón 6, Seattle Sounders FC 3.
  - Group D: Puerto Rico Islanders 3–2 (Mexico) Toluca
    - Standings: Puerto Rico Islanders 8 points (5 matches), Toluca 7 (5), (Honduras) Olimpia 7 (4), (El Salvador) FAS 0 (4).

=== September 28, 2010 (Tuesday) ===
==== Baseball ====
- Major League Baseball
  - National League:
    - Jay Bruce's first pitch walk-off homer to lead off the bottom of the ninth inning gives the Cincinnati Reds a 3–2 win over the Houston Astros and the Central Division championship, their first since 1995, ending the fifth longest period between postseason appearances.
  - American League:
    - The Tampa Bay Rays defeat the Baltimore Orioles 5–0 while the New York Yankees beat the Toronto Blue Jays 6–1, filling out the complete American League postseason card, and eliminating the Boston Red Sox from playoff contention for the first time since 2006.

==== Basketball ====
- FIBA World Championship for Women in the Czech Republic: (teams in **bold** advance to the quarterfinals)
  - Group E in Ostrava:
    - Canada 52–57 Greece
    - **Australia** 62–52 **France**
    - Belarus 61–107 **United States**
      - Standings (after 5 games): USA, Australia 10 points, France 8, Greece, Belarus 7, Canada 6.
  - Group F in Brno:
    - Brazil 93–91 (OT) Japan
    - **Spain** 77–57 Czech Republic
    - South Korea 48–81 **Russia**
      - Standings (after 5 games): Spain, Russia 10 points, Czech Republic 8, Brazil, Korea 7, Japan 6.
  - 13th–16th semifinals:
    - **China** 71–69 Senegal
    - Mali 69–74 (OT) **Argentina**

==== Cricket ====
- Ireland in Zimbabwe:
  - 2nd ODI in Harare: Ireland 238/9 (50 overs); Zimbabwe 239/7 (48.5 overs). **Zimbabwe win by 3 wickets; lead 3-match series 2–0.**

==== Equestrianism ====
- FEI World Games in Lexington, Kentucky, United States:
  - Dressage Team Grand Prix: (gold) Netherlands 229.745% (silver) Great Britain 224.767% (bronze) Germany 220.595%

==== Football (soccer) ====
- WAFF Championship in Amman, Jordan: (teams in **bold** advance to the semifinals)
  - Group A: Oman 2–2 **Iran**
    - Final standings: Iran 4 points, Bahrain 3, Oman 1.
  - Group B: **Kuwait** 2–2 Jordan
    - Final standings: Kuwait 4 points, Jordan 2, Syria 1.
- UEFA Champions League group stage, matchday 2:
  - Group E:
    - Basel (Switzerland) 1–2 (Germany) Bayern Munich
    - Roma (Italy) 2–1 (Romania) CFR Cluj
      - Standings (after 2 matches): Bayern Munich 6 points, Roma, CFR Cluj 3, Basel 0.
  - Group F:
    - Chelsea (England) 2–0 (France) Marseille
    - Spartak Moscow (Russia) 3–0 (Slovakia) Žilina
      - Standings (after 2 matches): Chelsea, Spartak Moscow 6 points, Marseille, Žilina 0.
  - Group G:
    - Auxerre (France) 0–1 (Spain) Real Madrid
    - Ajax (Netherlands) 1–1 (Italy) Milan
      - Standings (after 2 matches): Real Madrid 6 points, Milan 4, Ajax 1, Auxerre 0.
  - Group H:
    - Partizan (Serbia) 1–3 (England) Arsenal
    - Braga (Portugal) 0–3 (Ukraine) Shakhtar Donetsk
      - Standings (after 2 matches): Arsenal, Shakhtar Donetsk 6 points, Partizan, Braga 0.
- Copa Sudamericana Round of 16, first leg:
  - Defensor Sporting (Uruguay) 1–0 (Argentina) Independiente
- CONCACAF Champions League group stage, matchday 5: (teams in **bold** advance to the quarterfinals)
  - Group A:
    - Toronto FC (Canada) 1–1 (United States) **Real Salt Lake**
    - **Cruz Azul** (Mexico) 2–0 (Panama) Árabe Unido
      - Standings (after 5 matches): Cruz Azul, Real Salt Lake 10 points, Toronto FC 5, Árabe Unido 3.
  - Group C: Saprissa (Costa Rica) 2–2 (Mexico) **Monterrey**
    - Standings: Monterrey 13 points (5 matches), Saprissa 7 (5), (Honduras) Marathón 6 (4), (United States) Seattle Sounders FC 0 (4).

=== September 27, 2010 (Monday) ===
==== American football ====
- NFL Monday Night Football Week 3: Chicago Bears 20, Green Bay Packers 17

==== Baseball ====
- Major League Baseball:
  - Roy Halladay's two-hit complete game leads the Philadelphia Phillies to an 8–0 win over the Washington Nationals that clinches the Phils' fourth straight NL East title.

==== Basketball ====
- FIBA World Championship for Women in the Czech Republic: (teams in **bold** advance to the quarterfinals)
  - Group E in Ostrava:
    - Greece 54–93 **Australia**
    - France 58–48 Belarus
    - **United States** 87–46 Canada
      - Standings (after 4 games): USA, Australia 8 points, France 7, Belarus 6, Greece, Canada 5.
  - Group F in Brno:
    - Japan 59–86 **Spain**
    - Czech Republic 96–65 South Korea
    - **Russia** 76–53 Brazil
      - Standings (after 4 games): Spain, Russia 8 points, Czech Republic 7, Korea 6, Japan, Brazil 5.

==== Football (soccer) ====
- WAFF Championship in Amman, Jordan:
  - Group C: Yemen 3–1 Palestine

==== Volleyball ====
- Men's World Championship in Italy: (teams in **bold** advance to the second round)
  - Pool A in Milan:
    - **Japan** 3–2 **Egypt**
    - **Italy** 3–2 Iran
      - Final standings: Italy 6 points, Egypt, Japan, Iran 4.
  - Pool B in Verona:
    - **Spain** 3–1 Tunisia
    - **Cuba** 3–2 **Brazil**
      - Final standings: Cuba 6 points, Brazil 5, Spain 4, Tunisia 3.
  - Pool C in Modena:
    - Australia 1–3 **Cameroon**
    - **Puerto Rico** 2–3 **Russia**
      - Final standings: Russia 6 points, Puerto Rico 5, Cameroon 4, Australia 3.
  - Pool D in Reggio Calabria:
    - **Mexico** 3–0 Venezuela
    - **United States** 3–1 **Argentina**
      - Final standings: United States 6 points, Argentina 5, Mexico 4, Venezuela 3.
  - Pool E in Turin:
    - **Bulgaria** 1–3 **Czech Republic**
    - China 0–3 **France**
      - Final standings: France 6 points, Czech Republic 5, Bulgaria 4, China 3.
  - Pool F in Trieste:
    - **Germany** 3–0 Canada
    - **Serbia** 1–3 **Poland**
      - Final standings: Poland 6 points, Serbia, Germany, Canada 4.

=== September 26, 2010 (Sunday) ===
==== American football ====
- NFL Week 3:
  - Tennessee Titans 29, New York Giants 10
  - Pittsburgh Steelers 38, Tampa Bay Buccaneers 13
  - Cincinnati Bengals 20, Carolina Panthers 7
  - Baltimore Ravens 24, Cleveland Browns 17
  - Dallas Cowboys 27, Houston Texans 13
  - Kansas City Chiefs 31, San Francisco 49ers 10
  - Minnesota Vikings 24, Detroit Lions 10
  - New England Patriots 38, Buffalo Bills 30
  - Atlanta Falcons 27, New Orleans Saints 24 (OT)
  - St. Louis Rams 30, Washington Redskins 16
  - Philadelphia Eagles 28, Jacksonville Jaguars 3
  - Arizona Cardinals 24, Oakland Raiders 23
  - Seattle Seahawks 27, San Diego Chargers 20
  - Indianapolis Colts 27, Denver Broncos 13
  - Sunday Night Football: New York Jets 31, Miami Dolphins 23

==== Athletics ====
- World Marathon Majors:
  - Berlin Marathon:
    - Men: (gold) Patrick Makau Musyoki (KEN) 2:05:08 (silver) Geoffrey Mutai (KEN) 2:05:10 (bronze) Bazu Worku (ETH) 2:05.25
    - Women: (gold) Aberu Kebede (ETH) 2:23:58 (silver) Bezunesh Bekele (ETH) 2:24:58 (bronze) Tomo Morimoto (JPN) 2:26:10

==== Auto racing ====
- Formula One:
  - Singapore Grand Prix in Marina Bay, Singapore: (1) Fernando Alonso (ESP) (Ferrari) (2) Sebastian Vettel (GER) (Red Bull–Renault) (3) Mark Webber (AUS) (Red Bull-Renault)
    - Drivers' championship standings (after 15 of 19 races): (1) Webber 202 points (2) Alonso 191 (3) Lewis Hamilton (GBR) (McLaren–Mercedes) 182
    - Constructors' championship standings: (1) Red Bull 383 points (2) McLaren 359 (3) Ferrari 319
- Chase for the Sprint Cup:
  - AAA 400 in Dover, Delaware: (1) (California) Jimmie Johnson (Chevrolet; Hendrick Motorsports) (2) (Virginia) Jeff Burton (Chevrolet; Richard Childress Racing) (3) (Connecticut) Joey Logano (Toyota; Joe Gibbs Racing)
    - Drivers' championship standings (after 28 of 36 races): (1) (Virginia) Denny Hamlin (Toyota; Joe Gibbs Racing) 5368 points (2) Johnson 5333 (3) (Nevada) Kyle Busch (Toyota; Joe Gibbs Racing) 5323

==== Badminton ====
- BWF Super Series:
  - Japan Super Series in Tokyo:
    - Men's singles: **Lee Chong Wei** (MAS) def. Lin Dan (CHN) 22–20, 16–21, 21–17
    - Women's singles: **Jiang Yanjiao** (CHN) def. Wang Xin (CHN) 23–21, 21–18
    - Men's doubles: **Cai Yun** (CHN)/**Fu Haifeng** (CHN) def. Koo Kien Keat (MAS)/Tan Boon Heong (MAS) 18–21, 21–14, 21–12
    - Women's doubles: **Wang Xiao Li** (CHN)/**Yu Yang** (CHN) def. Cheng Shu (CHN)/Zhao Yun Lei (CHN) 21–17, 21–6
    - Mixed doubles: **Zhang Nan** (CHN)/**Zhao Yunlei** (CHN) def. Tao Jiaming (CHN)/Tian Qing (CHN) 21–19, 22–20

==== Baseball ====
- Major League Baseball:
  - The Philadelphia Phillies fail to clinch the NL East title, losing 7–3 to the New York Mets in their final home game of the season, but other results make them the first National League team to clinch a postseason berth.

==== Cricket ====
- Ireland in Zimbabwe:
  - 1st ODI in Harare: Ireland 200 (47.3 overs); Zimbabwe 206/8 (50 overs). **Zimbabwe win by 2 wickets; lead 3-match series 1–0.**

==== Equestrianism ====
- FEI World Games in Lexington, Kentucky, United States:
  - Reining Team Competition: (gold) United States 674.5 points (silver) Belgium 659 (bronze) Italy 655.5
  - Endurance Team Competition: (gold) United Arab Emirates 23:53:36 (silver) France 24:49:46 (bronze) Germany 25:34:16
  - Endurance Individual Competition: (gold) Maria Mercedes Alvarez Ponton (ESP) on Nobby 7:35:44 (silver) Mohammed bin Rashid Al Maktoum (UAE) on Ciel Oriental 7:36:39 (bronze) Hamdan bin Mohammed Al Maktoum (UAE) on SAS Alexis 7:36:56

==== Figure skating ====
- ISU Junior Grand Prix in Karuizawa, Nagano, Japan: (skaters in **bold** qualify for ISU Junior Grand Prix Final)
  - Ice Dance: (gold) **Alexandra Stepanova / Ivan Bukin** (RUS) 130.08 (silver) Ekaterina Pushkash / Jonathan Guerreiro (RUS) 129.71 (bronze) Geraldine Bott / Neil Brown (FRA) 123.65
    - Standings (after 4 of 7 events): Stepanova / Bukin 30 points (2 events), Anastasia Cannuscio / Colin McManus (USA) 22 (2), Gabriella Papadakis / Guillaume Cizeron (FRA) 20 (2), Bott / Brown 18 (2), Ksenia Monko / Kirill Khaliavin (RUS), Charlotte Lichtman / Dean Copley (USA) 15 (1), Pushkash / Guerreiro, Victoria Sinitsina / Ruslan Zhiganshin (RUS), Anastasia Galyeta / Alexei Shumski (UKR) 13 (1).

==== Football (soccer) ====
- WAFF Championship in Amman, Jordan:
  - Group A: Bahrain 2–0 Oman
  - Group B: Syria 1–2 Kuwait
- (United States) Women's Professional Soccer Championship in Hayward, California:
  - **FC Gold Pride** 4–0 Philadelphia Independence
    - FC Gold Pride win the championship for the first time.

==== Gymnastics ====
- World Rhythmic Gymnastics Championships in Moscow, Russia:
  - Groups hoops: (gold) Russia 27.975 points (silver) Italy 27.875 (bronze) Bulgaria 27.100
  - Groups ribbons and ropes: (gold) Russia 28.050 points (silver) Italy 27.900 (bronze) Belarus 27.150

==== Golf ====
- PGA Tour:
  - FedEx Cup Playoffs: The Tour Championship in Atlanta:
    - Winner: Jim Furyk (USA) 272 (−8)
    - Final FedEx Cup standings: (1) Furyk 2980 points (2) Matt Kuchar (USA) 2727 (3) Luke Donald (ENG) 2700
      - Furyk wins his 16th PGA Tour title and in doing so, wins his first FedEx Cup title.
- European Tour:
  - Vivendi Cup in Chambourcy, France:
    - Winner: John Parry (ENG) 271 (−17)
      - Parry wins his first European Tour title.
- Champions Tour:
  - SAS Championship in Cary, North Carolina:
    - Winner: Russ Cochran (USA) 202 (−14)
      - Cochran wins his second Champions Tour title in as many events.

==== Korfball ====
- Europa Cup first round in Wrocław, Poland:
  - Pool A:
    - Ceské Budějovice (Czech Republic) 18–6 (Poland) AZS Wrocław
    - Trojans (England) 9–11 (Catalonia) Vacarisses
    - Ceské Budějovice (Czech Republic) 21–3 (Scotland) St Andrews University
      - Final standings: Vacarisses 12 points, Ceské Budějovice 8, Trojans 7, AZS Wrocław 3, St Andrews U. 0.
  - Pool B:
    - CC Oeiras (Portugal) 13–9 (Hungary) SKK Prievidza
    - CC Oeiras (Portugal) 19–8 (Turkey) Kocaeli University
    - KV Adler Rauxel (Germany) 18–6 (France) Bonson FJEP
      - Final standings: CC Oeiras 12 points, KV Adler Rauxel 9, SKK Prievidza 6, Kocaeli U. 3, Bonson FJEP 0.
  - 5th place playoff: Trojans (England) 16–7 (Hungary) SKK Prievidza
  - Top five teams advance to the final round.

==== Motorcycle racing ====
- Superbike:
  - Imola Superbike World Championship round in Imola, Italy:
    - Race 1: (1) Carlos Checa (ESP) (Ducati 1098R) (2) Lorenzo Lanzi (ITA) (Ducati 1098R) (3) Noriyuki Haga (JPN) (Ducati 1098R)
    - Race 2: (1) Checa (2) Haga (3) Cal Crutchlow (GBR) (Yamaha YZF-R1)
      - Riders' championship standings (after 12 of 13 rounds): (1) Max Biaggi (ITA) (Aprilia RSV 4) 413 points (2) Leon Haslam (GBR) (Suzuki GSX-R1000) 350 (3) Jonathan Rea (GBR) (Honda CBR1000RR) 288
        - Biaggi becomes the first Italian to win the Superbike World Championship.
      - Manufacturers' championship standings: (1) Aprilia 433 points (2) Ducati 392 (3) Suzuki 379
- Supersport:
  - Imola Supersport World Championship round in Imola, Italy: (1) Michele Pirro (ITA) (Honda CBR600RR) (2) Kenan Sofuoğlu (TUR) (Honda CBR600RR) (3) Eugene Laverty (IRL) (Honda CBR600RR)
    - Riders' championship standings (after 12 of 13 rounds): (1) Sofuoğlu 243 points (2) Laverty 227 (3) Joan Lascorz (ESP) (Kawasaki Ninja ZX-6R) 168
    - Manufacturers' championship standings: (1) Honda 295 points (2) Kawasaki 201 (3) Triumph 152

==== Pitch and putt ====
- EPPA European Championship in Lloret de Mar, Catalonia:
  - 7th-8th places: **Switzerland** 7.5–0.5 Germany
  - 5th-6th places: **Andorra** 5.5–3.5 Norway
  - 3rd-4th places: (bronze) **Netherlands** 5.5–3.5 Great Britain
  - Final: (silver) Ireland 4–5 (gold) **Catalonia**
    - Catalonia win the title for the first time.

==== Snooker ====
- World Open in Glasgow, Scotland:
  - Semi-finals:
    - Peter Ebdon (ENG) 1–3 **Ronnie O'Sullivan** (ENG)
    - Mark Williams (WAL) 2–3 **Neil Robertson** (AUS)
  - Final: **Robertson** 5–1 O'Sullivan
    - Robertson defends his title, and wins the sixth ranking title of his career.

==== Table tennis ====
- Women's World Cup in Kuala Lumpur: (gold) Guo Yan (CHN) (silver) Jiang Huajun (HKG) (bronze) Guo Yue (CHN)

==== Tennis ====
- ATP World Tour:
  - Open de Moselle:
    - Final: **Gilles Simon** (FRA) def. Mischa Zverev (GER) 6–3, 6–2
      - Simon wins his seventh career title.
  - BCR Open Romania:
    - Final: **Juan Ignacio Chela** (ARG) def. Pablo Andújar (ESP) 7–5, 6–1
      - Chela wins his sixth career title.
- WTA Tour:
  - Hansol Korea Open:
    - Final: **Alisa Kleybanova** (RUS) def. Klára Zakopalová (CZE) 6–1, 6–3
      - Kleybanova wins her second career title.

==== Volleyball ====
- Men's World Championship in Italy: (teams in **bold** advance to the second round)
  - Pool A in Milan:
    - Iran 3–1 Japan
    - Egypt 0–3 **Italy**
      - Standings (after 2 games): Italy 4 points, Egypt, Iran 3, Japan 2.
  - Pool B in Verona:
    - Tunisia 0–3 **Cuba**
    - **Brazil** 3–1 Spain
      - Standings (after 2 games): Brazil, Cuba 4 points, Spain, Tunisia 2.
  - Pool C in Modena:
    - Cameroon 0–3 **Puerto Rico**
    - **Russia** 3–1 Australia
      - Standings (after 2 games): Russia, Puerto Rico 4 points, Australia, Cameroon 2.
  - Pool D in Reggio Calabria:
    - **Argentina** 3–1 Mexico
    - Venezuela 0–3 **United States**
      - Standings (after 2 games): Argentina, United States 4 points, Mexico, Venezuela 2.
  - Pool E in Turin:
    - Czech Republic 3–1 China
    - **France** 3–2 Bulgaria
      - Standings (after 2 games): France 4 points, Bulgaria, Czech Republic 3, China 2.
  - Pool F in Trieste:
    - Canada 3–1 Serbia
    - **Poland** 3–2 Germany
      - Standings (after 2 games): Poland 4, Canada, Serbia 3, Germany 2.

==== Weightlifting ====
- World Championships in Antalya, Turkey:
  - Men's 105 kg:
    - Total: (gold) Marcin Dołęga (POL) 415 kg (silver) Dmitry Klokov (RUS) 415 kg (bronze) Vladimir Smorchkov (RUS) 410 kg
    - Snatch: (gold) Klokov 192 kg (silver) Smorchkov 190 kg (bronze) Dołęga 188 kg
    - Clean & Jerk: (gold) Dołęga 227 kg (silver) Klokov 223 kg (bronze) Bartlomiej Bonk (POL) 170 kg
  - Men's +105 kg:
    - Total: (gold) Behdad Salimi (IRN) 453 kg (silver) Matthias Steiner (GER) 440 kg (bronze) Artem Udachyn (UKR) 440 kg
    - Snatch: (gold) Evgeny Chigishev (RUS) 210 kg (silver) Salimi 208 kg (bronze) Udachyn 205 kg
    - Clean & Jerk: (gold) Steiner 246 kg (silver) Salimi 245 kg (bronze) Jeon Sang-Guen (KOR) 242 kg

=== September 25, 2010 (Saturday) ===
==== American football ====
- NCAA:
  - AP Top 10:
    - (1) Alabama 24, (10) Arkansas 20
    - (2) Ohio State 73, Eastern Michigan 20
    - (3) Boise State 37, (24) Oregon State 24
    - (5) Oregon 42, Arizona State 31
    - (6) Nebraska 17, South Dakota State 3
    - UCLA 34, (7) Texas 12
    - (8) Oklahoma 31, Cincinnati 29
    - (9) Florida 48, Kentucky 14
  - Other games:
    - (17) Auburn 35, (12) South Carolina 27
    - (15) LSU 20, (22) West Virginia 14
  - Played earlier this week: (4) TCU

==== Australian rules football ====
- AFL finals series:
  - Grand Final in Melbourne: Collingwood 9.14 (68)–10.8 (68) St Kilda
    - The Magpies and Saints will return to the MCG on 2 October for the first Grand Final replay since 1977.

==== Auto racing ====
- Nationwide Series:
  - Dover 200 in Dover, Delaware: (1) (Nevada) Kyle Busch (Toyota; Joe Gibbs Racing) (2) (Connecticut) Joey Logano (Toyota; Joe Gibbs Racing) (3) (Missouri) Carl Edwards (Ford; Roush Fenway Racing)
    - Drivers' championship standings (after 28 of 35 races): (1) (Michigan) Brad Keselowski (Dodge; Penske Racing) 4414 points (2) Edwards 4094 (3) Busch 3914
    - Busch sets a new record for NASCAR's second-tier series with his 11th win of the season.

==== Baseball ====
- Major League Baseball:
  - The Texas Rangers clinch the AL West title with a 4–3 win over the Oakland Athletics.

==== Basketball ====
- FIBA World Championship for Women in the Czech Republic: (teams in **bold** advance to the main round)
  - Group A in Ostrava:
    - China 68–91 **Australia**
    - **Canada** 49–61 **Belarus**
      - Final standings: Australia 6 points, Belarus 5, Canada 4, China 3.
  - Group B in Ostrava:
    - **United States** 81–60 **France**
    - Senegal 68–83 **Greece**
      - Final standings: USA 6 points, France 5, Greece 4, Senegal 3.
  - Group C in Brno:
    - Mali 66–68 (OT) **South Korea**
    - **Brazil** 57–69 **Spain**
      - Final standings: Spain 6 points, Korea Republic 5, Brazil 4, Mali 3.
  - Group D in Brno:
    - Argentina 59–77 **Russia**
    - **Japan** 60–66 **Czech Republic**
      - Final standings: Russia 6 points, Czech Republic 5, Japan 4, Argentina 3.

==== Figure skating ====
- ISU Junior Grand Prix in Karuizawa, Nagano, Japan: (skaters in **bold** qualify for ISU Junior Grand Prix Final)
  - Men: (gold) **Andrei Rogozine** (CAN) 188.60 (silver) Max Aaron (USA) 179.82 (bronze) Abzal Rakimgaliev (KAZ) 172.28
    - Standings (after 4 of 7 events): Rogozine 30 points (2 events), Aaron 24 (2), Jason Brown (USA) 18 (2), Keegan Messing (USA), Yan Han (CHN) 15 (1), Thomas Sosniak (FRA) 14 (2), Joshua Farris (USA), Artem Grigoriev (RUS) 13 (1).
  - Ladies: (gold) Risa Shoji (JPN) 149.39 (silver) Kiri Baga (USA) 138.70 (bronze) Zhang Kexin (CHN) 134.08

==== Football (soccer) ====
- FIFA U-17 Women's World Cup in Trinidad and Tobago:
  - Third place match: (bronze) **Spain** 1–0 North Korea
  - Final: (gold) **South Korea** 3–3 (5–4 pen.) (silver) Japan
    - Korea Republic win their first title in any worldwide FIFA competition.
- WAFF Championship in Amman, Jordan:
  - Group C: Iraq 2–1 Yemen

==== Gymnastics ====
- World Rhythmic Gymnastics Championships in Moscow, Russia:
  - Groups all-around: (gold) Italy 55.525 (silver) Belarus 54.800 (bronze) Russia 52.425

==== Korfball ====
- Europa Cup first round in Wrocław, Poland:
  - Pool A:
    - AZS Wrocław (Poland) 23–4 (Scotland) St Andrews University
    - Ceské Budějovice (Czech Republic) 15–16 (Catalonia) Vacarisses
    - St Andrews University (Scotland) 2–27 (England) Trojans
    - Vacarisses (Catalonia) 20–10 (Poland) AZS Wrocław
    - Ceské Budějovice (Czech Republic) 11–10 (England) Trojans
  - Pool B:
    - SKK Prievidza (Hungary) 12–10 (Turkey) Kocaeli University
    - CC Oeiras (Portugal) 21–6 (France) Bonson FJEP
    - Kocaeli University (Turkey) 7–19 (Germany) KV Adler Rauxel
    - Bonson FJEP (France) 5–9 (Hungary) SKK Prievidza
    - CC Oeiras (Portugal) 13–9 (Germany) KV Adler Rauxel

==== Mixed martial arts ====
- UFC 119 in Indianapolis:
  - Heavyweight bout: Frank Mir (USA) def. Mirko Filipović (CRO) by KO (knee)
  - Light Heavyweight bout: Ryan Bader (USA) def. Antônio Rogério Nogueira (BRA) by unanimous decision (30–27, 30–27, 30–27)
  - Welterweight bout: Chris Lytle (USA) def. Matt Serra (USA) by unanimous decision (30–27, 30–27, 30–27)
  - Lightweight bout: Sean Sherk (USA) def. Evan Dunham (USA) by split decision (29–28, 28–29, 29–28)
  - Lightweight bout: Melvin Guillard (USA) def. Jeremy Stephens (USA) by split decision (29–28, 28–29, 30–27)

==== Pitch and putt ====
- EPPA European Championship in Lloret de Mar, Catalonia:
  - 5th-8th places:
    - Switzerland 3–6 **Norway**
    - **Andorra** 9–0 Germany
  - Semifinals:
    - **Ireland** 8–1 Great Britain
    - **Catalonia** 8–1 Netherlands

==== Rugby league ====
- NRL finals series:
  - Preliminary Final: **St. George Illawarra Dragons** 13–12 Wests Tigers

==== Snooker ====
- World Open in Glasgow, Scotland, Quarterfinals:
  - **Mark Williams** (WAL) 3–2 Ding Junhui (CHN)
  - **Peter Ebdon** (ENG) 3–1 Martin Gould (ENG)
  - **Ronnie O'Sullivan** (ENG) 3–1 Stephen Maguire (SCO)
  - Ricky Walden (ENG) 1–3 **Neil Robertson** (AUS)

==== Tennis ====
- WTA Tour:
  - Tashkent Open in Tashkent, Uzbekistan:
    - Final: **Alla Kudryavtseva** (RUS) def. Elena Vesnina (RUS) 6–4, 6–4
      - Kudryavtseva win the first title of her career.

==== Volleyball ====
- Men's World Championship in Italy:
  - Pool A in Milan:
    - Egypt 3–0 Iran
    - Italy 3–0 Japan
  - Pool B in Verona:
    - Brazil 3–0 Tunisia
    - Spain 2–3 Cuba
  - Pool C in Modena:
    - Russia 3–0 Cameroon
    - Australia 1–3 Puerto Rico
  - Pool D in Reggio Calabria:
    - Venezuela 0–3 Argentina
    - United States 3–2 Mexico
  - Pool E in Turin:
    - France 3–2 Czech Republic
    - Bulgaria 3–0 China
  - Pool F in Trieste:
    - Poland 3–0 Canada
    - Germany 0–3 Serbia
- Final Four Women's Cup in Tuxtla Gutiérrez, Chiapas, Mexico:
  - Bronze medal match: Mexico 0–3 (bronze) **Argentina**
  - Final: (silver) Peru 2–3 (gold) **Dominican Republic**
    - Dominican Republic win the title for the first time.
- Asian Women's Cup Championship in Taicang, China:
  - 7th place playoff: **Vietnam** 3–0 Iran
  - 5th place playoff: **Kazakhstan** 3–2 Chinese Taipei
  - 3rd place playoff: Japan 0–3 (bronze) **South Korea**
  - Final: (gold) **China** 3–0 (silver) Thailand
    - China win the title for the second time.

==== Weightlifting ====
- World Championships in Antalya, Turkey:
  - Women's +75 kg:
    - Total: (gold) Tatiana Kashirina (RUS) 315 kg (silver) Meng Suping (CHN) 310 kg (bronze) Jang Mi-Ran (KOR) 309 kg
    - Snatch: (gold) Kashirina 145 kg (WR) (silver) Meng 131 kg (bronze) Jang 130 kg
    - Clean & Jerk: (gold) Meng 179 kg (silver) Jang 179 kg (bronze) Kashirina 170 kg
  - Men's 94 kg:
    - Total: (gold) Alexandr Ivanov (RUS) 403 kg (silver) Artem Ivanov (UKR) 402 kg (bronze) Valeriu Calancea (ROU) 397 kg
    - Snatch: (gold) Ivanov 185 kg (silver) Ivanov 185 kg (bronze) Vladimir Sedov (KAZ) 180 kg
    - Clean & Jerk: (gold) Calancea 220 kg (silver) Ivanov 218 kg (bronze) Andrey Demanov (RUS) 218 kg

=== September 24, 2010 (Friday) ===
==== American football ====
- NCAA:
  - AP Top 10: (4) TCU 41, SMU 24

==== Basketball ====
- FIBA World Championship for Women in the Czech Republic: (teams in **bold** advance to the main round)
  - Group A in Ostrava:
    - China 61–65 **Canada**
    - **Australia** 83–59 **Belarus**
      - Standings (after 2 games): Australia 4 points, Belarus, Canada 3, China 2.
  - Group B in Ostrava:
    - **United States** 108–52 Senegal
    - **France** 69–55 Greece
      - Standings (after 2 games): USA, France 4 points, Greece, Senegal 2.
  - Group C in Brno:
    - **Spain** 84–69 South Korea
    - Brazil 80–73 Mali
      - Standings (after 2 games): Spain 4 points, Korea Republic, Brazil 3, Mali 2.
  - Group D in Brno:
    - Argentina 58–59 **Japan**
    - **Russia** 55–52 **Czech Republic**
      - Standings (after 2 games): Russia 4 points, Japan, Czech Republic 3, Argentina 2.

==== Figure skating ====
- ISU Junior Grand Prix in Karuizawa, Nagano, Japan:
  - Ice Dance – short dance: (1) Ekaterina Pushkash / Jonathan Guerreiro (RUS) 53.91 (2) Alexandra Stepanova / Ivan Bukin (RUS) 53.28 (3) Geraldine Bott / Neil Brown (FRA) 52.02
  - Men – short program: (1) Max Aaron (USA) 66.28 (2) Andrei Rogozine (CAN) 65.03 (3) Abzal Rakimgaliev (KAZ) 61.65
  - Ladies – short program: (1) Risa Shoji (JPN) 51.42 (2) Kiri Baga (USA) 50.09 (3) Angela Wang (USA) 47.61

==== Football (soccer) ====
- WAFF Championship in Amman, Jordan:
  - Group A: Iran 3–0 Bahrain
  - Group B: Jordan 1–1 Syria

==== Gymnastics ====
- World Rhythmic Gymnastics Championships in Moscow, Russia:
  - Individual all-around: (gold) Yevgeniya Kanayeva (RUS) 116.250 (silver) Daria Kondakova (RUS) 113.825 (bronze) Melitina Staniouta (BLR) 110.350

==== Korfball ====
- Europa Cup first round in Wrocław, Poland:
  - Pool A:
    - Vacarisses (Catalonia) 25–5 (Scotland) St Andrews University
    - Trojans (England) 18–7 (Poland) AZS Wrocław
  - Pool B:
    - KV Adler Rauxel (Germany) 9–7 (Hungary) SKK Prievidza Dolphins
    - Bonson FJEP (France) 11–12 (Turkey) Kocaeli University

==== Pitch and putt ====
- EPPA European Championship in Lloret de Mar, Catalonia: (teams in **bold** advance to semifinals)
  - Quarterfinals:
    - **Ireland** 9–0 Germany
    - **Catalonia** 7–2 Switzerland
    - **Netherlands** 7–2 Norway
    - Andorra 4.5–4.5 **Great Britain**

==== Rugby league ====
- NRL finals series:
  - Preliminary Final: Gold Coast Titans 6–32 **Sydney Roosters**

==== Snooker ====
- World Open in Glasgow, Scotland, Last 16:
  - Jamie Cope (ENG) 1–3 **Ricky Walden** (ENG)
  - Stephen Hendry (SCO) 1–3 **Ronnie O'Sullivan** (ENG)
  - **Stephen Maguire** (SCO) 3–0 Alan McManus (SCO)
  - **Neil Robertson** (AUS) 3–2 Andrew Higginson (ENG)
  - Stephen Lee (ENG) 0–3 **Martin Gould** (ENG)

==== Volleyball ====
- Final Four Women's Cup in Tuxtla Gutiérrez, Chiapas, Mexico:
  - Semifinals:
    - **Dominican Republic** 3–0 Argentina
    - **Peru** 3–0 Mexico
- Asian Women's Cup Championship in Taicang, China:
  - 5th–8th semifinals:
    - Vietnam 0–3 **Kazakhstan**
    - Iran 0–3 **Chinese Taipei**
  - Semifinals:
    - **Thailand** 3–2 South Korea
    - **China** 3–0 Japan

==== Weightlifting ====
- World Championships in Antalya, Turkey:
  - Men's 85 kg:
    - Total: (gold) Adrian Zieliński (POL) 383 kg (silver) Aleksey Yufkin (RUS) 380 kg (bronze) Siarhei Lahun (BLR) 377 kg
    - Snatch: (gold) Ara Khachatryan (ARM) 175 kg (silver) Zieliński 173 kg (bronze) Yufkin 172 kg
    - Clean & Jerk: (gold) Lahun 211 kg (silver) Yoelmis Hernández (CUB) 210 kg (bronze) Zieliński 210 kg

=== September 23, 2010 (Thursday) ===
==== Basketball ====
- FIBA World Championship for Women in Czech Republic:
  - Group A in Ostrava:
    - Belarus 68–57 China
    - Canada 47–72 Australia
  - Group B in Ostrava:
    - Greece 73–99 United States
    - Senegal 45–83 France
  - Group C in Brno:
    - South Korea 61–60 Brazil
    - Mali 36–80 Spain
  - Group D in Brno:
    - Japan 63–86 Russia
    - Czech Republic 67–53 Argentina

==== Cricket ====
- ICC Intercontinental Cup in Harare, day 4:
  - Ireland 465 (134.5 overs) and 151/4 (54 overs); Zimbabwe XI 590 (173.2 overs). **Match drawn**.
    - Standings: Afghanistan 77 points (5 matches), Zimbabwe XI 72 (5), Scotland 69 (5), Ireland 55 (6), Kenya 43 (5), Netherlands 15 (6), Canada 9 (6).

==== Football (soccer) ====
- Copa Sudamericana second stage, second leg: (first leg scores in parentheses)
  - **Emelec** (Ecuador) 5–0 (1–2) (Peru) Universidad San Martín. 3–3 on points; Emelec win 6–2 on aggregate.
  - **Unión San Felipe** (Chile) 1–1 (1–1) (Paraguay) Guaraní. 2–2 on points; 2–2 on aggregate; Unión San Felipe win 8–7 on penalty shootout.
  - Caracas (Venezuela) 0–0 (1–2) (Colombia) **Santa Fe**. Santa Fe win 4–1 on points.
- CONCACAF Champions League group stage, matchday 4: (teams in ~~strike~~ are eliminated)
  - Group B: ~~Joe Public~~ (Trinidad and Tobago) 2–3 (Guatemala) Municipal
    - Standings (after 4 matches): (United States) Columbus Crew 9 points, (Mexico) Santos Laguna 7, Municipal 5, Joe Public 1.
  - Group D: Olimpia (Honduras) 2–1 (Mexico) Toluca
    - Standings (after 4 matches): Toluca, Olimpia 7 points, Puerto Rico Islanders 5, (El Salvador) FAS 2.
- (United States) Women's Professional Soccer Super Semifinal in Boston:
  - Boston Breakers 1–2 (a.e.t.) **Philadelphia Independence**

==== Gymnastics ====
- World Rhythmic Gymnastics Championships in Moscow, Russia:
  - Ball: (gold) Yevgeniya Kanayeva (RUS) 28.700 points (silver) Daria Dmitrieva (RUS) 28.650 (bronze) Aliya Garayeva (AZE) 27.550
  - Ribbon: (gold) Dmitrieva 28.825 points (silver) Daria Kondakova (RUS) 28.750 (bronze) Garayeva 26.675
  - Teams: (gold) Russia 284.925 points (silver) Belarus 269.700 (bronze) Azerbaijan 265.225

==== Snooker ====
- World Open in Glasgow, Scotland:
  - Last 32:
    - **Ronnie O'Sullivan** (ENG) 3–1 Jimmy White (ENG)
    - Marco Fu (HKG) 1–3 **Andrew Higginson** (ENG)
  - Last 16:
    - **Ding Junhui** (CHN) 3–0 Marcus Campbell (SCO)
    - **Mark Williams** (WAL) 3–2 Barry Hawkins (ENG)
    - **Peter Ebdon** (ENG) 3–2 Liu Song (CHN)

==== Volleyball ====
- Final Four Women's Cup in Tuxtla Gutiérrez, Chiapas, Mexico:
  - Preliminary Round:
    - Argentina 1–3 Peru
    - Dominican Republic 3–0 Mexico
      - Final standings: Peru 6 points, Dominican Republic 5, Argentina 4, Mexico 3.
- Asian Women's Cup Championship in Taicang, China:
  - Quarterfinals:
    - **Japan** 3–0 Kazakhstan
    - **South Korea** 3–0 Chinese Taipei
    - **Thailand** 3–0 Iran
    - **China** 3–0 Vietnam

==== Weightlifting ====
- World Championships in Antalya, Turkey:
  - Women's 75 kg:
    - Total: (gold) Svetlana Podobedova (KAZ) 295 kg (WR) (silver) Natalya Zabolotnaya (RUS) 293 kg (bronze) Nadezhda Yevstyukhina (RUS) 283 kg
    - Snatch: (gold) Podobedova 134 kg WR (silver) Zabolotnaya 133 kg (bronze) Yevstyukhina 123 kg
    - Clean & Jerk: (gold) Podobedova 161 kg WR (silver) Yevstyukhina 160 kg (bronze) Zabolotnaya 160 kg
  - Men's 77 kg:
    - Total: (gold) Tigran Gevorg Martirosyan (ARM) 373 kg (silver) Lü Xiaojun (CHN) 370 kg (bronze) Tarek Yehia (EGY) 356 kg
    - Snatch: (gold) Martirosyan 173 kg (silver) Lu 170 kg (bronze) Kianoush Rostami (IRN) 161 kg
    - Clean & Jerk: (gold) Lu 200 kg (silver) Martirosyan 200 kg (bronze) Yehia 161 kg

=== September 22, 2010 (Wednesday) ===
==== Cricket ====
- Pakistan in England:
  - 5th ODI in Southampton: England 256/6 (50 overs; Eoin Morgan 107*); Pakistan 135 (37 overs). **England win by 121 runs; win 5-match series 3–2.**
- ICC Intercontinental Cup in Harare, day 3:
  - Ireland 465 (134.5 overs); Zimbabwe XI 506/6 (148 overs; Sean Williams 178, Keith Dabengwa 140). Zimbabwe XI lead by 41 runs with 4 wickets remaining in the 1st innings.

==== Football (soccer) ====
- AFC Champions League quarter-finals, second leg: (first leg scores in parentheses)
  - Pohang Steelers (South Korea) 1–1 (1–2) (Iran) **Zob Ahan**. Zob Ahan win 3–2 on aggregate.
  - Suwon Samsung Bluewings (South Korea) 2–0 (1–4) (South Korea) **Seongnam Ilhwa Chunma**. Seongnam Ilhwa Chunma win 4–3 on aggregate.
  - Al-Gharafa (Qatar) 4–2 (0–3) (Saudi Arabia) **Al-Hilal**. Al-Hilal win 5–4 on aggregate.
  - **Al-Shabab** (Saudi Arabia) 0–1 (2–0) (South Korea) Jeonbuk Hyundai Motors. Al-Shabab win 2–1 on aggregate.
- Copa Sudamericana second stage, second leg: (first leg scores in parentheses)
  - Estudiantes (Argentina) 1–1 (0–1) (Argentina) **Newell's Old Boys**. Newell's Old Boys win 4–1 on points.
  - Sport Huancayo (Peru) 2–0 (0–9) (Uruguay) **Defensor Sporting**. 3–3 on points; Defensor Sporting win 9–2 on aggregate.
  - **San José** (Bolivia) 4–0 (1–1) (Colombia) Atlético Huila. San José win 4–1 on points.
- CONCACAF Champions League group stage, matchday 4:
  - Group A: Árabe Unido (Panama) 2–3 (United States) Real Salt Lake
    - Standings (after 4 matches): Real Salt Lake 9 points, (Mexico) Cruz Azul 7, (Canada) Toronto FC 4, Árabe Unido 3.
  - Group C:
    - Monterrey (Mexico) 3–2 (United States) Seattle Sounders FC
    - Marathón (Honduras) 2–1 (Costa Rica) Saprissa
      - Standings (after 4 matches): Monterrey 12 points, Saprissa, Marathón 6, Seattle Sounders FC 0.
  - Group D: FAS (El Salvador) 0–0 Puerto Rico Islanders
    - Standings: (Mexico) Toluca 7 points (3 matches), Puerto Rico Islanders 5 (4), (Honduras) Olimpia 4 (3), FAS 2 (4).

==== Golf ====
- World Golf Hall of Fame Class of 2011:
  - PGA Tour: Ernie Els (ZAF)
  - Veterans: Doug Ford (USA), Jock Hutchison (SCO)/(USA)
  - Lifetime Achievement: George H. W. Bush (USA)
  - International inductees will be announced in October.

==== Snooker ====
- World Open in Glasgow, Scotland, Last 32:
  - **Neil Robertson** (AUS) 3–1 David Morris (IRL)
  - **Barry Hawkins** (ENG) 3–1 Ken Doherty (IRL)
  - James McBain (SCO) 0–3 **Ricky Walden** (ENG)
  - Judd Trump (ENG) 2–3 **Stephen Maguire** (SCO)
  - **Martin Gould** (ENG) 3–0 Matthew Couch (ENG)

==== Squash ====
- Women's World Open in Sharm El Sheikh, Egypt:
  - Final: (gold) **Nicol David** (MAS) def. (silver) Omneya Abdel Kawy (EGY) 11–5, 11–8, 11–6
    - David wins her fifth world title in six years.

==== Volleyball ====
- Final Four Women's Cup in Tuxtla Gutiérrez, Chiapas, Mexico:
  - Preliminary Round:
    - Argentina 1–3 Dominican Republic
    - Peru 3–0 Mexico

==== Weightlifting ====
- World Championships in Antalya, Turkey:
  - Women's 69 kg:
    - Total: (gold) Svetlana Shimkova (RUS) 256 kg (silver) Kang Yue (CHN) 253 kg (bronze) Meline Daluzyan (ARM) 251 kg
    - Snatch: (gold) Shimkova 116 kg (silver) Kang 113 kg (bronze) Daluzyan 112 kg
    - Clean & Jerk: (gold) Shimkova 140 kg (silver) Kang 140 kg (bronze) Daluzyan 139 kg

=== September 21, 2010 (Tuesday) ===
==== Baseball ====
- Major League Baseball
  - The Minnesota Twins become the first team to clinch a postseason berth with a 6–4 home win over the Cleveland Indians, matched with a Chicago White Sox 7–2 loss to the Oakland Athletics in Oakland to win the American League Central Division championship.

==== Cricket ====
- ICC Intercontinental Cup in Harare, day 2:
  - Ireland 465 (134.5 overs; Andrew White 102, Shingirai Masakadza 5/107); Zimbabwe XI 175/3 (52 overs). Zimbabwe XI trail by 290 runs with 7 wickets remaining in the 1st innings.
- ICC Intercontinental Shield in Windhoek, day 4: (teams in **bold** advance to the final)
  - Uganda 329 (92.1 overs) and 295 (100 overs; Roger Mukasa 121); **Namibia** 609 (179.4 overs) and 16/0 (4 overs). **Namibia win by 10 wickets.**
    - Final standings: Namibia 46 points, **United Arab Emirates** 37, Uganda 29, Bermuda 0.

==== Football (soccer) ====
- FIFA U-17 Women's World Cup in Trinidad and Tobago:
  - Semifinals:
    - **South Korea** 2–1 Spain
    - North Korea 1–2 **Japan**
- Copa Sudamericana second stage, second leg: (first leg scores in parentheses)
  - Cerro Porteño (Paraguay) 2–2 (0–1) (Bolivia) **Universitario**. Universitario win 4–1 on points.
  - **Deportes Tolima** (Colombia) 2–0 (0–1) (Bolivia) Oriente Petrolero. 3–3 on points; Deportes Tolima win 2–1 on aggregate.
- CONCACAF Champions League group stage, matchday 4:
  - Group A: Cruz Azul (Mexico) 0–0 (Canada) Toronto FC
    - Standings: Cruz Azul 7 points (4 matches), (United States) Real Salt Lake 6 (3), Toronto FC 4 (4), (Panama) Árabe Unido 3 (3).
  - Group B: Columbus Crew (United States) 1–0 (Mexico) Santos Laguna
    - Standings: Columbus Crew 9 points (4 matches), Santos Laguna 7 (4), (Guatemala) Municipal 2 (3), (Trinidad and Tobago) Joe Public 1 (3).

==== Gymnastics ====
- World Rhythmic Gymnastics Championships in Moscow, Russia:
  - Rope: (gold) Daria Kondakova (RUS) 28.750 points (silver) Yevgeniya Kanayeva (RUS) 28.600 (bronze) Melitina Staniouta (BLR) 27.650
  - Hoop: (gold) Kanayeva 29.200 points (silver) Kondakova 28.900 (bronze) Aliya Garayeva (AZE) 27.675

==== Snooker ====
- World Open in Glasgow, Scotland, Last 32:
  - Ali Carter (ENG) 1–3 **Mark Williams** (WAL)
  - **Ding Junhui** (CHN) 3–1 Jimmy Michie (ENG)
  - **Stephen Lee** (ENG) 3–2 Nigel Bond (ENG)
  - **Stephen Hendry** (SCO) 3–0 Mark Davis (ENG)
  - **Peter Ebdon** (ENG) 3–2 Fergal O'Brien (IRL)

==== Volleyball ====
- Final Four Women's Cup in Tuxtla Gutiérrez, Chiapas, Mexico:
  - Preliminary Round:
    - Dominican Republic 0–3 Peru
    - Mexico 0–3 Argentina

==== Weightlifting ====
- World Championships in Antalya, Turkey:
  - Men's 69 kg:
    - Total: (gold) Liao Hui (CHN) 358 kg WR (silver) Ninel Miculescu (ROU) 337 kg (bronze) Mete Binay (TUR) 335 kg
    - Snatch: (gold) Binay 160 kg (silver) Liao 160 kg (bronze) Miculescu 157 kg
    - Clean & Jerk: (gold) Liao 198 kg WR (silver) Kim Kum Sok (PRK) 181 kg (bronze) Armen Kazaryan (RUS) 181 kg

=== September 20, 2010 (Monday) ===
==== American football ====
- NFL Monday Night Football Week 2: New Orleans Saints 25, San Francisco 49ers 22

==== Cricket ====
- Pakistan in England:
  - 4th ODI in London: Pakistan 265/7 (50 overs); England 227 (46.1 overs). **Pakistan win by 38 runs; 5-match series level 2–2.**
- ICC Intercontinental Cup in Harare, day 1:
  - Ireland 340/6 (96 overs); Zimbabwe XI.
- ICC Intercontinental Shield in Windhoek, day 3:
  - Uganda 329 (92.1 overs) and 77/2 (22 overs); Namibia 609 (179.4 overs). Uganda trail by 203 runs with 8 wickets remaining.

==== Snooker ====
- World Open in Glasgow, Scotland
  - Round 3: Mark King (ENG) 0–3 **Ronnie O'Sullivan** (ENG)
    - O'Sullivan becomes the first player to compile at least 10 maximum breaks in professional competition.
  - Last 32:
    - Matthew Stevens (WAL) 2–3 **Alan McManus** (SCO)
    - Joe Jogia (ENG) 1–3 **Liu Song** (CHN)
    - **Jamie Cope** (ENG) 3–2 Dave Harold (ENG)
    - Mike Dunn (ENG) 1–3 **Marcus Campbell** (SCO)

==== Tennis ====
- Davis Cup World Group play-offs, day 4:
  - Australia 2–3 **Belgium**
    - Olivier Rochus (BEL) def. Peter Luczak (AUS) 7–6(8), 6–4, 6–7(0), 7–6(2)
    - Ruben Bemelmans (BEL) def. Carsten Ball (AUS) 7–6(4), 6–3, 6–4

==== Weightlifting ====
- World Championships in Antalya, Turkey:
  - Women's 63 kg:
    - Total: (gold) Maiya Maneza (KAZ) 246 kg (silver) Sibel Şimşek (TUR) 241 kg (bronze) Ouyang Xiaofang (CHN) 241 kg
    - Snatch: (gold) Ouyang 112 kg (silver) Şimşek 111 kg (bronze) Kim Soo-Kyung (KOR) 107 kg
    - Clean & Jerk: (gold) Maneza 143 kg WR (silver) Nísida Palomeque (VEN) 134 kg (bronze) O Jong Ae (PRK) 130 kg

=== September 19, 2010 (Sunday) ===
==== American football ====
- NFL Week 2:
  - Pittsburgh Steelers 19, Tennessee Titans 11
  - Miami Dolphins 14, Minnesota Vikings 10
  - Atlanta Falcons 41, Arizona Cardinals 7
  - Cincinnati Bengals 15, Baltimore Ravens 10
  - Kansas City Chiefs 16, Cleveland Browns 14
  - Chicago Bears 27, Dallas Cowboys 20
  - Philadelphia Eagles 35, Detroit Lions 32
  - Green Bay Packers 34, Buffalo Bills 7
  - Tampa Bay Buccaneers 20, Carolina Panthers 7
  - Denver Broncos 31, Seattle Seahawks 14
  - Oakland Raiders 16, St. Louis Rams 14
  - Houston Texans 30, Washington Redskins 27 (OT)
    - The Texans' Matt Schaub and the Redskins' Donovan McNabb become the first pair of quarterbacks to throw for 400 or more yards in the same game since 1994.
  - New York Jets 28, New England Patriots 14
  - San Diego Chargers 38, Jacksonville Jaguars 13
  - Sunday Night Football: Indianapolis Colts 38, New York Giants 14

==== Auto racing ====
- Chase for the Sprint Cup:
  - Sylvania 300 in Loudon, New Hampshire: (1) (Kansas) Clint Bowyer (Chevrolet; Richard Childress Racing) (2) (Virginia) Denny Hamlin (Toyota; Joe Gibbs Racing) (3) (Missouri) Jamie McMurray (Chevrolet; Earnhardt Ganassi Racing)
    - Drivers' championship standings (after 27 of 36 races): (1) Hamlin 5230 points (2) (California) Kevin Harvick (Chevrolet; Richard Childress Racing) 5185 (3) (Nevada) Kyle Busch (Toyota; Joe Gibbs Racing) 5168
    - Bowyer was docked 150 points on September 22 after his team was found to be in violation of three rules, dropping him back to 12th in the Chase standings with 5045 points. (NASCAR)
- IndyCar Series:
  - Indy Japan 300 in Motegi, Japan: (1) Hélio Castroneves (BRA) (Team Penske) (2) Dario Franchitti (GBR) (Chip Ganassi Racing) (3) Will Power (AUS) (Team Penske)
    - Drivers' championship standings (after 16 of 17 races): (1) Power 587 points (2) Franchitti 575 (3) Castroneves 501
- World Touring Car Championship:
  - Race of Spain:
    - Race 17: (1) Gabriele Tarquini (ITA) (SR-Sport; SEAT León) (2) Yvan Muller (FRA) (Chevrolet; Chevrolet Cruze) (3) Rob Huff (GBR) (Chevrolet; Chevrolet Cruze)
    - Race 18: (1) Tiago Monteiro (POR) (SR-Sport; SEAT León) (2) Muller (3) Tarquini
      - Drivers' championship standings (after 18 of 22 races): (1) Muller 265 points (2) Andy Priaulx (GBR) (BMW Team RBM; BMW 320si) 240 (3) Tarquini 236
      - Manufacturers' championship standings: (1) Chevrolet 569 points (2) SEAT Customers Technology 524 (3) BMW 491

==== Badminton ====
- BWF Super Series:
  - China Masters Super Series in Changzhou:
    - Men's singles: **Lin Dan** (CHN) def. Chen Long (CHN) 21–15, 13–21, 21–14
    - Women's singles: **Wang Xin** (CHN) def. Tine Baun (DEN) 21–13, 21–9
    - Men's doubles: **Cai Yun/Fu Haifeng** (CHN) def. Ko Sung Hyun/Yoo Yeon Seong (KOR) 21–14, 21–19
    - Women's doubles: **Wang Xiao Li/Yu Yang** (CHN) def. Bao Yi Xin/Lu Lu (CHN) 21–8, 21–8
    - Mixed doubles: **Tao Jia Ming/Tian Qing** (CHN) def. Xu Chen/Yu Yang (CHN) 21–11, 21–14

==== Cricket ====
- ICC Intercontinental Shield in Windhoek, day 2:
  - Uganda 329 (92.1 overs); Namibia 320/4 (109 overs). Namibia trail by 9 runs with 6 wickets remaining in the 1st innings.

==== Cycling ====
- Grand Tours:
  - Vuelta a España:
    - Stage 21: (gold) Tyler Farrar (USA) (Garmin–Transitions) 2h 02' 24" (silver) Mark Cavendish (GBR) (Team HTC–Columbia) s.t. (bronze) Allan Davis (AUS) (Astana) s.t.
      - Final general classification: (1) Vincenzo Nibali (ITA) (Liquigas–Doimo) 87h 18' 31" (2) Ezequiel Mosquera (ESP) (Xacobeo–Galicia) + 43" (3) Peter Velits (SVK) (Team HTC–Columbia) + 3' 04"
      - UCI World Rankings (after 25 of 26 events): (1) Joaquim Rodríguez (ESP) (Team Katusha) 551 points (2) Alberto Contador (ESP) (Astana) 482 (3) Luis León Sánchez (ESP) (Caisse d'Epargne) 403

==== Equestrianism ====
- Show jumping:
  - FEI Nations Cup Promotional League:
    - Final in Barcelona (CSIO 5*): (gold) Denmark (Andreas Schou on Uno's Safier, Emilie Martinsen on Caballero, Thomas Sandgaard on Rubber Ball, Tina Lund on Zamiro) (silver) Spain (Alfredo Fernandez Duran on Gold Digger, Cristina Toda on Cashmire, Natalia Golding on Just Cruising, Jesus Garmendia Echevarria on Moon Mail) (bronze) Canada (Jenna Thompson on Zeke, Yann Candele on Atlete van't Heike, Keean White on Celena Z, Ian Millar on Star Power)
      - Denmark qualify for the 2011 Meydan FEI Nations Cup.
  - FEI World Cup North American League – East Coast:
    - 6th competition in Moreland Hills, Ohio (CSI 2*-W): (gold) Beezie Madden (USA) on Coral Reef Via Volo (silver) Brianne Goutal (USA) on Onira (bronze) Margie Engle (USA) on Indigo
  - CHI Donaueschingen (CSI 3*):
    - S.D. Fürst Joachim zu Fürstenberg-Gedächtnispreis (Grand Prix): (gold) Steve Guerdat (SUI) on Jalisca Solier (silver) Rolf-Göran Bengtsson (SWE) on Quintero (bronze) Thomas Mühlbauer (GER) on Asti Spumante
- Dressage:
  - CHI Donaueschingen (CDI 4*):
    - Grand Prix Spécial: (gold) Victoria Max-Theurer (AUT) on Augustin OLD (silver) Anky van Grunsven (NED) on Painted Black (bronze) Sabine Becker (GER) on Lamarc WRT

==== Football (soccer) ====
- CAF Champions League group stage, matchday 6: (teams in **bold** advance to the semifinals)
  - Group B:
    - Heartland (Nigeria) 1–1 (Algeria) **JS Kabylie**
    - Ismaily (Egypt) 4–2 (Egypt) **Al-Ahly**
      - Final standings: JS Kabylie 14 points, Al-Ahly 8, Ismaily 6, Heartland 5.
- CAF Confederation Cup group stage, matchday 4:
  - Group A: Djoliba (Mali) 2–0 (Sudan) Al-Hilal
    - Standings (after 4 matches): Al-Hilal, (Libya) Ittihad 9 points, Djoliba 4, (Niger) ASFAN 1.
  - Group B: Haras El Hodood (Egypt) 1–2 (Morocco) FUS Rabat
    - Standings (after 4 matches): FUS Rabat 9 points, (Tunisia) CS Sfaxien 7, (Zambia) Zanaco 4, Haras El Hodood 2.
- (United States) Women's Professional Soccer playoffs – first round in West Chester, Pennsylvania:
  - **Philadelphia Independence** 1–0 (a.e.t.) Washington Freedom

==== Gaelic football ====
- All-Ireland Senior Championship Final in Dublin:
  - **Cork** **0-16**–0-15 Down
    - Cork win their seventh All-Ireland football title, and first since 1990.

==== Golf ====
- European Tour:
  - Austrian Golf Open in Oberwaltersdorf, Austria
    - Winner: José Manuel Lara (ESP) 271 (−17)^{PO}
      - Lara claims his second career European Tour title in a playoff with David Lynn (ENG).

==== Motorcycle racing ====
- Moto GP:
  - Aragon motorcycle Grand Prix in Alcañiz, Spain:
    - MotoGP: (1) Casey Stoner (AUS) (Ducati) (2) Dani Pedrosa (ESP) (Honda) (3) Nicky Hayden (USA) (Ducati)
      - Riders' championship standings (after 13 of 18 rounds): (1) Jorge Lorenzo (ESP) (Yamaha) 284 points (2) Pedrosa 228 (3) Stoner 155
      - Manufacturers' championship standings: (1) Yamaha 293 points (2) Honda 265 (3) Ducati 195
    - Moto2: (1) Andrea Iannone (ITA) (Speed Up) (2) Julián Simón (ESP) (Suter) (3) Gábor Talmácsi (HUN) (Speed Up)
      - Riders' championship standings (after 12 of 17 rounds): (1) Toni Elías (ESP) (Moriwaki) 224 points (2) Simón 148 (3) Iannone 144
      - Manufacturers' championship standings: (1) Moriwaki 249 points (2) Suter 216 (3) Speed Up 169
    - 125cc: (1) Pol Espargaró (ESP) (Derbi) (2) Nicolás Terol (ESP) (Aprilia) (3) Bradley Smith (GBR) (Aprilia)
      - Riders' championship standings (after 12 of 17 rounds): (1) Terol 208 points (2) Espargaró 202 (3) Marc Márquez (ESP) (Derbi)
      - Manufacturers' championship standings: (1) Derbi 285 points (2) Aprilia 251 (3) Honda 17

==== Table tennis ====
- European Championships in Ostrava, Czech Republic:
  - Men's singles final: (gold) Timo Boll (GER) def. (silver) Patrick Baum (GER) 4–0
    - Boll wins the title for the fourth time.
  - Women's singles final: (gold) Viktoria Pavlovich (BLR) def. (silver) Liu Jia (AUT) 4–3
  - Women's doubles final: (gold) Rūta Paškauskienė (LTU)/Oksana Fadeyeva (RUS) def. (silver) Li Jie (NED)/Elena Timina (NED) 4–0

==== Tennis ====
- Davis Cup World Group Semifinals, day 3: (teams in **bold** advance to the 2010 final)
  - **France** 5–0 Argentina
    - Gilles Simon (FRA) def. Eduardo Schwank (ARG) 7–6(5), 6–7(6), 6–3
    - Arnaud Clément (FRA) def. Horacio Zeballos (ARG) 7–5, 6–1
  - **Serbia** 3–2 Czech Republic
    - Novak Djokovic (SRB) def. Tomáš Berdych (CZE) 4–6, 6–3, 6–2, 6–4
    - Janko Tipsarević (SRB) def. Radek Štěpánek (CZE) 6–0, 7–6(6), 6–4
      - Serbia reach the final for the first time.
- Davis Cup World Group play-offs, day 3: (teams in **bold** advance to the 2011 World Group)
  - Israel 2–3 **Austria**
    - Jürgen Melzer (AUT) def. Dudi Sela (ISR) 6–4, 6–0, 6–3
    - Martin Fischer (AUT) def. Harel Levy (ISR) 2–6, 6–3, 6–0, 6–3
  - Colombia 1–3 **United States**
    - Mardy Fish (USA) def. Santiago Giraldo (COL) 3–6, 6–3, 7–5, 4–6, 8–6
    - Carlos Salamanca (COL) vs. Ryan Harrison (USA) not played
  - **Germany** 5–0 South Africa
    - Andreas Beck (GER) def. Izak van der Merwe (RSA) 7–5, 6–2
    - Florian Mayer (GER) def. Rik de Voest (RSA) 6–3, 6–7(8), 6–2
  - **Sweden** 3–2 Italy
    - Robin Söderling (SWE) def. Simone Bolelli (ITA) 6–3, 6–3, 6–3
    - Fabio Fognini (ITA) def. Andreas Vinciguerra (SWE) 6–1, 6–3
  - **India** 3–2 Brazil
    - Somdev Devvarman (IND) def. Thomaz Bellucci (BRA) 7–6(3), 4–0 retired
    - Rohan Bopanna (IND) def. Ricardo Mello (BRA) 6–3, 7–6(2), 6–3
  - Australia 2–1 Belgium
    - Peter Luczak (AUS) vs. Olivier Rochus (BEL) 4–4 (match suspended)
  - **Kazakhstan** 5–0 Switzerland
    - Andrey Golubev (KAZ) def. Michael Lammer (SUI) 6–3, 6–2
    - Mikhail Kukushkin (KAZ) def. Marco Chiudinelli (SUI) 6–2, 6–4
  - **Romania** 5–0 Ecuador
    - Victor Crivoi (ROU) def. Giovanni Lapentti (ECU) 6–2, 6–4
    - Adrian Ungur (ROU) def. Emilio Gómez (ECU) 6–3, 6–4
- WTA Tour:
  - Guangzhou International Women's Open:
    - Final: **Jarmila Groth** (AUS) def. Alla Kudryavtseva (RUS) 6–1, 6–4
      - Groth wins the first WTA title of her career.
  - Bell Challenge:
    - Final: **Tamira Paszek** (AUT) def. Bethanie Mattek-Sands (USA) 7–6(6), 2–6, 7–5
      - Paszek wins her first WTA title of the season and the second of her career.

==== Weightlifting ====
- World Championships in Antalya, Turkey:
  - Women's 58 kg:
    - Total: (gold) Deng Wei (CHN) 237 kg (silver) Nastassia Novikava (BLR) 233 kg (bronze) Jong Chun Mi (PRK) 230 kg
    - Snatch: (gold) Pak Hyon Suk (PRK) 103 kg (silver) Novikava 103 kg (bronze) Deng 102 kg
    - Clean & Jerk: (gold) Deng 135 kg (silver) Jong 130 kg (bronze) Novikava 130 kg
  - Men's 62 kg:
    - Total: (gold) Kim Un Guk (PRK) 320 kg (silver) Zhang Jie (CHN) 315 kg (bronze) Erol Bilgin (TUR) 314 kg
    - Snatch: (gold) Kim 147 kg (silver) Bilgin 143 kg (bronze) Ding Jianjun (CHN) 142 kg
    - Clean & Jerk: (gold) Zhang 174 kg (silver) Kim 173 kg (bronze) Eko Yuli Irawan (INA) 172 kg

=== September 18, 2010 (Saturday) ===
==== American football ====
- NCAA:
  - AP Top 10:
    - (1) Alabama 62, Duke 13
    - (2) Ohio State 43, Ohio 7
    - (3) Boise State 51, Wyoming 6
    - (4) TCU 45, Baylor 10
    - (5) Oregon 69, Portland State 0
    - (6) Texas 24, Texas Tech 14
    - (7) Oklahoma 27, Air Force 24
    - (8) Nebraska 56, Washington 21
    - (24) Arizona 34, (9) Iowa 27
    - (10) Florida 31, Tennessee 17
  - Other games: UCLA 31, (23) Houston 13

==== Australian rules football ====
- AFL finals series:
  - Second Preliminary Final in Melbourne: **St Kilda** 13.10 (88)–8.16 (64) Western Bulldogs

==== Cricket ====
- ICC Intercontinental Shield in Windhoek, day 1:
  - Uganda 329 (92.1 overs; Laurence Sematimba 106, Craig Williams 5/90); Namibia.
- Clydesdale Bank 40 Final in London:
  - Somerset 199 (39 overs; Imran Tahir 5/41); Warwickshire 200/7 (39 overs; Ian Bell 107). **Warwickshire win by 3 wickets.**

==== Cycling ====
- Grand Tours:
  - Vuelta a España:
    - Stage 20: (gold) Ezequiel Mosquera (ESP) (Xacobeo–Galicia) 4h 45' 28" (silver) Vincenzo Nibali (ITA) (Liquigas–Doimo) + 1" (bronze) Joaquim Rodríguez (ESP) (Team Katusha) + 23"
      - General classification: (1) Nibali 85h 16' 05" (2) Mosquera + 41" (3) Peter Velits (SVK) (Team HTC–Columbia) + 3' 02"

==== Figure skating ====
- ISU Junior Grand Prix in Graz, Austria:
  - Men: (gold) Yan Han (CHN) 170.48 (silver) Artem Grigoriev (RUS) 166.04 (bronze) Zhan Bush (RUS) 164.56
    - Standings (after 3 of 7 events): Keegan Messing (USA), Andrei Rogozine (CAN), Yan 15 points (1 event), Thomas Sosniak (FRA) 14 (2), Jason Brown (USA), Joshua Farris (USA), Grigoriev 13 (1), Max Aaron (USA), Keiji Tanaka (JPN), Bush 11 (1).
  - Ladies: (gold) Adelina Sotnikova (RUS) 178.97 (silver) Christina Gao (USA) 167.14 (bronze) Li Zijun (CHN) 144.76
    - Standings (after 3 of 7 events): Rosa Sheveleva (RUS) 16 points (2 events), Sotnikova, Polina Shelepen (RUS), Elizaveta Tuktamysheva (RUS) 15 (1), Gao, Yasmin Siraj (USA), Kristiene Gong (USA) 13 (1), Li, Shion Kokubun (JPN) 11 (1).

==== Football (soccer) ====
- CAF Champions League group stage, matchday 6: (teams in **bold** advance to the semifinals)
  - Group A:
    - Dynamos (Zimbabwe) 0–1 (Tunisia) **Espérance ST**
    - ES Sétif (Algeria) 0–0 (Democratic Republic of the Congo) **TP Mazembe**
      - Final standings: Espérance ST 13 points, TP Mazembe 11, ES Sétif 6, Dynamos 3.
- CAF Confederation Cup group stage, matchday 4:
  - Group A: ASFAN (Niger) 1–3 (Libya) Ittihad
    - Standings: (Sudan) Al-Hilal 9 points (3 matches), Ittihad 9 (4), ASFAN 1 (4), (Mali) Djoliba 1 (3).

==== Rugby league ====
- NRL finals series:
  - Semi-final: **Sydney Roosters** 34–12 Penrith Panthers

==== Table tennis ====
- European Championships in Ostrava, Czech Republic:
  - Men's doubles final: (gold) Timo Boll/Christian Süss (GER) def. (silver) Kasper Sternberg/Jonathan Groth (DEN) 4–0
    - Boll and Süss win the title for the fourth successive time.

==== Tennis ====
- Davis Cup World Group Semifinals, day 2: (teams in **bold** advance to the 2010 final)
  - **France** 3–0 Argentina
    - Arnaud Clément/Michaël Llodra (FRA) def. Eduardo Schwank/Horacio Zeballos (ARG) 6–4, 7–5, 6–3
      - France reach the final for the first time since 2002.
  - Serbia 1–2 Czech Republic
    - Tomáš Berdych/Radek Štěpánek (CZE) def. Novak Djokovic/Nenad Zimonjić (SRB) 3–6, 6–1, 6–4, 6–1
- Davis Cup World Group play-offs, day 2: (teams in **bold** advance to the 2011 World Group)
  - Colombia 1–2 United States
    - Mardy Fish/John Isner (USA) def. Robert Farah/Carlos Salamanca (COL) 6–4, 6–4, 6–7(5), 6–3
  - **Germany** 3–0 South Africa
    - Andreas Beck/Christopher Kas (GER) def. Rik de Voest/Wesley Moodie (RSA) 6–4, 3–6, 6–3, 6–4
  - Sweden 2–1 Italy
    - Simon Aspelin/Robert Lindstedt (SWE) def. Simone Bolelli/Potito Starace (ITA) 5–7, 6–7(0), 7–6(4), 6–3, 7–5
  - India 1–2 Brazil
    - Mahesh Bhupathi/Leander Paes (IND) def. Marcelo Melo/Bruno Soares (BRA) 6–4, 7–6(5), 6–1
  - Australia 2–1 Belgium
    - Paul Hanley/Lleyton Hewitt (AUS) def. Ruben Bemelmans/Olivier Rochus (BEL) 6–1, 6–2, 6–4
  - **Kazakhstan** 3–0 Switzerland
    - Andrey Golubev/Yuri Schukin (KAZ) def. Yves Allegro/Stanislas Wawrinka (SUI) 6–4, 6–3, 6–3
      - Kazakhstan advance to the World Group for the first time.
  - **Romania** 3–0 Ecuador
    - Victor Hănescu/Horia Tecău (ROU) vs. Iván Endara/Giovanni Lapentti (ECU) 6–2, 6–2, 6–2

==== Weightlifting ====
- World Championships in Antalya, Turkey:
  - Women's 53 kg:
    - Total: (gold) Chen Xiaoting (CHN) 222 kg (silver) Aylin Daşdelen (TUR) 211 kg (bronze) Yudelquis Contreras (DOM) 206 kg
    - Snatch: (gold) Chen 100 kg (silver) Maridalin 93 kg (bronze) Daşdelen 90 kg
    - Clean & Jerk: (gold) Chen 122 kg (silver) Daşdelen 121 kg (bronze) Hiromi Miyake (JPN) 113 kg
  - Men's 56 kg:
    - Total: (gold) Wu Jingbiao (CHN) 292 kg (silver) Long Qingquan (CHN) 288 kg (bronze) Cha Kum Chol (PRK) 280 kg
    - Snatch: (gold) Wu 132 kg (silver) Cha 130 kg (bronze) Long 127 kg
    - Clean & Jerk: (gold) Long 161 kg (silver) Wu 160 kg (bronze) Carlos Berna (COL) 152 kg

=== September 17, 2010 (Friday) ===
==== Australian rules football ====
- AFL finals series:
  - First Preliminary Final in Melbourne: **Collingwood** 18.12 (120)–11.13 (79) Geelong

==== Baseball ====
- Major League Baseball news: Joe Torre announces he will step down as manager of the Los Angeles Dodgers at the end of this season. Dodgers first-base coach and former New York Yankees star Don Mattingly has been named as his replacement. (ESPN)

==== Cricket ====
- Pakistan in England:
  - 3rd ODI in London: Pakistan 241 (49.4 overs); England 218 (45.4 overs; Umar Gul 6/42). **Pakistan win by 23 runs; England lead 5-match series 2–1.**

==== Cycling ====
- Grand Tours:
  - Vuelta a España:
    - Stage 19: (gold) Philippe Gilbert (BEL) (Omega Pharma–Lotto) 5h 43' 41" (silver) Tyler Farrar (USA) (Garmin–Transitions) s.t. (bronze) Filippo Pozzato (ITA) (Team Katusha) + 1"
      - General classification: (1) Vincenzo Nibali (ITA) (Liquigas–Doimo) 80h 30' 48" (2) Ezequiel Mosquera (ESP) (Xacobeo–Galicia) + 50" (3) Peter Velits (SVK) (Team HTC–Columbia) + 1' 59"

==== Figure skating ====
- ISU Junior Grand Prix in Graz, Austria:
  - Ice Dance: (gold) Charlotte Lichtman / Dean Copley (USA) 129.96 (silver) Victoria Sinitsina / Ruslan Zhiganshin (RUS) 126.62 (bronze) Gabriella Papadakis / Guillaume Cizeron (FRA) 115.14
    - Standings (after 3 of 7 events): Papadakis / Cizeron 20 points (2 events), Ksenia Monko / Kirill Khaliavin (RUS), Lichtman / Copely, Alexandra Stepanova / Ivan Bukin (RUS) 15 (1), Sinitsina / Zhiganshin, Anastasia Galyeta / Alexei Shumski (UKR), Anastasia Cannuscio / Colin McManus (USA) 13 (1), Lauri Bonacorsi / Travis Mager (USA), Evgenia Kosigina / Nikolai Moroshkin (RUS) 11 (1).
  - Pairs: (gold) Ksenia Stolbova / Fedor Klimov (RUS) 159.79 (silver) Sui Wenjing / Han Cong (CHN) 145.67 (bronze) Yu Xiaoyu / Jin Yang (CHN) 135.04
  - Ladies – short program: (1) Adelina Sotnikova (RUS) 61.32 (2) Christina Gao (USA) 58.07 (3) Polina Agafonova (RUS) 51.50

==== Football (soccer) ====
- FIFA U-17 Women's World Cup in Trinidad and Tobago:
  - Quarterfinals:
    - **Spain** 2–1 Brazil
    - **Japan** 2–1 Republic of Ireland
- CAF Confederation Cup group stage, matchday 4:
  - Group B: CS Sfaxien (Tunisia) 2–1 (Zambia) Zanaco
    - Standings: CS Sfaxien 7 points (4 matches), (Morocco) FUS Rabat 6 (3), Zanaco 4 (4), (Egypt) Haras El Hodood 2 (3).

==== Rugby league ====
- NRL finals series:
  - Semi-final: Canberra Raiders 24–26 **Wests Tigers**

==== Tennis ====
- Davis Cup World Group Semifinals, day 1:
  - France 2–0 Argentina
    - Michaël Llodra (FRA) def. Juan Mónaco (ARG) 7–5, 4–6, 7–5, 6–3
    - Gaël Monfils (FRA) def. David Nalbandian (ARG) 6–4, 2–6, 6–4, 6–3
  - Serbia 1–1 Czech Republic
    - Radek Štěpánek (CZE) def. Viktor Troicki (SRB) 4–6, 6–2, 6–4, 6–4
    - Janko Tipsarević (SRB) def. Tomáš Berdych (CZE) 7–5, 6–2, 2–6, 7–6(5)
- Davis Cup World Group play-offs, day 2:
  - Israel 2–1 Austria
    - Jonathan Erlich/Andy Ram (ISR) def. Jürgen Melzer/Alexander Peya (AUT) 7–6(2), 6–4, 6–4
- Davis Cup World Group play-offs, day 1:
  - Colombia 1–1 United States
    - Mardy Fish (USA) def. Alejandro Falla (COL) 4–6, 6–1, 6–4, 3–6, 6–4
    - Santiago Giraldo (COL) def. Sam Querrey (USA) 6–2, 6–4, 7–5
  - Germany 2–0 South Africa
    - Philipp Kohlschreiber (GER) def. Rik de Voest (RSA) 6–4, 6–4, 6–4
    - Florian Mayer (GER) def. Izak van der Merwe (RSA) 6–3, 3–6, 6–1, 7–6(6)
  - Sweden 1–1 Italy
    - Potito Starace (ITA) def. Andreas Vinciguerra (SWE) 6–2, 6–2, 6–2
    - Robin Söderling (SWE) def. Fabio Fognini (ITA) 6–1, 6–3, 6–2
  - India 0–2 Brazil
    - Thomaz Bellucci (BRA) def. Rohan Bopanna (IND) 6–7(2), 7–6(7), 7–5, 4–6, 10–8
    - Ricardo Mello (BRA) def. Somdev Devvarman (IND) 4–6, 6–2, 6–7(3), 6–2, 6–4
  - Australia 1–1 Belgium
    - Lleyton Hewitt (AUS) def. Ruben Bemelmans (BEL) 7–6(4), 7–5, 2–6, 6–4
    - Olivier Rochus (BEL) def. Carsten Ball (AUS) 6–4, 6–4, 7–6(5)
  - Kazakhstan 2–0 Switzerland
    - Andrey Golubev (KAZ) def. Marco Chiudinelli (SUI) 6–4, 6–4, 6–4
    - Mikhail Kukushkin (KAZ) def. Stanislas Wawrinka (SUI) 3–6, 6–1, 6–4, 1–6, 6–3
  - Romania 2–0 Ecuador
    - Victor Hănescu (ROU) def. Iván Endara (ECU) 6–2, 6–2, 6–2
    - Adrian Ungur (ROU) def. Giovanni Lapentti (ECU) 6–7(2), 4–6, 6–3, 6–4, 6–1

==== Weightlifting ====
- World Championships in Antalya, Turkey:
  - Women's 48 kg:
    - Total: (gold) Nurcan Taylan (TUR) 214 kg (silver) Sibel Özkan (TUR) 205 kg (bronze) Tian Yuan (CHN) 204 kg
    - Snatch: (gold) Taylan 93 kg (silver) Özkan 90 kg (bronze) Tian 88 kg
    - Clean & Jerk: (gold) Taylan 121 kg (WR) (silver) Tian 116 kg (bronze) Özkan 115 kg

=== September 16, 2010 (Thursday) ===
==== Basketball ====
- WNBA Playoffs:
  - WNBA Finals, Game 3: Seattle Storm 87, Atlanta Dream 84. **Storm win series 3–0.**
    - The Storm win their second WNBA title. Storm center and season MVP Lauren Jackson is named Finals MVP, becoming the first non-U.S. player ever to win the latter award.

==== Cricket ====
- (England) (Wales) County Championship:
  - Division One:
    - Durham 286 (89.5 overs) and 320 (110.4 overs; Michael Di Venuto 129); Somerset 426 (100.1 overs; James Hildreth 105) and 48/3 (12 overs). **Match drawn**.
    - Nottinghamshire 400/9d (89.4 overs; Adam Voges 126, Simon Kerrigan 5/80); Lancashire 11/3 (4.4 overs). **Match drawn**.
    - Yorkshire 261 (76.3 overs; Dewald Nel 6/62) and 130 (29.5 overs; James Tredwell 7/22); Kent 302 (81.5 overs; Alex Blake 105*, Moin Ashraf 5/32) and 90/6 (24.5 overs). **Kent win by 4 wickets**.
      - Final standings: Nottinghamshire, Somerset 214 points, Yorkshire 203.
      - Nottinghamshire win the title for the sixth time, winning seven games to Somerset's six.

==== Cycling ====
- Grand Tours:
  - Vuelta a España:
    - Stage 18: (gold) Mark Cavendish (GBR) (Team HTC–Columbia) 3h 27' 11" (silver) Juan José Haedo (ARG) (Team Saxo Bank) s.t. (bronze) Manuel Antonio Cardoso (POR) (Footon–Servetto–Fuji) s.t.
      - General classification: (1) Vincenzo Nibali (ITA) (Liquigas–Doimo) 74h 47' 06" (2) Ezequiel Mosquera (ESP) (Xacobeo–Galicia) + 38" (3) Peter Velits (SVK) (Team HTC–Columbia) + 1' 59"

==== Figure skating ====
- ISU Junior Grand Prix in Graz, Austria:
  - Ice Dance – short dance: (1) Charlotte Lichtman / Dean Copley (USA) 53.38 (2) Victoria Sinitsina / Ruslan Zhiganshin (RUS) 50.46 (3) Gabriella Papadakis / Guillaume Cizeron (FRA) 49.93
  - Pairs – short program: (1) Ksenia Stolbova / Fedor Klimov (RUS) 54.30 (2) Sui Wenjing / Han Cong (CHN) 51.87 (3) Yu Xiaoyu / Jin Yang (CHN) 47.03
  - Men – short program: (1) Artem Grigoriev (RUS) 63.44 (2) Fumiya Itai (JPN) 59.03 (3) Zhan Bush (RUS) 54.64

==== Football (soccer) ====
- 2011 FIFA Women's World Cup qualification (UEFA):
  - Play-offs, second leg: (first leg in parentheses, winners qualify for 2011 FIFA Women's World Cup)
    - Denmark 2–2 (a.e.t.) (1–2) **Sweden**. Sweden win 4–3 on aggregate.
      - Sweden qualify for the World Cup for the sixth straight time.
    - Switzerland 2–3 (0–2) **England**. England win 5–2 on aggregate.
      - England qualify for the World Cup for the third time.
- FIFA U-17 Women's World Cup in Trinidad and Tobago:
  - Quarterfinals:
    - Nigeria 5–6 (a.e.t.) **South Korea**
    - Germany 0–1 **North Korea**
- UEFA Europa League group stage, matchday 1:
  - Group A:
    - Red Bull Salzburg (Austria) 0–2 (England) Manchester City
    - Juventus (Italy) 3–3 (Poland) Lech Poznań
  - Group B:
    - Aris (Greece) 1–0 (Spain) Atlético Madrid
    - Bayer Leverkusen (Germany) 4–0 (Norway) Rosenborg
  - Group C:
    - Lille (France) 1–2 (Portugal) Sporting CP
    - Levski Sofia (Bulgaria) 3–2 (Belgium) Gent
  - Group D:
    - Dinamo Zagreb (Croatia) 2–0 (Spain) Villarreal
    - Club Brugge (Belgium) 1–1 (Greece) PAOK
  - Group E:
    - AZ (Netherlands) 2–1 (Moldova) Sheriff Tiraspol
    - Dynamo Kyiv (Ukraine) 2–2 (Belarus) BATE
  - Group F:
    - Sparta Prague (Czech Republic) 3–2 (Italy) Palermo
    - Lausanne-Sport (Switzerland) 0–3 (Russia) CSKA Moscow
  - Group G:
    - Anderlecht (Belgium) 1–3 (Russia) Zenit St. Petersburg
    - AEK Athens (Greece) 3–1 (Croatia) Hajduk Split
  - Group H:
    - Stuttgart (Germany) 3–0 (Switzerland) Young Boys
    - Getafe (Spain) 2–1 (Denmark) Odense
  - Group I:
    - Debrecen (Hungary) 0–5 (Ukraine) Metalist Kharkiv
    - PSV Eindhoven (Netherlands) 1–1 (Italy) Sampdoria
  - Group J:
    - Karpaty Lviv (Ukraine) 3–4 (Germany) Borussia Dortmund
    - Sevilla (Spain) 0–1 (France) Paris Saint-Germain
  - Group K:
    - Napoli (Italy) 0–0 (Netherlands) Utrecht
    - Liverpool (England) 4–1 (Romania) Steaua București
  - Group L:
    - Beşiktaş (Turkey) 1–0 (Bulgaria) CSKA Sofia
    - Porto (Portugal) 3–0 (Austria) Rapid Wien
- Copa Sudamericana second stage, first leg:
  - Newell's Old Boys (Argentina) 1–0 (Argentina) Estudiantes
  - Defensor Sporting (Uruguay) 9–0 (Peru) Sport Huancayo
  - Santa Fe (Colombia) 2–1 (Venezuela) Caracas
- CONCACAF Champions League group stage, matchday 3:
  - Group D: Olimpia (Honduras) 2–0 (El Salvador) FAS
    - Standings (after 3 matches): (Mexico) Toluca 7 points, Puerto Rico Islanders, Olimpia 4, FAS 1.

==== Snooker ====
- Premier League Snooker – League phase in Plymouth:
  - Mark Selby (ENG) 2–4 Mark Williams (WAL)
  - Ronnie O'Sullivan (ENG) 3–3 Ding Junhui (CHN)
    - Standings: O'Sullivan 2 points (2 matches), Shaun Murphy (ENG), Williams 2 (1), Ding 1 (2), Marco Fu (HKG) 1 (1), Selby 0 (1), Neil Robertson (AUS) 0 (0).

==== Tennis ====
- Davis Cup World Group play-offs, day 1:
  - Israel 1–1 Austria
    - Dudi Sela (ISR) def. Andreas Haider-Maurer (AUT) 6–4, 6–1, 6–3
    - Jürgen Melzer (AUT) def. Harel Levy (ISR) 6–4, 6–3, 6–3

=== September 15, 2010 (Wednesday) ===
==== Cycling ====
- Grand Tours:
  - Vuelta a España:
    - Stage 17: (gold) Peter Velits (SVK) (Team HTC–Columbia) 52' 43" (silver) Denis Menchov (RUS) (Rabobank) + 12" (bronze) Fabian Cancellara (SUI) (Team Saxo Bank) + 37"
      - General classification: (1) Vincenzo Nibali (ITA) (Liquigas–Doimo) 71h 19' 50" (2) Ezequiel Mosquera (ESP) (Xacobeo–Galicia) + 38" (3) Velits + 1' 59"

==== Football (soccer) ====
- 2011 FIFA Women's World Cup qualification (UEFA):
  - Play-offs, second leg: (first leg in parentheses, winners qualify for 2011 FIFA Women's World Cup)
    - Italy 2–3 (0–0) **France**. France win 3–2 on aggregate.
      - France qualify for the World Cup for the second time.
    - **Norway** 2–0 (1–0) Ukraine. Norway win 3–0 on aggregate.
      - Norway qualify for the World Cup for the sixth successive time.
- UEFA Champions League group stage, matchday 1:
  - Group E:
    - Bayern Munich (Germany) 2–0 (Italy) Roma
    - CFR Cluj (Romania) 2–1 (Switzerland) Basel
  - Group F:
    - Marseille (France) 0–1 (Russia) Spartak Moscow
    - Žilina (Slovakia) 1–4 (England) Chelsea
  - Group G:
    - Real Madrid (Spain) 2–0 (Netherlands) Ajax
    - Milan (Italy) 2–0 (France) Auxerre
  - Group H:
    - Arsenal (England) 6–0 (Portugal) Braga
    - Shakhtar Donetsk (Ukraine) 1–0 (Serbia) Partizan
- AFC Champions League quarter-finals, first leg:
  - Jeonbuk Hyundai Motors (South Korea) 0–2 (Saudi Arabia) Al-Shabab
  - Seongnam Ilhwa Chunma (South Korea) 4–1 (South Korea) Suwon Samsung Bluewings
  - Zob Ahan (Iran) 2–1 (South Korea) Pohang Steelers
  - Al-Hilal (Saudi Arabia) 3–0 (Qatar) Al-Gharafa
- Copa Sudamericana second stage, first leg:
  - Universidad San Martín (Peru) 2–1 (Ecuador) Emelec
- Copa Sudamericana second stage, second leg: (first leg scores in parentheses)
  - **Banfield** (Argentina) 1–1 (1–0) (Argentina) Vélez Sársfield. Banfield win 4–1 on points.
- CONCACAF Champions League group stage, matchday 3:
  - Group A:
    - Árabe Unido (Panama) 0–6 (Mexico) Cruz Azul
    - Real Salt Lake (United States) 4–1 (Canada) Toronto FC
      - Standings (after 3 matches): Cruz Azul, Real Salt Lake 6 points, Toronto FC, Árabe Unido 3.
  - Group D: Toluca (Mexico) 3–0 Puerto Rico Islanders
    - Standings: Toluca 7 points (3 matches), Puerto Rico Islanders 4 (3), (El Salvador) FAS, (Honduras) Olimpia 1 (2).

==== Table tennis ====
- European Championships in Ostrava, Czech Republic:
  - Men's team final: (gold) **Germany** 3–0 (silver) Belarus
    - Germany win the title for the fourth successive time.
  - Women's team final: (gold) **Netherlands** 3–1 (silver) Romania
    - The Netherlands win the title for the third successive time.

=== September 14, 2010 (Tuesday) ===
==== American football ====
- After his involvement in a scandal that led to severe sanctions on the USC football program, Reggie Bush announces that he will forfeit his 2005 Heisman Trophy. (ESPN)

==== Basketball ====
- WNBA Playoffs:
  - WNBA Finals, Game 2: Seattle Storm 87, Atlanta Dream 84. Storm lead series 2–0.

==== Football (soccer) ====
- UEFA Champions League group stage, matchday 1:
  - Group A:
    - Twente (Netherlands) 2–2 (Italy) Internazionale
    - Werder Bremen (Germany) 2–2 (England) Tottenham Hotspur
  - Group B:
    - Lyon (France) 1–0 (Germany) Schalke 04
    - Benfica (Portugal) 2–0 (Israel) Hapoel Tel Aviv
  - Group C:
    - Manchester United (England) 0–0 (Scotland) Rangers
    - Bursaspor (Turkey) 0–4 (Spain) Valencia
  - Group D:
    - Barcelona (Spain) 5–1 (Greece) Panathinaikos
    - Copenhagen (Denmark) 1–0 (Russia) Rubin Kazan
- Copa Sudamericana second stage, first leg:
  - Oriente Petrolero (Bolivia) 1–0 (Colombia) Deportes Tolima
- Copa Sudamericana second stage, second leg: (first leg scores in parentheses)
  - **Peñarol** (Uruguay) 2–1 (1–0) (Ecuador) Barcelona. Peñarol win 6–0 on points.
- CONCACAF Champions League group stage, matchday 3:
  - Group B:
    - Columbus Crew (United States) 3–0 (Trinidad and Tobago) Joe Public
    - Municipal (Guatemala) 2–2 (Mexico) Santos Laguna
      - Standings (after 3 matches): Santos Laguna 7 points, Columbus Crew 6, Municipal 2, Joe Public 1.
  - Group C:
    - Monterrey (Mexico) 2–0 (Honduras) Marathón
    - Saprissa (Costa Rica) 2–0 (United States) Seattle Sounders FC
      - Standings (after 3 matches): Monterrey 9 points, Saprissa 6, Marathón 3, Seattle Sounders FC 0.

==== Table tennis ====
- European Championships in Ostrava, Czech Republic:
  - Men's team semifinals:
    - **Germany** 3–1 France
    - **Belarus** 3–1 Czech Republic
  - Women's team semifinals:
    - **Netherlands** 3–0 Belarus
    - **Romania** 3–0 Poland

=== September 13, 2010 (Monday) ===
==== American football ====
- NFL Monday Night Football Week 1:
  - Baltimore Ravens 10, New York Jets 9
    - The Jets lose their first regular-season game at New Meadowlands Stadium.
  - Kansas City Chiefs 21, San Diego Chargers 14

==== Cycling ====
- Grand Tours:
  - Vuelta a España:
    - Stage 16: (gold) Mikel Nieve (ESP) (Euskaltel–Euskadi) 4h 51' 59" (silver) Fränk Schleck (LUX) (Team Saxo Bank) + 1' 06" (bronze) Kevin De Weert (BEL) (Quick-Step) + 1' 08"
      - General classification: (1) Joaquim Rodríguez (ESP) (Team Katusha) 70h 24' 39" (2) Vincenzo Nibali (ITA) (Liquigas–Doimo) + 33" (3) Ezequiel Mosquera (ESP) (Xacobeo–Galicia) + 53"

==== Football (soccer) ====
- FIFA U-17 Women's World Cup in Trinidad and Tobago: (teams in **bold** advance to the quarterfinals)
  - Group C:
    - **Japan** 6–0 New Zealand
    - Venezuela 1–2 **Spain**
      - Final standings: Spain 9 points, Japan 6, Venezuela 3, New Zealand 0.
  - Group D:
    - Ghana 0–3 **Republic of Ireland**
    - **Brazil** 2–0 Canada
      - Final standings: Republic of Ireland, Brazil 6 points, Canada, Ghana 3.

==== Judo ====
- World Judo Championships in Tokyo, Japan:
  - Men's Open Category: (gold) Daiki Kamikawa (JPN) (silver) Teddy Riner (FRA) (bronze) Keiji Suzuki (JPN) and Hiroki Tachiyama (JPN)
  - Women's Open Category: (gold) Mika Sugimoto (JPN) (silver) Qin Qian (CHN) (bronze) Tea Donguzashvili (RUS) and Megumi Tachimoto (JPN)

==== Tennis ====
- Grand Slams:
  - US Open in New York City, United States, day 15:
    - Men's singles, final: **Rafael Nadal** (ESP) [1] def. Novak Djokovic (SRB) [3] 6–4, 5–7, 6–4, 6–2
      - Nadal wins his first US Open, and ninth Grand Slam in total. In doing so, Nadal becomes the seventh man to complete a career Grand Slam, and the second to complete a career Golden Slam.
    - Women's doubles, final: **Vania King** (USA) / **Yaroslava Shvedova** (KAZ) [6] def. Liezel Huber (USA) / Nadia Petrova (RUS) [2] 2–6, 6–4, 7–6(4)
      - King and Shvedova win their second consecutive women's doubles Grand Slam title.

=== September 12, 2010 (Sunday) ===
==== American football ====
- NFL Week 1:
  - New York Giants 31, Carolina Panthers 18
    - The Giants win the first regular-season game at New Meadowlands Stadium.
  - Pittsburgh Steelers 15, Atlanta Falcons 9 (OT)
  - Tampa Bay Buccaneers 17, Cleveland Browns 14
  - Jacksonville Jaguars 24, Denver Broncos 17
  - Houston Texans 34, Indianapolis Colts 24
  - Miami Dolphins 15, Buffalo Bills 10
  - Chicago Bears 19, Detroit Lions 14
  - Tennessee Titans 38, Oakland Raiders 13
  - New England Patriots 38, Cincinnati Bengals 24
  - Arizona Cardinals 17, St. Louis Rams 13
  - Seattle Seahawks 31, San Francisco 49ers 6
  - Green Bay Packers 27, Philadelphia Eagles 20
  - Sunday Night Football: Washington Redskins 13, Dallas Cowboys 7

==== Auto racing ====
- Formula One:
  - Italian Grand Prix in Monza, Italy: (1) Fernando Alonso (ESP) (Ferrari) (2) Jenson Button (GBR) (McLaren–Mercedes) (3) Felipe Massa (BRA) (Ferrari)
    - Drivers' championship standings (after 14 of 19 races): (1) Mark Webber (AUS) (Red Bull–Renault) 187 points (2) Lewis Hamilton (GBR) (McLaren-Mercedes) 182 (3) Alonso 166
    - Constructors' championship standings: (1) Red Bull 350 points (2) McLaren 347 (3) Ferrari 290
- V8 Supercars:
  - L&H 500 in Phillip Island (Victoria): (1) Craig Lowndes (AUS)/Mark Skaife (AUS) (Holden Commodore) (2) Mark Winterbottom (AUS)/Luke Youlden (AUS) (Ford Falcon) (3) Jason Richards (NZL)/Andrew Jones (AUS) (Holden Commodore)
    - Drivers' championship standings (after 17 of 26 races): (1) James Courtney (AUS) (Ford Falcon) 2101 points (2) Jamie Whincup (AUS) (Holden Commodore) 1922 (3) Winterbottom 1862
- World Rally Championship:
  - Rally Japan in Hokkaidō: (1) Sébastien Ogier (FRA)/Julien Ingrassia (FRA) (Citroën C4 WRC) (2) Petter Solberg (NOR)/Chris Patterson (GBR) (Citroën C4 WRC) (3) Jari-Matti Latvala (FIN)/Miikka Anttila (FIN) (Ford Focus RS WRC 09)
    - Drivers' championship standings (after 10 of 13 rounds): (1) Sébastien Loeb (FRA) (Citroën C4 WRC) 201 points (2) Ogier 158 (3) Latvala 132

==== Basketball ====
- FIBA World Championship in Istanbul, Turkey:
  - 5th place playoff: Spain 81–86 **Argentina**
  - 3rd place playoff: Serbia 88–99 (bronze) **Lithuania**
  - Final: (silver) Turkey 64–81 (gold) **United States**
    - The USA win their fourth world title.
- WNBA Playoffs:
  - WNBA Finals, Game 1: Seattle Storm 79, Atlanta Dream 77. Storm lead series 1–0.

==== Canoeing ====
- Slalom World Championships in Ljublijana, Slovenia:
  - Women's C-1: (gold) Jana Dukátová (SVK) (silver) Leanne Guinea (AUS) (bronze) Jessica Fox (AUS)
  - Men's C-1: (gold) Tony Estanguet (FRA) (silver) Michal Martikán (SVK) (bronze) Jordi Domenjó (ESP)
  - Men's K-1: (gold) Daniele Molmenti (ITA) (silver) Vavřinec Hradilek (CZE) (bronze) Jure Meglič (SVN)
  - Men's C-1 team: (gold) Slovakia (silver) Germany (bronze) Czech Republic
  - Men's K-1 team: (gold) Germany (silver) France (bronze) Italy

==== Cricket ====
- Pakistan in England:
  - 2nd ODI in Leeds: Pakistan 294/8 (50 overs); England 295/6 (49.3 overs; Andrew Strauss 126). **England win by 4 wickets; lead 5-match series 2–0.**

==== Cue sports ====
- World Cup of Pool:
  - Semifinals:
    - **Fu Jianbo/Li Hewen** (CHN) 9–7 Ralf Souquet/Oliver Ortmann (GER)
    - **Roberto Gomez/Dennis Orcollo** (PHI) 9–8 Ko Pin-yi/Chang Jung-lin (TPE)
  - Final: **Fu/Li** 10–5 Gomez/Orcollo

==== Cycling ====
- Grand Tours:
  - Vuelta a España:
    - Stage 15: (gold) Carlos Barredo (ESP) (Quick-Step) 4h 33' 09" (silver) Nico Sijmens (BEL) (Cofidis) + 1' 07" (bronze) Martin Velits (SVK) (Team HTC–Columbia) + 1' 43"
      - General classification: (1) Vincenzo Nibali (ITA) (Liquigas–Doimo) 65h 31' 14" (2) Joaquim Rodríguez (ESP) (Team Katusha) + 4" (3) Ezequiel Mosquera (ESP) (Xacobeo–Galicia) + 39"
- UCI ProTour:
  - GP de Montréal: (gold) Robert Gesink (NED) (Rabobank) 4h 58' 22" (silver) Peter Sagan (SVK) (Liquigas–Doimo) + 4" (bronze) Ryder Hesjedal (CAN) (Garmin–Transitions) + 4"
    - UCI World Rankings (after 24 of 26 events): (1) Alberto Contador (ESP) (Astana) 482 points (2) Rodríguez 428 (3) Cadel Evans (AUS) (BMC Racing Team) 390

==== Equestrianism ====
- Show jumping:
  - Spruce Meadows Masters in Calgary (CSIO 5*):
    - CN International Grand Prix: (gold) Jeroen Dubbeldam (NED) on Simon (silver) Richard Spooner (USA) on Cristallo (bronze) Eric Lamaze (CAN) on Hickstead
  - HITS-on-the-Hudson Horse Show, Saugerties, New York:
    - Pfizer $1m Grand Prix: (gold) McLain Ward (USA) on Sapphire (silver) Charlie Jayne (USA) on Athena (bronze) John Pearce (CAN) on Chianto

==== Football (soccer) ====
- 2011 FIFA Women's World Cup qualification (UEFA):
  - Play-offs, first leg:
    - England 2–0 Switzerland
- FIFA U-17 Women's World Cup in Trinidad and Tobago: (teams in **bold** advance to the quarterfinals)
  - Group A:
    - **North Korea** 1–0 Trinidad and Tobago
    - Chile 0–5 **Nigeria**
      - Final standings: Nigeria 9 points, Korea DPR 6, Trinidad and Tobago 3, Chile 0.
  - Group B:
    - **South Korea** 0–3 **Germany**
    - Mexico 4–0 South Africa
      - Final standings: Germany 9 points, Korea Republic 6, Mexico 3, South Africa 0.
- CAF Champions League group stage, matchday 5: (teams in **bold** advance to the semifinals)
  - Group A: **TP Mazembe** (Democratic Republic of the Congo) 2–1 (Zimbabwe) Dynamos
    - Standings (after 5 matches): (Tunisia) **Espérance ST**, TP Mazembe 10 points, (Algeria) ES Sétif 5, Dynamos 3.
  - Group B: **Al-Ahly** (Egypt) 2–1 (Nigeria) Heartland
    - Standings (after 5 matches): (Algeria) **JS Kabylie** 13 points, Al-Ahly 8, Heartland 4, (Egypt) Ismaily 3.
- CAF Confederation Cup group stage, matchday 3:
  - Group A: Ittihad (Libya) 4–0 (Niger) ASFAN
    - Standings (after 3 matches): (Sudan) Al-Hilal 9 points, Ittihad 6, (Mali) Djoliba, ASFAN 1.
  - Group B: FUS Rabat (Morocco) 1–0 (Egypt) Haras El Hodood
    - Standings (after 3 matches): FUS Rabat 6 points, (Tunisia) CS Sfaxien, (Zambia) Zanaco 4, Haras El Hodood 2.

==== Golf ====
- PGA Tour:
  - FedEx Cup Playoffs: BMW Championship in Lemont, Illinois:
    - Winner: Dustin Johnson (USA) 275 (−9)
      - Johnson wins his second PGA Tour title of the season and fourth of his career.
- European Tour:
  - KLM Open in Hilversum, Netherlands:
    - Winner: Martin Kaymer (GER) 266 (−14)
      - Kaymer wins his second European Tour title of the season and seventh of his career.
- LPGA Tour:
  - P&G NW Arkansas Championship in Rogers, Arkansas:
    - Winner: Yani Tseng (TWN) 200 (−13)
      - Tseng wins her third LPGA Tour title of the season, and fifth of her career.
- Champions Tour:
  - Posco E&C Songdo Championship in Songdo, South Korea:
    - Winner: Russ Cochran (USA) 204 (−12)^{PO}
      - Cochran wins his first Champions Tour title on the first hole of a playoff with fellow American Fred Funk.

==== Judo ====
- World Judo Championships in Tokyo, Japan:
  - Men's 66 kg: (gold) Junpei Morishita (JPN) (silver) Leandro Cunha (BRA) (bronze) Khashbaataryn Tsagaanbaatar (MGL) and Loic Korval (FRA)
  - Men's 60 kg: (gold) Rishod Sobirov (UZB) (silver) Georgii Zantaraia (UKR) (bronze) Arsen Galstyan (RUS) and Hiroaki Hiraoka (JPN)
  - Women's 52 kg: (gold) Yuka Nishida (JPN) (silver) Misato Nakamura (JPN) (bronze) Natalia Kuzyutina (RUS) and Mönkhbaataryn Bundmaa (MGL)
  - Women's 48 kg: (gold) Haruna Asami (JPN) (silver) Tomoko Fukumi (JPN) (bronze) Alina Alexandra Dumitru (ROU) and Sarah Menezes (BRA)

==== Rowing ====
- European Championships in Montemor-o-Velho, Portugal:
  - Men:
    - M2-: (gold) Greece (silver) Italy (bronze) Serbia
    - M2x: (gold) France (silver) Estonia (bronze) Czech Republic
    - M4-: (gold) Germany (silver) Greece (bronze) Czech Republic
    - M1x: (gold) Czech Republic (silver) Sweden (bronze) Germany
    - LM2x: (gold) Germany (silver) Portugal (bronze) France
    - LM4-: (gold) Germany (silver) Poland (bronze) Switzerland
    - M4x: (gold) Poland (silver) Croatia (bronze) Ukraine
    - M8+: (gold) Germany (silver) Poland (bronze) Ukraine
  - Women:
    - W2-: (gold) Romania (silver) Germany (bronze) Croatia
    - W2x: (gold) Germany (silver) Poland (bronze) Italy
    - W1x: (gold) Belarus (silver) Czech Republic (bronze) Sweden
    - LW2x: (gold) Greece (silver) Poland (bronze) Germany
    - W4x: (gold) Ukraine (silver) Germany (bronze) Switzerland
    - W8+: (gold) Romania (silver) Netherlands (bronze) Germany

==== Rugby league ====
- NRL finals series:
  - Qualifying Finals: **St. George Illawarra Dragons** 28–0 Manly-Warringah Sea Eagles

==== Snooker ====
- Shanghai Masters:
  - Final: Jamie Burnett (SCO) 7–10 **Ali Carter** (ENG)
    - Carter wins the second ranking title of his career.

==== Tennis ====
- Grand Slams:
  - US Open in New York City, United States, day 14:
    - Men's singles, final: Rafael Nadal (ESP) [1] vs. Novak Djokovic (SRB) [3]. Postponed to September 13 due to rain.
    - Women's doubles, final: Vania King (USA) / Yaroslava Shvedova (KAZ) [6] vs. Liezel Huber (USA) / Nadia Petrova (RUS) [2] 2–6, 6–4, 4–5 (match suspended)

==== Wrestling ====
- World Championships in Moscow, Russia:
  - Men's freestyle 66 kg: (gold) Sushil Kumar (IND) (silver) Alan Gogayev (RUS) (bronze) Jabrail Hasanov (AZE) and Geandry Garzón (CUB)
  - Men's freestyle 74 kg: (gold) Denis Tsargush (RUS) (silver) Sadegh Goudarzi (IRN) (bronze) Gábor Hatos (HUN) and bdulkhakim Shapiyev (KAZ)
  - Men's freestyle 120 kg: (gold) Beylal Makhov (RUS) (silver) Artur Taymazov (UZB) (bronze) Levan Berianidze (GEO) and Ioannis Arzoumanidis (GRE)

=== September 11, 2010 (Saturday) ===
==== American football ====
- NCAA:
  - AP Top 10:
    - (1) Alabama 24, (18) Penn State 3
    - (2) Ohio State 36, (12) Miami 24
    - (4) TCU 62, Tennessee Tech 7
    - (5) Texas 34, Wyoming 7
    - (6) Nebraska 38, Idaho 17
    - (7) Oregon 48, Tennessee 13
    - (8) Florida 38, South Florida 14
    - (9) Iowa 35, Iowa State 7
    - (10) Oklahoma 47, (17) Florida State 17
  - Other games:
    - James Madison 21, (13) Virginia Tech 16
    - Kansas 28, (15) Georgia Tech 25
    - (24) South Carolina 17, (22) Georgia 6
  - Idle: (3) Boise State

==== Australian rules football ====
- AFL finals series:
  - First Semi-final in Melbourne: **Western Bulldogs** 11.11 (77)–10.12 (72) Sydney

==== Auto racing ====
- NASCAR Sprint Cup Series:
  - Air Guard 400 in Richmond, Virginia: (1) Denny Hamlin (Toyota; Joe Gibbs Racing) (2) (Nevada) Kyle Busch (Toyota; Joe Gibbs Racing) (3) (California) Jimmie Johnson (Chevrolet; Hendrick Motorsports)
    - Drivers qualifying for the Chase for the Sprint Cup — points through 26 races, followed by points entering the Chase in parentheses:

1. (California) Kevin Harvick (Chevrolet; Richard Childress Racing) 3723 points (5030)
2. Kyle Busch 3495 (5030)
3. (California) Jeff Gordon (Chevrolet; Hendrick Motorsports) 3493 (5000)
4. (Missouri) Carl Edwards (Ford; Roush Fenway Racing) 3427 (5000)
5. Johnson 3417 (5050)
6. (Indiana) Tony Stewart (Chevrolet; Stewart Haas Racing) 3417 (5010)
7. (Virginia) Jeff Burton (Chevrolet; Richard Childress Racing) 3390 (5000)
8. (Wisconsin) Matt Kenseth (Ford, Roush Fenway Racing) 3346 (5000)
9. Hamlin 3342 (5060)
10. (Nevada) Kurt Busch (Dodge; Penske Racing) 3337 (5020)
11. (Kansas) Clint Bowyer (Chevrolet; Richard Childress Racing) 3221 (5000)
12. (Washington (state)) Greg Biffle (Ford; Roush Fenway Racing) 3177 (5010)

==== Basketball ====
- FIBA World Championship in Istanbul, Turkey:
  - 7th place playoff: Slovenia 78–83 **Russia**
  - Semifinals:
    - Serbia 82–83 **Turkey**
    - **United States** 89–74 Lithuania

==== Canoeing ====
- Slalom World Championships in Ljublijana, Slovenia:
  - Men's C-2: (gold) Pavol Hochschorner/Peter Hochschorner (SVK) (silver) Denis Gargaud Chanut/Fabien Lefèvre (FRA) (bronze) David Florence/Richard Hounslow (GBR)
  - Women's K-1: (gold) Corinna Kuhnle (AUT) (silver) Jana Dukátová (SVK) (bronze) Violetta Oblinger-Peters (AUT)
  - Men's C-2 team: (gold) France (silver) Czech Republic (bronze) Germany
  - Women's K-1 team: (gold) Czech Republic (silver) Germany (bronze) Slovenia

==== Cue sports ====
- World Cup of Pool in Manila, Philippines:
  - Quarterfinals:
    - Muhammad Zulfikri/Ricky Yang (INA) 3–9 **Fu Jianbo**/**Li Hewen** (CHN)
    - **Ralf Souquet**/**Oliver Ortmann** (GER) 9–7 Stephan Cohen/François Cottance (FRA)
    - **Roberto Gomez**/**Dennis Orcollo** (PHI) 9–1 Mika Immonen/Markus Juva (FIN)
    - **Ko Pin-yi**/**Chang Jung-lin** (TWN) 9–5 Radosław Babica/Mariusz Skoneczny (POL)

==== Cycling ====
- Grand Tours:
  - Vuelta a España:
    - Stage 14: (gold) Joaquim Rodríguez (ESP) (Team Katusha) 4h 26' 43" (silver) Vincenzo Nibali (ITA) (Liquigas–Doimo) + 20" (bronze) Ezequiel Mosquera (ESP) (Xacobeo–Galicia) + 22"
      - General classification: (1) Nibali 60h 55' 39" (2) Rodríguez + 4" (3) Mosquera + 50"

==== Equestrianism ====
- Show jumping:
  - 2011 FEI Nations Cup Promotional League North and South America:
    - Nations Cup of Canada in Calgary (CSIO 5*): (gold) United States (Rich Fellers on Flexible, Ashlee Bond on Cadett, Richard Spooner on Cristallo, Beezie Madden on Coral Reef Via Volo) (silver) Ireland (Trevor Breen on Adventure de Kannan, Nicola Fitzgibbon on Puissance, David Quigley on Ulot, Shane Sweetnam on Amaretto D'Arco) (bronze) Canada (John Anderson on Terrific, Jonathon Millar on Contino, Yann Candele on Pitareusa, Eric Lamaze on Hickstead)
  - FEI World Cup North American League – East Coast:
    - 5th competition in Saugerties, New York (CSI 2*-W): (gold) McLain Ward (USA) on Rothchild (silver) John Pearce (CAN) on Son of a Gun (bronze) Saer Coulter (USA) on Chalan

==== Field hockey ====
- Women's World Cup in Rosario, Argentina:
  - 3rd place playoff: (bronze) **England** 2–0 Germany
  - Final: (silver) Netherlands 1–3 (gold) **Argentina**
    - Argentina win the title for the second time, repeating their 2002 final victory over the Netherlands.

==== Figure skating ====
- ISU Junior Grand Prix in Brașov, Romania:
  - Men: (gold) Keegan Messing (USA) 187.38 points (silver) Joshua Farris (USA) 179.22 (bronze) Keiji Tanaka (JPN) 166.48
    - Standings (after 2 of 7 events): Messing, Andrei Rogozine (CAN) 15 points (1 event), Thomas Sosniak (FRA) 14 (2), Jason Brown (USA), Farris 13 (1), Max Aaron (USA), Tanaka 11 (1).
  - Ice Dance: (gold) Ksenia Monko / Kirill Khaliavin (RUS) 138.27 points (silver) Anastasia Galyeta / Alexei Shumski (UKR) 124.65 (bronze) Lauri Bonacorsi / Travis Mager (USA) 110.58
    - Standings (after 2 of 7 events): Monko/Khaliavin, Alexandra Stepanova/Ivan Bukin (RUS) 15 points (1 event), Galyeta/Shumski, Anastasia Cannuscio/Colin McManus (USA) 13 (1), Bonacorsi/Mager, Evgenia Kosigina/Nikolai Moroshkin (RUS) 11 (1).

==== Football (soccer) ====
- 2011 FIFA Women's World Cup qualification (UEFA):
  - Play-offs, first leg:
    - Sweden 2–1 Denmark
    - Ukraine 0–1 Norway
    - France 0–0 Italy
- CAF Champions League group stage, matchday 5: (teams in **bold** advance to the semifinals)
  - Group A: **Espérance ST** (Tunisia) 2–2 (Algeria) ES Sétif
    - Standings: Espérance ST 10 points (5 matches), (Democratic Republic of the Congo) TP Mazembe 7 (4), ES Sétif 5 (5), (Zimbabwe) Dynamos 3 (4).
- CAF Confederation Cup group stage, matchday 3:
  - Group B: Zanaco (Zambia) 1–0 (Tunisia) CS Sfaxien
    - Standings: CS Sfaxien, Zanaco 4 points (3 matches), (Morocco) FUS Rabat 3 (2), (Egypt) Haras El Hodood 2 (2).

==== Horse racing ====
- English Triple Crown:
  - St. Leger Stakes in Doncaster, South Yorkshire: (gold) Arctic Cosmos (trainer: John Gosden, jockey: William Buick) (silver) Midas Touch (trainer: Aidan O'Brien, jockey: Colm O'Donoghue) (bronze) Corsica (trainer: Mark Johnston, jockey: Joe Fanning)

==== Judo ====
- World Judo Championships in Tokyo, Japan:
  - Men's 73 kg: (gold) Hiroyuki Akimoto (JPN) (silver) Dex Elmont (NED) (bronze) Wang Ki-chun (KOR) and Yasuhiro Awano (JPN)
  - Women's 63 kg: (gold) Yoshie Ueno (JPN) (silver) Miki Tanaka (JPN) (bronze) Yaritza Abel (CUB) and Ramila Yusubova (AZE)
  - Women's 57 kg: (gold) Kaori Matsumoto (JPN) (silver) Telma Monteiro (POR) (bronze) Sabrina Filzmoser (AUT) and Ioulietta Boukouvala (GRE)

==== Rowing ====
- European Championships in Montemor-o-Velho, Portugal:
  - Men:
    - M2+: (gold) Belarus (silver) Italy (bronze) Czech Republic
    - LM1x: (gold) Italy (silver) Netherlands (bronze) Slovakia
    - LM2-: (gold) France (silver) Netherlands (bronze) Spain
    - LM4x: (gold) Italy (silver) Denmark (bronze) France
    - LM8+: (gold) Italy (silver) Denmark (bronze) Portugal
  - Women:
    - W4-: (gold) Belarus (silver) Italy
    - LW1x: (gold) Germany (silver) Austria (bronze) Italy
    - LW4x: (gold) Italy (silver) Denmark

==== Rugby league ====
- NRL finals series:
  - Qualifying Finals:
    - Wests Tigers 15–19 **Sydney Roosters**
    - Penrith Panthers 22–24 **Canberra Raiders**

==== Rugby union ====
- Tri Nations Series:
  - Australia 22–23 New Zealand in Sydney
    - Final standings: New Zealand 27 points, Australia 11, South Africa 8.
    - The All Blacks win all six games, the first side to do so in a single Tri Nations series.

==== Snooker ====
- Shanghai Masters, Semifinal:
  - **Jamie Burnett** (SCO) 6–1 Jamie Cope (ENG)
  - **Ali Carter** (ENG) 6–2 Mark Selby (ENG)

==== Tennis ====
- Grand Slams:
  - US Open in New York City, United States, day 13:
    - Men's singles, semifinals:
      - **Rafael Nadal** (ESP) [1] def. Mikhail Youzhny (RUS) [12] 6–2, 6–3, 6–4
      - **Novak Djokovic** (SRB) [3] def. Roger Federer (SUI) [2] 5–7, 6–1, 5–7, 6–2, 7–5
    - Women's singles, final: **Kim Clijsters** (BEL) [2] def. Vera Zvonareva (RUS) [7] 6–2, 6–1
      - Clijsters defends her title, winning the third US Open – and Grand Slam – singles title of her career.

==== Volleyball ====
- The 109-match winning streak of the Penn State women's team ends with a straight-set defeat to Stanford in a tournament in Florida. The streak was the longest in NCAA women's volleyball history, and the second-longest in the history of Division I team sports. (AP via ESPN)

==== Water polo ====
- Men's European Championship in Zagreb, Croatia:
  - Bronze medal match: (bronze) **Serbia** 10–8 Hungary
  - Final: (gold) **Croatia** 7–3 (silver) Italy
    - Croatia win the title for the first time.

==== Wrestling ====
- World Championships in Moscow, Russia:
  - Men's freestyle 60 kg: (gold) Besik Kudukhov (RUS) (silver) Vasyl Fedoryshyn (UKR) (bronze) Morad Mohammadi (IRN) and Zelimkhan Huseynov (AZE)
  - Men's freestyle 84 kg: (gold) Mihail Ganev (BUL) (silver) Zaurbek Sokhiev (UZB) (bronze) Soslan Ktsoyev (RUS) and Reineris Salas (CUB)
  - Men's freestyle 96 kg: (gold) Khetag Gazyumov (AZE) (silver) Khadjimourat Gatsalov (RUS) (bronze) Aleksey Krupnyakov (KGZ) and Georgi Gogshelidze (GEO)

=== September 10, 2010 (Friday) ===
==== Australian rules football ====
- AFL finals series:
  - Second Semi-final in Melbourne: **Geelong** 20.15 (135)–10.6 (66) Fremantle

==== Auto racing ====
- Nationwide Series:
  - Virginia 529 College Savings 250 in Richmond, Virginia: (1) (California) Kevin Harvick (Chevrolet; Kevin Harvick Inc.) (2) (Michigan) Brad Keselowski (Dodge; Penske Racing) (3) (Tennessee) Trevor Bayne (Toyota; Diamond-Waltrip Racing)
    - Drivers' championship standings (after 27 of 35 races): (1) Keselowski 4302 points (2) (Missouri) Carl Edwards (Ford; Roush Fenway Racing) 3929 (3) (Nevada) Kyle Busch (Toyota; Joe Gibbs Racing) 3719

==== Basketball ====
- FIBA World Championship in Istanbul, Turkey:
  - 5th–8th place semifinals:
    - **Spain** 97–80 Slovenia
    - Russia 61–73 **Argentina**

==== Cricket ====
- Pakistan in England:
  - 1st ODI in Chester-le-Street: England 274/6 (41/41 overs); Pakistan 250/9 (41 overs). **England win by 24 runs; lead 5-match series 1–0.**

==== Cycling ====
- Grand Tours:
  - Vuelta a España:
    - Stage 13: (gold) Mark Cavendish (GBR) (Team HTC–Columbia) 4h 50' 18" (silver) Thor Hushovd (NOR) (Cervélo TestTeam) s.t. (bronze) Daniele Bennati (ITA) (Liquigas–Doimo) s.t.
      - General classification: (1) Igor Antón (ESP) (Euskaltel–Euskadi) 56h 28' 03" (2) Vincenzo Nibali (ITA) (Liquigas–Doimo) + 45" (3) Xavier Tondó (ESP) (Cervélo TestTeam) + 1' 04"
- UCI ProTour:
  - GP de Québec: (gold) Thomas Voeckler (FRA) (Bbox Bouygues Telecom) 4h 35' 26" (silver) Edvald Boasson Hagen (NOR) (Team Sky) + 2" (bronze) Robert Gesink (NED) (Rabobank) + 2"
    - UCI World Rankings (after 23 of 26 events): (1) Alberto Contador (ESP) (Astana) 482 points (2) Joaquim Rodríguez (ESP) (Team Katusha) 428 (3) Cadel Evans (AUS) (BMC Racing Team) 390

==== Equestrianism ====
- Show jumping:
  - Spruce Meadows Masters in Calgary (CSIO 5*):
    - ENCANA Cup: (gold) Rik Hemeryck (BEL) on Quarco de Kerambars (silver) Beezie Madden (USA) on Mademoiselle (bronze) Werner Muff (SUI) on Quax II

==== Field hockey ====
- Women's World Cup in Rosario, Argentina:
  - 9th place playoff: **India** 4–3 South Africa
  - 7th place playoff: **New Zealand** 3–0 China
  - 5th place playoff: **Australia** 2–1 South Korea

==== Figure skating ====
- ISU Junior Grand Prix in Brașov, Romania:
  - Ice Dance – short dance: (1) Ksenia Monko / Kirill Khaliavin (RUS) 55.22 (2) Anastasia Galyeta / Alexei Shumski (UKR) 47.66 (3) Tiffany Zahorski / Alexis Miart (FRA) 46.98
  - Ladies: (gold) Elizaveta Tuktamysheva (RUS) 132.32 (silver) Kristiene Gong (USA) 130.10 (bronze) Shion Kokubun (JPN) 128.78
    - Standings (after 2 of 7 events): Rosa Sheveleva (RUS) 16 points (2 events), Polina Shelepen (RUS), Tuktamysheva 15 (1), Yasmin Siraj (USA), Gong 13 (1), Kokubun 11 (1).

==== Football (soccer) ====
- CAF Champions League group stage, matchday 5: (teams in **bold** advance to the semifinals)
  - Group B: **JS Kabylie** (Algeria) 1–0 (Egypt) Ismaily
    - Standings: JS Kabylie 13 points (5 matches), (Egypt) Al-Ahly 5 (4), (Nigeria) Heartland 4 (3), Ismaily 3 (5).
- CAF Confederation Cup group stage, matchday 3:
  - Group A: Al-Hilal (Sudan) 2–1 (Mali) Djoliba
    - Standings: Al-Hilal 9 points (3 matches), (Libya) Al-Ittihad 3 (2), (Niger) ASFAN 1 (2), Djoliba 1 (3).

==== Judo ====
- World Judo Championships in Tokyo, Japan:
  - Men's 90 kg: (gold) Ilias Iliadis (GRE) (silver) Daiki Nishiyama (JPN) (bronze) Elkhan Mammadov (AZE) and Kirill Denisov (RUS)
  - Men's 81 kg: (gold) Kim Jae-Bum (KOR) (silver) Leandro Guilheiro (BRA) (bronze) Masahiro Takamatsu (JPN) and Euan Burton (GBR)
  - Women's 70 kg: (gold) Lucie Décosse (FRA) (silver) Anett Meszaros (HUN) (bronze) Yoriko Kunihara (JPN) and Raša Sraka (SLO)

==== Rugby league ====
- NRL finals series:
  - Qualifying Finals: **Gold Coast Titans** 28–16 New Zealand Warriors

==== Snooker ====
- Shanghai Masters, Quarterfinals:
  - **Jamie Burnett** (SCO) 5–4 Mark Davis (ENG)
  - Graeme Dott (SCO) 2–5 **Jamie Cope** (ENG)
  - **Ali Carter** (ENG) 5–4 Matthew Stevens (WAL)
  - **Mark Selby** (ENG) 5–1 Mark King (ENG)

==== Tennis ====
- Grand Slams:
  - US Open in New York City, United States, day 12:
    - Women's singles, semifinals:
      - **Vera Zvonareva** (RUS) [7] def. Caroline Wozniacki (DEN) [1] 6–4, 6–3
      - **Kim Clijsters** (BEL) [2] def. Venus Williams (USA) [3] 4–6, 7–6(2), 6–4
    - Men's doubles, final: **Bob Bryan** (USA)/**Mike Bryan** (USA) [1] def. Rohan Bopanna (IND)/Aisam-ul-Haq Qureshi (PAK) [16] 7–6(5), 7–6(4)
      - The Bryans win their third US Open and ninth Grand Slam men's doubles title.

==== Water polo ====
- Men's European Championship in Zagreb, Croatia:
  - 9th place playoff: **Greece** 10–7 Turkey
  - 7th place playoff: Spain 7–8 **Romania**
  - 5th place playoff: Germany 6–14 **Montenegro**
- Women's European Championship in Zagreb, Croatia:
  - Bronze Medal Match: Italy 12–14 (bronze) **Netherlands**
  - Final: (silver) Greece 6–11 (gold) **Russia**
    - Russia win the title for the third successive time.

==== Wrestling ====
- World Championships in Moscow, Russia:
  - Women's freestyle 67 kg: (gold) Martine Dugrenier (CAN) (silver) Yelena Shalygina (KAZ) (bronze) Ifeoma Iheanacho (NGR) and Alla Cherkasova (UKR)
  - Women's freestyle 72 kg: (gold) Stanka Zlateva (BUL) (silver) Ohenewa Akuffo (CAN) (bronze) Ekaterina Bukina (RUS) and Kyoko Hamaguchi (JPN)
  - Men's freestyle 55 kg: (gold) Viktor Lebedev (RUS) (silver) Toghrul Asgarov (AZE) (bronze) Frank Chamizo (CUB) and Yasuhiro Inaba (JPN)

=== September 9, 2010 (Thursday) ===
==== American football ====
- NFL Week 1:
  - Kickoff game: New Orleans Saints 14, Minnesota Vikings 9

==== Basketball ====
- FIBA World Championship in Istanbul, Turkey:
  - Quarterfinals:
    - **United States** 89–79 Russia
    - **Lithuania** 104–85 Argentina

==== Cycling ====
- Grand Tours:
  - Vuelta a España:
    - Stage 12: (gold) Mark Cavendish (GBR) (Team HTC–Columbia) 4h 00' 30" (silver) Tyler Farrar (USA) (Garmin–Transitions) s.t. (bronze) Matthew Goss (AUS) (Team HTC–Columbia) s.t.
      - General classification: (1) Igor Antón (ESP) (Euskaltel–Euskadi) 51h 37' 45" (2) Vincenzo Nibali (ITA) (Liquigas–Doimo) + 45" (3) Xavier Tondó (ESP) (Cervélo TestTeam) + 1' 04"

==== Field hockey ====
- Women's World Cup in Rosario, Argentina:
  - Semifinals:
    - **Netherlands** 1–1 (4–3 pen.) England
    - **Argentina** 2–1 Germany
  - 11th place playoff: **Japan** 2–1 Spain

==== Figure skating ====
- ISU Junior Grand Prix in Brașov, Romania:
  - Ladies – short program: (1) Yuki Nishino (JPN) 48.98 points (2) Rosa Sheveleva (RUS) 47.54 (3) Kristiene Gong (USA) 47.08
  - Men – short program: (1) Joshua Farris (USA) 67.03 points (2) Keegan Messing (USA) 65.33 (3) Keiji Tanaka (JPN) 57.98

==== Football (soccer) ====
- FIFA U-17 Women's World Cup in Trinidad and Tobago:
  - Group C:
    - New Zealand 1–3 Spain
    - Japan 6–0 Venezuela
      - Standings (after 2 matches): Spain 6 points, Japan, Venezuela 3, New Zealand 0.
  - Group D:
    - Republic of Ireland 1–0 Canada
    - Ghana 1–0 Brazil
      - Standings (after 2 matches): Brazil, Republic of Ireland, Canada, Ghana 3 points.
- Copa Sudamericana second stage, first leg:
  - Universitario (Bolivia) 1–0 (Paraguay) Cerro Porteño
- Copa Sudamericana second stage, second leg: (first leg scores in parentheses)
  - Argentinos Juniors (Argentina) 1–1 (0–1) (Argentina) **Independiente**. Independiente win 4–1 on points.

==== Judo ====
- World Judo Championships in Tokyo, Japan:
  - Men's +100 kg: (gold) Teddy Riner (FRA) (silver) Andreas Tölzer (GER) (bronze) Matthieu Bataille (FRA) and Islam El Shehaby (EGY)
  - Men's 100 kg: (gold) Takamasa Anai (JPN) (silver) Henk Grol (NED) (bronze) Oreidis Despaigne (CUB) and Thierry Fabre (FRA)
  - Women's +78 kg: (gold) Mika Sugimoto (JPN) (silver) Qin Qian (CHN) (bronze) Idalys Ortiz (CUB) and Maki Tsukada (JPN)
  - Women's 78 kg: (gold) Kayla Harrison (USA) (silver) Mayra Aguiar (BRA) (bronze) Akari Ogata (JPN) and Yang Xiuli (CHN)

==== Snooker ====
- Shanghai Masters, Last 16:
  - **Jamie Burnett** (SCO) 5–0 Andrew Higginson (ENG)
  - **Mark Davis** (ENG) 5–3 Stephen Maguire (SCO) (5)
  - Mark Williams (WAL) (7) 4–5 **Graeme Dott** (SCO) (12)
  - **Jamie Cope** (ENG) (16) 5–1 Ding Junhui (CHN) (4)
  - **Ali Carter** (ENG) (3) 5–3 Stuart Bingham (ENG)
  - **Matthew Stevens** (WAL) 5–2 Shaun Murphy (ENG) (6)
  - **Mark Selby** (ENG) (8) 5–4 Martin Gould (ENG)
  - **Mark King** (ENG) (14) 5–3 Peter Ebdon (ENG)

==== Tennis ====
- Grand Slams:
  - US Open in New York City, United States, day 11:
    - Men's singles, quarterfinals:
      - **Rafael Nadal** (ESP) [1] def. Fernando Verdasco (ESP) [8] 7–5, 6–3, 6–4
      - **Mikhail Youzhny** (RUS) [12] def. Stanislas Wawrinka (SUI) [25] 3–6, 7–6(7), 3–6, 6–3, 6–3
    - Mixed doubles, final: **Liezel Huber** (USA)/**Bob Bryan** (USA) [1] def. Květa Peschke (CZE)/Aisam-ul-Haq Qureshi (PAK) 6–4, 6–4
      - Huber wins her second mixed doubles Grand Slam title, and Bryan wins his seventh.

==== Water polo ====
- Men's European Championship in Zagreb, Croatia:
  - Semifinals:
    - Serbia 9–10 **Croatia**
    - **Italy** 10–8 Hungary
  - 7th–12th Semifinals:
    - **Spain** 12–11 (2OT) Greece
    - Turkey 8–15 **Romania**
  - 11th place playoff: **Russia** 5–4 North Macedonia

==== Wrestling ====
- World Championships in Moscow, Russia:
  - Women's freestyle 55 kg: (gold) Saori Yoshida (JPN) (silver) Yuliya Ratkevich (AZE) (bronze) Anna Gomis (FRA) and Tatiana Padilla (USA)
  - Women's freestyle 59 kg: (gold) Soronzonboldiin Battsetseg (MGL) (silver) Zhang Lan (CHN) (bronze) Ayako Shoda (JPN) and Johanna Mattsson (SWE)
  - Women's freestyle 63 kg: (gold) Kaori Icho (JPN) (silver) Elena Pirozhkova (USA) (bronze) Hanna Johansson (SWE) and Lubov Volosova (RUS)

=== September 8, 2010 (Wednesday) ===
==== Basketball ====
- FIBA World Championship in Istanbul, Turkey:
  - Quarterfinals:
    - **Serbia** 92–89 Spain
    - Slovenia 68–95 **Turkey**

==== Cycling ====
- Grand Tours:
  - Vuelta a España:
    - Stage 11: (gold) Igor Antón (ESP) (Euskaltel–Euskadi) 5h 25' 44" (silver) Ezequiel Mosquera (ESP) (Xacobeo–Galicia) + 3" (bronze) Xavier Tondó (ESP) (Cervélo TestTeam) + 10"
      - General classification: (1) Antón 47h 37' 15" (2) Vincenzo Nibali (ITA) (Liquigas–Doimo) + 45" (3) Tondó + 1' 04"

==== Football (soccer) ====
- FIFA U-17 Women's World Cup in Trinidad and Tobago: (teams in **bold** advance to the quarter-finals)
  - Group A:
    - North Korea 3–0 Chile
    - Trinidad and Tobago 1–2 **Nigeria**
      - Standings (after 2 matches): Nigeria 6 points, Korea DPR, Trinidad and Tobago 3, Chile 0.
  - Group B:
    - **Germany** 10–1 South Africa
    - **South Korea** 4–1 Mexico
      - Standings (after 2 matches): Germany, Korea Republic 6 points, South Africa, Mexico 0.
- Recopa Sudamericana, second leg: (first leg score in parentheses)
  - Estudiantes (Argentina) 0–0 (1–2) (Ecuador) **LDU Quito**. LDU Quito win 4–1 on points.
    - LDU Quito win their second consecutive Recopa.

==== Snooker ====
- Shanghai Masters, First round:
  - Neil Robertson (AUS) (2) 4–5 **Peter Ebdon** (ENG)
  - **Ali Carter** (ENG) (3) 5–3 Dave Harold (ENG)
  - **Mark Selby** (ENG) (8) 5–2 Mei Xiwen (CHN)
  - **Jamie Cope** (ENG) (16) 5–3 Steve Davis (ENG)
  - **Ding Junhui** (CHN) (4) 5–4 Jin Long (CHN)
  - **Shaun Murphy** (ENG) (6) 5–3 Stephen Lee (ENG)
  - Stephen Hendry (SCO) (10) 2–5 **Martin Gould** (ENG)
  - **Mark King** (ENG) (14) 5–3 Joe Delaney (IRL)

==== Tennis ====
- Grand Slams:
  - US Open in New York City, United States, day 10:
    - Men's singles, quarterfinals:
      - **Roger Federer** (SUI) [2] def. Robin Söderling (SWE) [5] 6–4, 6–4, 7–5
      - **Novak Djokovic** (SRB) [3] def. Gaël Monfils (FRA) [17] 7–6(2), 6–1, 6–2
    - Women's singles, quarterfinals:
      - **Caroline Wozniacki** (DEN) [1] def. Dominika Cibulková (SVK) 6–2, 7–5
      - **Vera Zvonareva** (RUS) [7] def. Kaia Kanepi (EST) [31] 6–3, 7–5

==== Water polo ====
- Women's European Championship in Zagreb, Croatia:
  - Semifinals:
    - Italy 5–10 **Greece**
    - **Russia** 10–7 Netherlands
  - 5th place playoff: **Hungary** 10–7 Spain

==== Wrestling ====
- World Championships in Moscow, Russia:
  - Men's Greco-Roman 74 kg: (gold) Selçuk Çebi (TUR) (silver) Arsen Julfalakyan (ARM) (bronze) Imil Sharafetdinov (RUS) and Daniar Kobonov (KGZ)
  - Women's freestyle 48 kg: (gold) Hitomi Sakamoto (JPN) (silver) Larisa Oorzhak (RUS) (bronze) Zhao Shasha (CHN) and Carol Huynh (CAN)
  - Women's freestyle 51 kg: (gold) Oleksandra Kohut (UKR) (silver) Yu Horiuchi (JPN) (bronze) Sofia Mattsson (SWE) and Zamira Rakhmanova (RUS)

=== September 7, 2010 (Tuesday) ===
==== Basketball ====
- FIBA World Championship in Istanbul, Turkey:
  - Eighth–finals:
    - **Lithuania** 78–67 China
    - **Argentina** 93–89 Brazil
- WNBA Playoffs:
  - Eastern Conference Finals, Game 2: (4) Atlanta Dream 105, (2) New York Liberty 93. **Dream win series 2–0.**

==== Cricket ====
- Pakistan in England:
  - 2nd T20I in Cardiff: Pakistan 89 (18.4 overs); England 90/4 (14 overs). **England win by 6 wickets; win 2-match series 2–0.**
- Ireland in Canada:
  - 2nd ODI in Toronto: Ireland 325/8 (50 overs; Paul Stirling 177); Canada 233 (46.3 overs; Albert van der Merwe 5/49). **Ireland win by 92 runs; 2-match series drawn 1–1.**

==== Cycling ====
- Grand Tours:
  - Vuelta a España:
    - Stage 10: (gold) Imanol Erviti (ESP) (Caisse d'Epargne) 4h 13' 31" (silver) Romain Zingle (BEL) (Cofidis) + 37" (bronze) Greg Van Avermaet (BEL) (Omega Pharma–Lotto) + 37"
      - General classification: (1) Joaquim Rodríguez (ESP) (Team Katusha) 42h 11' 49" (2) Igor Antón (ESP) (Euskaltel–Euskadi) + 2" (3) Vincenzo Nibali (ITA) (Liquigas–Doimo) + 4"

==== Field hockey ====
- Women's World Cup in Rosario, Argentina: (teams in **bold** advance to the semifinals)
  - Pool A:
    - New Zealand 3–0 India
    - **Netherlands** 5–2 Japan
    - Australia 0–1 **Germany**
      - Final standings: Netherlands 15 points, Germany 12, Australia 9, New Zealand 4, India 3, Japan 1.

==== Football (soccer) ====
- UEFA Euro 2012 qualifying:
  - Group A:
    - Turkey 3–2 Belgium
    - Austria 2–0 Kazakhstan
    - Germany 6–1 Azerbaijan
      - Standings: Germany, Turkey 6 points (2 matches), Austria 3 (1), Belgium 0 (2), Azerbaijan 0 (1), Kazakhstan 0 (2).
  - Group B:
    - Russia 0–1 Slovakia
    - North Macedonia 2–2 Armenia
    - Republic of Ireland 3–1 Andorra
      - Standings (after 2 matches): Republic of Ireland, Slovakia 6 points, Russia 3, Armenia, Macedonia 1, Andorra 0.
  - Group C:
    - Serbia 1–1 Slovenia
    - Italy 5–0 Faroe Islands
      - Standings: Italy 6 points (2 matches), Serbia 4 (2), Northern Ireland 3 (1), Estonia 3 (2), Slovenia 1 (2), Faroe Islands 0 (3).
  - Group D:
    - Belarus 0–0 Romania
    - Albania 1–0 Luxembourg
    - Bosnia and Herzegovina 0–2 France
      - Standings (after 2 matches): Albania, Belarus 4 points, France, Bosnia and Herzegovina 3, Romania 2, Luxembourg 0.
  - Group E:
    - Sweden 6–0 San Marino
    - Hungary 2–1 Moldova
    - Netherlands 2–1 Finland
      - Standings (after 2 matches): Sweden, Netherlands 6 points, Hungary, Moldova 3, Finland, San Marino 0.
  - Group F:
    - Georgia 0–0 Israel
    - Malta 0–2 Latvia
    - Croatia 0–0 Greece
      - Standings (after 2 matches): Croatia, Israel 4 points, Latvia 3, Georgia, Greece 2, Malta 0.
  - Group G:
    - Bulgaria 0–1 Montenegro
    - Switzerland 1–3 England
      - Standings: England, Montenegro 6 points (2 matches), Wales, Switzerland 0 (1), Bulgaria 0 (2).
  - Group H:
    - Denmark 1–0 Iceland
    - Norway 1–0 Portugal
      - Standings: Norway 6 points (2 matches), Denmark 3 (1), Cyprus 1 (1), Portugal 1 (2), Iceland 0 (2).
  - Group I:
    - Czech Republic 0–1 Lithuania
    - Scotland 2–1 Liechtenstein
      - Standings: Scotland, Lithuania 4 points (2 matches), Spain 3 (1), Czech Republic 0 (1), Liechtenstein 0 (2).
- Friendly international match: Argentina 4–1 Spain
- 2011 European Under-21 Championship qualification: (teams in **bold** advance to the playoffs)
  - Group 1:
    - Russia 0–0 **Romania**
    - Latvia 1–1 Moldova
      - Final standings: Romania 25 points, Russia 22, Moldova 14, Latvia 13, Faroe Islands 11, Andorra 1.
  - Group 2:
    - Georgia 0–2 Armenia
    - Turkey 1–0 Republic of Ireland
      - Final standings: **Switzerland** 20 points, Turkey 16, Georgia 15, Armenia 13, Estonia 12, Republic of Ireland 7.
  - Group 3:
    - **Italy** 1–0 Wales
    - Hungary 0–0 Bosnia and Herzegovina
      - Final standings: Italy, Wales 16 points, Hungary 13, Bosnia and Herzegovina 8, Luxembourg 4.
  - Group 4:
    - Poland 0–1 **Spain**
    - Finland 3–0 Liechtenstein
      - Final standings: **Netherlands** 21 points, Spain 19, Finland 10, Poland 9, Liechtenstein 0.
  - Group 5:
    - Germany 3–0 Northern Ireland
    - **Czech Republic** 3–1 **Iceland**
      - Final standings: Czech Republic 22 points, Iceland 16, Germany 12, Northern Ireland 7, San Marino 0.
  - Group 6:
    - Israel 5–0 Montenegro
    - Bulgaria 0–1 **Sweden**
      - Final standings: Sweden 19 points, Israel 16, Montenegro 13, Kazakhstan 5, Bulgaria 4.
  - Group 7:
    - Slovakia 1–4 Norway
    - Cyprus 1–3 Serbia
      - Final standings: **Croatia** 17 points, Slovakia 14, Serbia 13, Norway 7, Cyprus 6.
  - Group 8:
    - France 2–0 Malta
    - **Ukraine** 0–0 Slovenia
      - Final standings: Ukraine 16 points, Belgium, France 15, Slovenia 8, Malta 0.
  - Group 9:
    - **England** 3–0 Lithuania
    - Portugal 3–1 North Macedonia
      - Final standings: **Greece** 19 points, England 17, Portugal 13, Lithuania 5, Macedonia 2.
  - Group 10:
    - **Scotland** 2–1 Austria
    - **Belarus** 1–0 Azerbaijan
      - Final standings: Scotland, Belarus 17 points, Austria 14, Albania, Azerbaijan 4.
- Copa Sudamericana second stage, first leg:
  - Atlético Huila (Colombia) 1–1 (Bolivia) San Jose
  - Guaraní (Paraguay) 1–1 (Chile) Unión San Felipe

==== Golf ====
- Ryder Cup:
  - United States team captain Corey Pavin selects Tiger Woods, Stewart Cink, Zach Johnson and Rickie Fowler as his four wildcard picks.

==== Snooker ====
- Shanghai Masters, First round:
  - Liang Wenbo (CHN) (15) 3–5 **Matthew Stevens** (WAL)
  - **Stephen Maguire** (SCO) (5) 5–3 Judd Trump (ENG)
  - **Graeme Dott** (SCO) (12) 5–4 Ken Doherty (IRL)
  - Mark Allen (NIR) (9) 2–5 **Stuart Bingham** (ENG)
  - **Jamie Burnett** (SCO) def. Ronnie O'Sullivan (ENG) (1) walkover
  - Marco Fu (HKG) (13) 4–5 **Mark Davis** (ENG)
  - **Mark Williams** (WAL) (7) 5–3 Ricky Walden (ENG)
  - Ryan Day (WAL) (11) 3–5 **Andrew Higginson** (ENG)

==== Tennis ====
- Grand Slams:
  - US Open in New York City, United States, day 9:
    - Men's singles, fourth round:
      - **Rafael Nadal** (ESP) [1] def. Feliciano López (ESP) [23] 6–3, 6–4, 6–4
      - **Fernando Verdasco** (ESP) [8] def. David Ferrer (ESP) [10] 5–7, 6–7(8), 6–3, 6–3, 7–6(4)
      - **Mikhail Youzhny** (RUS) [12] def. Tommy Robredo (ESP) 7–5, 6–2, 4–6, 6–4
      - **Stanislas Wawrinka** (SUI) [25] def. Sam Querrey (USA) [20] 7–6(9), 6–7(5), 7–5, 4–6, 6–4
    - Women's singles, quarterfinals:
      - **Kim Clijsters** (BEL) [2] def. Samantha Stosur (AUS) [5] 6–4, 5–7, 6–3
      - **Venus Williams** (USA) [3] def. Francesca Schiavone (ITA) [6] 7–6(5), 6–4

==== Water polo ====
- Men's European Championship in Zagreb, Croatia:
  - Quarterfinals:
    - **Italy** 6–2 Germany
    - Montenegro 5–6 **Serbia**
  - 7th–12th Quarterfinals:
    - **Spain** 9–6 Russia
    - **Turkey** 9–6 North Macedonia

==== Wrestling ====
- World Championships in Moscow, Russia:
  - Men's Greco-Roman 60 kg: (gold) Hasan Aliyev (AZE) (silver) Ryutaro Matsumoto (JPN) (bronze) Almat Kebispayev (KAZ) and Jung Ji-Hyun (KOR)
  - Men's Greco-Roman 84 kg: (gold) Hristo Marinov (BUL) (silver) Pablo Shorey (CUB) (bronze) Aleksey Mishin (RUS) and Nenad Žugaj (CRO)
  - Men's Greco-Roman 120 kg: (gold) Mijaín López (CUB) (silver) Yuri Patrikeyev (ARM) (bronze) Nurmakhan Tinaliyev (KAZ) and Rıza Kayaalp (TUR)

=== September 6, 2010 (Monday) ===
==== American football ====
- NCAA:
  - AP Top 10: (3) Boise State 33, (10) Virginia Tech 30 in Landover, Maryland
  - Played earlier this week: (1) Alabama, (2) Ohio State, (4) Florida, (5) Texas, (6) TCU, (7) Oklahoma, (8) Nebraska, (9) Iowa

==== Basketball ====
- FIBA World Championship in Istanbul, Turkey:
  - Eighth–finals:
    - **United States** 121–66 Angola
    - **Russia** 78–56 New Zealand

==== Cricket ====
- Ireland in Canada:
  - 1st ODI in Toronto: Ireland 175/9 (35/35 overs); Canada 163/4 (33/33 overs). **Canada win by 4 runs (D/L); lead 2-match series 1–0.**

==== Field hockey ====
- Women's World Cup in Rosario, Argentina: (teams in **bold** advance to the semi-finals)
  - Pool B:
    - Spain 0–6 China
    - South Korea 5–3 South Africa
    - **Argentina** 2–0 **England**
      - Final standings: Argentina 15 points, England 10, Korea 8, China 6, South Africa 3, Spain 1.

==== Football (soccer) ====
- FIFA U-17 Women's World Cup in Trinidad and Tobago:
  - Group C:
    - Spain 4–1 Japan
    - New Zealand 1–2 Venezuela
  - Group D:
    - Republic of Ireland 1–2 Brazil
    - Canada 1–0 Ghana

==== Golf ====
- PGA Tour:
  - FedEx Cup Playoffs: Deutsche Bank Championship in Norton, Massachusetts:
    - Winner: Charley Hoffman (USA) 262 (−22)
      - Hoffman wins his second PGA Tour title.

==== Snooker ====
- Shanghai Masters, Wildcard round:
  - **Jamie Burnett** (SCO) 5–2 Tian Pengfei (CHN)
  - **Andrew Higginson** (ENG) 5–2 Rouzi Maimaiti (CHN)
  - **Ken Doherty** (IRL) 5–4 Mohammad Sajjad (PAK)
  - Robert Milkins (ENG) 3–5 **Jin Long** (CHN)
  - **Dave Harold** (ENG) 5–1 Passakorn Suwannawat (THA)
  - Mike Dunn (ENG) 1–5 **Mei Xiwen** (CHN)
  - **Martin Gould** (ENG) 5–3 Li Hang (CHN)
  - **Joe Delaney** (IRL) 5–1 Li Yan (CHN)

==== Tennis ====
- Grand Slams:
  - US Open in New York City, United States, day 8:
    - Men's singles, fourth round:
      - **Roger Federer** (SUI) [2] def. Jürgen Melzer (AUT) [13] 6–3, 7–6(4), 6–3
      - **Novak Djokovic** (SRB) [3] def. Mardy Fish (USA) [11] 6–3, 6–4, 6–1
      - **Robin Söderling** (SWE) [5] def. Albert Montañés (ESP) [21] 4–6, 6–3, 6–2, 6–3
      - **Gaël Monfils** (FRA) [17] def. Richard Gasquet (FRA) 6–4, 7–5, 7–5
    - Women's singles, fourth round:
      - **Caroline Wozniacki** (DEN) [1] def. Maria Sharapova (RUS) [14] 6–3, 6–4
      - **Vera Zvonareva** (RUS) [7] def. Andrea Petkovic (GER) 6–1, 6–2
      - **Dominika Cibulková** (SVK) def. Svetlana Kuznetsova (RUS) [11] 7–5, 7–6(4)
      - **Kaia Kanepi** (EST) [31] def. Yanina Wickmayer (BEL) [15] 0–6, 7–6(2), 6–1

==== Water polo ====
- Women's European Championship in Zagreb, Croatia:
  - Quarterfinals:
    - **Russia** 12–9 Hungary
    - Spain 9–10 **Italy**
  - 7th place playoff: Croatia 7–23 **Germany**

==== Wrestling ====
- World Championships in Moscow, Russia:
  - Men's Greco-Roman 55 kg: (gold) Hamid Sourian (IRN) (silver) Choi Gyu-Jin (KOR) (bronze) Nazyr Mankiev (RUS) and Roman Amoyan (ARM)
  - Men's Greco-Roman 66 kg: (gold) Ambako Vachadze (RUS) (silver) Armen Vardanyan (UKR) (bronze) Vasıf Arzımanov (TUR) and Vitaliy Rahimov (AZE)
  - Men's Greco-Roman 96 kg: (gold) Amir Ali-Akbari (IRN) (silver) Tsimafei Dzeinichenka (BLR) (bronze) Aslanbek Khushtov (RUS) and Jimmy Lidberg (SWE)

=== September 5, 2010 (Sunday) ===
==== Australian rules football ====
- AFL finals series:
  - Second Elimination Final in Perth: **Fremantle** 14.10 (94)–8.16 (64) Hawthorn

==== Auto racing ====
- NASCAR Sprint Cup Series:
  - Emory Healthcare 500 in Hampton, Georgia: (1) (Indiana) Tony Stewart (Chevrolet, Stewart Haas Racing) (2) (Missouri) Carl Edwards (Ford, Roush Fenway Racing) (3) (California) Jimmie Johnson (Chevrolet, Hendrick Motorsports)
    - Drivers' championship standings (after 25 of 26 races leading to the Chase for the Sprint Cup): (1) (California) Kevin Harvick (Chevrolet; Richard Childress Racing) 3585 points (2) (California) Jeff Gordon (Chevrolet; Hendrick Motorsports) 3366 (3) (Nevada) Kyle Busch (Toyota; Joe Gibbs Racing) 3325
    - Eight more drivers clinch spots in the Chase: Kyle Busch, Stewart, Edwards, Jeff Burton, Johnson, Kurt Busch, Matt Kenseth, and Denny Hamlin.
- World Touring Car Championship:
  - Race of Germany:
    - Round 15: (1) Alain Menu (SUI) (Chevrolet; Chevrolet Cruze) (2) Augusto Farfus (BRA) (BMW Team RBM; BMW 320si) (3) Yvan Muller (FRA) (Chevrolet; Chevrolet Cruze)
    - Round 16: (1) Andy Priaulx (GBR) (BMW Team RBM; BMW 320si) (2) Farfus (3) Muller
      - Drivers' championship standings (after 16 of 22 rounds): (1) Muller 229 points (2) Priaulx 216 (3) Gabriele Tarquini (ITA) (SR-Sport; SEAT León) 196
      - Manufacturers' championship standings: (1) Chevrolet 508 points (2) BMW 451 (3) SEAT Customers Technology 449

==== Basketball ====
- FIBA World Championship in Istanbul, Turkey:
  - Eighth–finals:
    - **Slovenia** 87–58 Australia
    - **Turkey** 95–77 France
- WNBA Playoffs:
  - Eastern Conference Finals, Game 1: (4) Atlanta Dream 81, (2) New York Liberty 75. Dream lead series 1–0.
  - Western Conference Finals, Game 2: (1) Seattle Storm 91, (2) Phoenix Mercury 88. **Storm win series 2–0.**

==== Cricket ====
- Pakistan in England:
  - 1st T20I in Cardiff: Pakistan 126/4 (20 overs); England 129/5 (17.1 overs). **England win by 5 wickets; lead 2-match series 1–0.**

==== Cycling ====
- Grand Tours:
  - Vuelta a España:
    - Stage 9: (gold) David López (ESP) (Caisse d'Epargne) 5h 20' 51" (silver) Roman Kreuziger (CZE) (Liquigas–Doimo) + 6" (bronze) Giampaolo Caruso (ITA) (Team Katusha) + 13"
      - General classification: (1) Igor Antón (ESP) (Euskaltel–Euskadi) 37h 56' 42" (2) Joaquim Rodríguez (ESP) (Team Katusha) + 0" (3) Vincenzo Nibali (ITA) (Liquigas–Doimo) + 2"

==== Field hockey ====
- Women's World Cup in Rosario, Argentina: (teams in **bold** advance to the semifinals)
  - Pool A:
    - Japan 0–2 India
    - Germany 1–2 **Netherlands**
    - New Zealand 1–4 Australia
      - Standings (after 4 games): Netherlands 12 points, Germany, Australia 9, India 3, Japan, New Zealand 1.

==== Football (soccer) ====
- FIFA U-17 Women's World Cup in Trinidad and Tobago:
  - Group A:
    - Nigeria 3–2 North Korea
    - Trinidad and Tobago 2–1 Chile
  - Group B:
    - Germany 9–0 Mexico
    - South Africa 1–3 South Korea
- 2012 Africa Cup of Nations qualification, matchday 1:
  - Group A: Liberia 1–1 Zimbabwe
  - Group B:
    - Ethiopia 1–4 Guinea
    - Nigeria 2–0 Madagascar
  - Group C:
    - Mozambique 0–0 Libya
    - Zambia 4–0 Comoros
  - Group E: DR Congo 2–4 Senegal
  - Group G: Egypt 1–1 Sierra Leone
  - Group H: Benin 1–1 Burundi
  - Group I: Swaziland 0–3 Ghana

==== Golf ====
- European Tour:
  - Omega European Masters in Crans-Montana, Switzerland:
    - Winner: Miguel Ángel Jiménez (ESP) 263 (−21)
      - Jiménez wins his third European Tour title of the season and 18th of his career.
- Champions Tour:
  - Home Care & Hospice First Tee Open at Pebble Beach in Pebble Beach, California:
    - Winner: Ted Schulz (USA) 202 (−14)
      - Schulz wins for the first time on the senior circuit.

==== Hurling ====
- All-Ireland Senior Championship Final in Dublin:
  - Kilkenny 1-18–**4-17** **Tipperary**
    - Tipperary win their 26th All-Ireland hurling title and their first since 2001. In the process, they prevent Kilkenny from winning a fifth straight All-Ireland title.

==== Motorcycle racing ====
- Moto GP:
  - San Marino and Rimini's Coast motorcycle Grand Prix in Misano Adriatico, Italy:
    - MotoGP: (1) Dani Pedrosa (ESP) (Honda) (2) Jorge Lorenzo (ESP) (Yamaha) (3) Valentino Rossi (ITA) (Yamaha)
      - Riders' championship standings (after 12 of 18 rounds): (1) Lorenzo 271 points (2) Pedrosa 208 (3) Andrea Dovizioso (ITA) (Honda) 139
      - Manufacturers' championship standings: (1) Yamaha 280 points (2) Honda 245 (3) Ducati 170
    - Moto2: (1) Toni Elías (ESP) (Moriwaki) (2) Julián Simón (ESP) (Suter) (3) Thomas Lüthi (SUI) (Moriwaki)
      - Riders' championship standings (after 11 of 17 rounds): (1) Elías 211 points (2) Simón 128 (3) Lüthi 124
      - Manufacturers' championship standings: (1) Moriwaki 236 points (2) Suter 196 (3) Speed Up 144
      - Shoya Tomizawa is fatally injured in a crash during the race. He is the first rider killed in a Grand Prix race since Daijiro Kato at the 2003 Japanese Grand Prix. (BBC Sport)
    - 125cc: (1) Marc Márquez (ESP) (Derbi) (2) Nicolás Terol (ESP) (Aprilia) (3) Efrén Vázquez (ESP) (Derbi)
      - Riders' championship standings (after 11 of 17 rounds): (1) Márquez 197 points (2) Terol 188 (3) Pol Espargaró (ESP) (Derbi) 177
      - Manufacturers' championship standings: (1) Derbi 260 points (2) Aprilia 231 (3) Honda 14
- Superbike:
  - Nürburgring Superbike World Championship round in Nürburg, Germany:
    - Race 1: (1) Jonathan Rea (GBR) (Honda CBR1000RR) (2) Carlos Checa (ESP) (Ducati 1098R) (3) Cal Crutchlow (GBR) (Yamaha YZF-R1)
    - Race 2: (1) Noriyuki Haga (JPN) (Ducati 1098R) (2) Rea (3) Leon Haslam (GBR) (Suzuki GSX-R1000)
      - Riders' championship standings (after 11 of 13 rounds): (1) Max Biaggi (ITA) (Aprilia RSV 4) 397 points (2) Haslam 339 (3) Rea 288
      - Manufacturers' championship standings: (1) Aprilia 409 points (2) Suzuki 360 (3) Ducati 342
- Supersport:
  - Nürburgring Supersport World Championship round in Nürburg, Germany: (1) Eugene Laverty (IRL) (Honda CBR600RR) (2) Kenan Sofuoğlu (TUR) (Honda CBR600RR) (3) Broc Parkes (AUS) (Kawasaki Ninja ZX-6R)
    - Riders' championship standings (after 11 of 13 rounds): (1) Sofuoğlu 223 points (2) Laverty 211 (3) Joan Lascorz (ESP) (Kawasaki Ninja ZX-6R) 168
    - Manufacturers' championship standings: (1) Honda 270 points (2) Kawasaki 188 (3) Triumph 147

==== Rugby union ====
- Women's World Cup in England:
  - 11th place match: **Kazakhstan** 12–8 Sweden
  - 9th place match: South Africa 17–29 **Wales**
  - 7th place match: Scotland 8–32 **Ireland**
  - 5th place match: Canada 20–23 **United States**
  - 3rd place match: France 8–22 (bronze) **Australia**
  - Final: (gold) **New Zealand** 13–10 (silver) England
    - New Zealand win the Cup for the fourth successive time.

==== Tennis ====
- Grand Slams:
  - US Open in New York City, United States, day 7:
    - Men's singles, third round:
      - **Rafael Nadal** (ESP) [1] def. Gilles Simon (FRA) 6–4, 6–4, 6–2
      - **Stanislas Wawrinka** (SUI) [25] def. Andy Murray (GBR) [4] 6–7(3), 7–6(4), 6–3, 6–3
      - **Fernando Verdasco** (ESP) [8] def. David Nalbandian (ARG) [31] 6–2, 3–6, 6–3, 6–2
      - **David Ferrer** (ESP) [10] def. Daniel Gimeno Traver (ESP) 7–6(2), 6–2, 6–2
    - Women's singles, fourth round:
      - **Kim Clijsters** (BEL) [2] def. Ana Ivanovic (SRB) 6–2, 6–1
      - **Venus Williams** (USA) [3] def. Shahar Pe'er (ISR) [16] 7–6(3), 6–3
      - **Samantha Stosur** (AUS) [5] def. Elena Dementieva (RUS) [12] 6–3, 2–6, 7–6(2)
      - **Francesca Schiavone** (ITA) [6] def. Anastasia Pavlyuchenkova (RUS) [20] 6–3, 6–0

==== Water polo ====
- Men's European Championship in Zagreb, Croatia: (teams in **bold** advance to the semifinals, teams in italics advance to the quarterfinals)
  - Group A:
    - Turkey 6–12 Spain
    - Romania 9–9 Montenegro
    - Italy 5–8 **Croatia**
      - Final standings: Croatia, Italy 12 points, Montenegro 10, Romania 7, Spain 3, Turkey 0.
  - Group B:
    - Serbia 17–3 Germany
    - Russia 7–6 Greece
    - **Hungary** 7–4 North Macedonia
      - Final standings: Hungary 13 points, Serbia 12, Germany 9, Greece 4, Macedonia, Russia 3.

=== September 4, 2010 (Saturday) ===
==== American football ====
- NCAA:
  - AP Top 10:
    - (1) Alabama 48, San Jose State 3
    - (4) Florida 34, Miami (OH) 12
    - (5) Texas 34, Rice 17
    - (6) TCU 30, (24) Oregon State 21 in Arlington, Texas
    - (7) Oklahoma 31, Utah State 24
    - (8) Nebraska 49, Western Kentucky 10
    - (9) Iowa 37, Eastern Illinois 7
  - Other games:
    - (21) LSU 30, (18) North Carolina 24 in Atlanta
  - Played earlier this week: (2) Ohio State
  - Play later this week: (3) Boise State, (10) Virginia Tech

==== Australian rules football ====
- AFL finals series:
  - First Qualifying Final in Melbourne: **Collingwood** 17.22 (124)–8.14 (62) Western Bulldogs
  - First Elimination Final in Sydney: **Sydney** 14.15 (99)–13.16 (94) Carlton

==== Auto racing ====
- Nationwide Series:
  - Great Clips 300 in Hampton, Georgia: (1) (Missouri) Jamie McMurray (Chevrolet; JR Motorsports) (2) (Nevada) Kyle Busch (Toyota; Joe Gibbs Racing) (3) (Missouri) Carl Edwards (Ford; Roush Fenway Racing)
    - Drivers' championship standings (after 26 of 35 races): (1) (Michigan) Brad Keselowski (Dodge; Penske Racing) 4127 points (2) Edwards 3795 (3) Busch 3576
- IndyCar Series:
  - Kentucky Indy 300 in Sparta, Kentucky: (1) Hélio Castroneves (BRA) (Team Penske) (2) Ed Carpenter (USA) (Panther Racing) (3) Dan Wheldon (GBR) (Panther Racing)
    - Drivers' championship standings (after 15 of 17 races): (1) Will Power (AUS) (Team Penske) 552 points (2) Dario Franchitti (GBR) (Chip Ganassi Racing) 535 (3) Scott Dixon (NZL) (Chip Ganassi Racing) 469

==== Basketball ====
- FIBA World Championship in Istanbul, Turkey:
  - Eighth–finals:
    - **Serbia** 73–72 Croatia
    - **Spain** 80–72 Greece

==== Cycling ====
- Grand Tours:
  - Vuelta a España:
    - Stage 8: (gold) David Moncoutié (FRA) (Cofidis) 5h 14' 32" (silver) Serafín Martínez (ESP) (Xacobeo–Galicia) + 54" (bronze) Johann Tschopp (SUI) (Bbox Bouygues Telecom) + 54"
      - General classification: (1) Igor Antón (ESP) (Euskaltel–Euskadi) 32h 28' 49" (2) Joaquim Rodríguez (ESP) (Team Katusha) + 0" (3) Vincenzo Nibali (ITA) (Liquigas–Doimo) + 2"

==== Field hockey ====
- Women's World Cup in Rosario, Argentina: (teams in **bold** advance to the semi-finals)
  - Pool B:
    - **England** 2–1 South Africa
    - South Korea 2–2 Spain
    - China 0–2 **Argentina**
      - Standings (after 4 games): Argentina 12 points, England 10, Korea 5, China, South Africa 3, Spain 1.

==== Football (soccer) ====
- 2012 Africa Cup of Nations qualification, matchday 1:
  - Group A: Cape Verde 1–0 Mali
  - Group D: Morocco 0–0 Central African Republic
  - Group E: Mauritius 1–3 Cameroon
  - Group F: Gambia 3–1 Namibia
  - Group G: South Africa 2–0 Niger
  - Group H: Ivory Coast 3–0 Rwanda
  - Group I: Sudan 2–0 Congo
  - Group J:
    - Guinea-Bissau 1–0 Kenya
    - Uganda 3–0 Angola
  - Group K:
    - Botswana 2–1 Togo
    - Tunisia 2–2 Malawi
      - Standings: Botswana 10 points (4 matches), Tunisia 4 (3), Malawi 3 (3), Togo 2 (3), Chad 1 (3)
- 2011 European Under-21 Championship qualification: (teams in **bold** advance to the playoffs, teams in ~~strike~~ are eliminated)
  - Group 1:
    - ~~Moldova~~ 1–0 ~~Faroe Islands~~
    - ~~Andorra~~ 0–1 ~~Latvia~~
      - Standings: **Romania** 24 points (9 matches), Russia 21 (9), Moldova 13 (9), Latvia 12 (9), Faroe Islands 11 (10), Andorra 1 (10).
  - Group 2: ~~Turkey~~ 0–1 Georgia
    - Standings: **Switzerland** 20 points (10 matches), Georgia 15 (9), Turkey 13 (9), ~~Estonia~~ 12 (10), ~~Armenia~~ 10 (9), ~~Republic of Ireland~~ 7 (9).
  - Group 3: Hungary 0–1 Wales
    - Standings: Wales 16 points (7 matches), Italy 13 (7), Hungary 12 (7), ~~Bosnia and Herzegovina~~ 7 (7), ~~Luxembourg~~ 4 (8).
  - Group 7: ~~Serbia~~ 2–2 **Croatia**
    - Standings: Croatia 17 points (8 matches), Slovakia 14 (7), Serbia 10 (7), ~~Cyprus~~ 6 (7), ~~Norway~~ 4 (7).
  - Group 9: ~~North Macedonia~~ 1–2 **Greece**
    - Standings: Greece 19 points (8 matches), England 14 (7), ~~Portugal~~ 10 (7), ~~Lithuania~~ 5 (7), Macedonia 2 (7).
  - Group 10: ~~Azerbaijan~~ 3–2 ~~Albania~~
    - Standings: Belarus, Austria, Scotland 14 points (7 matches), Albania 4 (8), Azerbaijan 4 (7).

==== Rugby union ====
- Tri Nations Series:
  - South Africa 39–41 Australia in Bloemfontein
    - Standings: New Zealand 23 points (5 games), Australia 10 (5), South Africa 8 (6).
    - The All Blacks have already clinched the title.

==== Tennis ====
- Grand Slams:
  - US Open in New York City, United States, day 6:
    - Men's singles, third round:
      - **Roger Federer** (SUI) [2] def. Paul-Henri Mathieu (FRA) 6–4, 6–3, 6–3
      - **Novak Djokovic** (SRB) [3] def. James Blake (USA) 6–1, 7–6(4), 6–3
      - **Robin Söderling** (SWE) [5] def. Thiemo de Bakker (NED) 6–2, 6–3, 6–3
    - Women's singles, third round:
      - **Caroline Wozniacki** (DEN) [1] def. Chan Yung-jan (TPE) 6–1, 6–0
      - **Kaia Kanepi** (EST) [31] def. Jelena Janković (SRB) [4] 6–2, 7–6(1)
      - **Vera Zvonareva** (RUS) [7] def. Alexandra Dulgheru (ROU) [25] 6–2, 7–6(2)

==== Water polo ====
- Women's European Championship in Zagreb, Croatia: (teams in **bold** advance to the semi-finals, teams in italics advance to the quarter-finals)
  - Group A:
    - Croatia 4–29 **Greece**
    - Russia 12–12 Italy
      - Final standings: Greece 7 points, Russia 5, Italy 4, Croatia 0.
  - Group B:
    - Germany 10–10 Hungary
    - Spain 7–8 **Netherlands**
      - Final standings: Netherlands, Spain 6 points, Hungary 4, Germany 1.

=== September 3, 2010 (Friday) ===
==== Australian rules football ====
- AFL finals series:
  - Second Qualifying Final in Melbourne: Geelong 11.13 (79)–12.11 (83) **St Kilda**

==== Cricket ====
- ICC Intercontinental Cup in Toronto, day 4:
  - Canada 120 (32 overs) and 316 (106.5 overs); Ireland 261 (71.5 overs) and 176/4 (41.1 overs). **Ireland win by 6 wickets.**
    - Standings: Afghanistan 77 points (5 matches), Scotland 69 (5), Zimbabwe XI 63 (4), Ireland 52 (5), Kenya 43 (5), Netherlands 15 (6), Canada 9 (6).

==== Cycling ====
- Grand Tours:
  - Vuelta a España:
    - Stage 7: (gold) Alessandro Petacchi (ITA) (Lampre–Farnese) 4h 36' 12" (silver) Mark Cavendish (GBR) (Team HTC–Columbia) s.t. (bronze) Juan José Haedo (ARG) (Team Saxo Bank) s.t.
      - General classification: (1) Philippe Gilbert (BEL) (Omega Pharma–Lotto) 27h 12' 38" (2) Igor Antón (ESP) (Euskaltel–Euskadi) + 10" (3) Joaquim Rodríguez (ESP) (Team Katusha) + 10"

==== Equestrianism ====
- Show jumping:
  - FEI Nations Cup Promotional League, Promotional League Europe:
    - FEI Nations Cup of Spain in Gijón (CSIO 5*): (gold) Belgium (Pieter Devos on Utopia van de Donkhoeve, Judy-Ann Melchior on Cha Cha Z, Dirk Demeersman on Bufero vh Panishof, Philippe Le Jeune on Boyante de Muze) (silver) Great Britain, France and Canada
      - Final standings: (1) Belgium 68 points (2) Italy 61.5 (3) Norway 41
      - Belgium move into the 2011 Meydan FEI Nations Cup.
      - Italy, Norway, Denmark, Australia, Hungary and Greece qualify for the Promotional League Final.

==== Field hockey ====
- Women's World Cup in Rosario, Argentina:
  - Pool A:
    - India 1–4 Germany
    - Australia 1–4 Netherlands
    - Japan 2–2 New Zealand
      - Standings (after 3 games): Netherlands, Germany 9 points, Australia 6, Japan, New Zealand 1, India 0.
  - Pool B:
    - South Africa 1–4 China
    - England 1–1 South Korea
    - Spain 0–4 Argentina
      - Standings (after 3 games): Argentina 9 points, England 7, Korea 4, China, South Africa 3, Spain 0.

==== Football (soccer) ====
- UEFA Euro 2012 qualifying:
  - Group A:
    - Kazakhstan 0–3 Turkey
    - Belgium 0–1 Germany
  - Group B:
    - Armenia 0–1 Republic of Ireland
    - Andorra 0–2 Russia
    - Slovakia 1–0 North Macedonia
  - Group C:
    - Faroe Islands 0–3 Serbia
    - Estonia 1–2 Italy
    - Slovenia 0–1 Northern Ireland
  - Group D:
    - Romania 1–1 Albania
    - Luxembourg 0–3 Bosnia and Herzegovina
    - France 0–1 Belarus
  - Group E:
    - Moldova 2–0 Finland
    - Sweden 2–0 Hungary
    - San Marino 0–5 Netherlands
  - Group F:
    - Greece 1–1 Georgia
    - Latvia 0–3 Croatia
  - Group G:
    - Montenegro 1–0 Wales
    - England 4–0 Bulgaria
  - Group H:
    - Iceland 1–2 Norway
    - Portugal 4–4 Cyprus
  - Group I:
    - Lithuania 0–0 Scotland
    - Liechtenstein 0–4 Spain
- 2011 European Under-21 Championship qualification: (teams in **bold** advance to the playoffs, teams in ~~strike~~ are eliminated)
  - Group 1: **Romania** 3–0 Russia
    - Standings: Romania 24 points (9 matches), Russia 21 (9), ~~Faroe Islands~~ 11 (9), ~~Moldova~~ 10 (8), ~~Latvia~~ 9 (8), ~~Andorra~~ 1 (9).
  - Group 2: **Switzerland** 1–0 ~~Republic of Ireland~~
    - Standings: Switzerland 20 points (10 matches), Turkey 13 (8), Georgia 12 (8), ~~Estonia~~ 12 (10), ~~Armenia~~ 10 (9), Republic of Ireland 7 (9).
  - Group 3: ~~Bosnia and Herzegovina~~ 0–1 Italy
    - Standings: Wales 13 points (6 matches), Italy 13 (7), Hungary 12 (6), Bosnia and Herzegovina 7 (7), ~~Luxembourg~~ 4 (8).
  - Group 4: ~~Finland~~ 2–0 ~~Poland~~
    - Standings: **Netherlands** 21 points (8 matches), Spain 16 (7), Poland 9 (7), Finland 7 (7), ~~Liechtenstein~~ 0 (7).
  - Group 5:
    - ~~Northern Ireland~~ 4–0 ~~San Marino~~
    - **Czech Republic** 1–1 ~~Germany~~
      - Standings: Czech Republic 19 points (7 matches), Iceland 16 (7), Germany 9 (7), Northern Ireland 7 (7), San Marino 0 (8).
  - Group 6: Sweden 1–2 Israel
    - Standings: Sweden 16 points (7 matches), Montenegro, Israel 13 (7), ~~Kazakhstan~~ 5 (8), ~~Bulgaria~~ 4 (7).
  - Group 7: ~~Norway~~ 1–3 ~~Cyprus~~
    - Standings: Croatia 16 points (7 matches), Slovakia 14 (7), Serbia 9 (6), Cyprus 6 (7), Norway 4 (7).
  - Group 8:
    - **Ukraine** 2–2 France
    - ~~Slovenia~~ 2–2 Belgium
      - Standings: Ukraine 15 points (7 matches), Belgium 15 (8), France 12 (7), Slovenia 7 (7), ~~Malta~~ 0 (7).
  - Group 9: Portugal 0–1 England
    - Standings: Greece 16 points (7 matches), England 14 (7), Portugal 10 (7), ~~Lithuania~~ 5 (7), ~~North Macedonia~~ 2 (6).
  - Group 10: Belarus 1–1 Scotland
    - Standings: Belarus, Austria, Scotland 14 points (7 matches), ~~Albania~~ 4 (7), ~~Azerbaijan~~ 1 (6).

==== Tennis ====
- Grand Slams:
  - US Open in New York City, United States, day 5:
    - Men's singles, second round:
      - **Rafael Nadal** (ESP) [1] def. Denis Istomin (UZB) 6–2, 7–6(5), 7–5
      - **Andy Murray** (GBR) [4] def. Dustin Brown (JAM) 7–5, 6–3, 6–0
      - **Fernando Verdasco** (ESP) [8] def. Adrian Mannarino (FRA) 6–1, 6–2, 6–2
      - **David Ferrer** (ESP) [10] def. Benjamin Becker (GER) 6–3, 6–4, 6–4
    - Women's singles, third round:
      - **Kim Clijsters** (BEL) [2] def. Petra Kvitová (CZE) 6–3, 6–0
      - **Venus Williams** (USA) [3] def. Mandy Minella (LUX) 6–2, 6–1
      - **Samantha Stosur** (AUS) [5] def. Sara Errani (ITA) 6–2, 6–3
      - **Francesca Schiavone** (ITA) [6] def. Alona Bondarenko (UKR) 6–1, 7–5

==== Water polo ====
- Men's European Championship in Zagreb, Croatia:
  - Group A:
    - Montenegro 22–2 Turkey
    - Italy 10–7 Romania
    - Spain 6–8 Croatia
      - Standings (after 4 games): Italy 12 points, Montenegro, Croatia 9, Romania 6, Spain, Turkey 0.
  - Group B:
    - Serbia 19–9 North Macedonia
    - Hungary 14–10 Russia
    - Greece 5–6 Germany
      - Standings (after 4 games): Hungary 10 points, Serbia, Germany 9, Greece 4, Macedonia 3, Russia 0.

=== September 2, 2010 (Thursday) ===
==== American football ====
- NCAA:
  - AP Top 10: (2) Ohio State 45, Marshall 7
  - Other games: Utah 27, (15) Pittsburgh 24 (OT)

==== Basketball ====
- FIBA World Championship in Turkey: (teams in **bold** advance to the knockout stage)
  - Group A in Kayseri:
    - **Angola** 55–76 **Australia**
    - **Argentina** 82–84 **Serbia**
    - Jordan 73–91 Germany
      - Final standings: Serbia, Argentina 9 points, Australia 8, Angola, Germany 7, Jordan 5.
  - Group B in Istanbul:
    - **United States** 92–57 Tunisia
    - **Slovenia** 65–60 Iran
    - **Brazil** 92–74 **Croatia**
      - Final standings: United States 10 points, Slovenia 9, Brazil 8, Croatia 7, Iran 6, Tunisia 5.
  - Group C in Ankara:
    - Puerto Rico 79–88 Ivory Coast
    - **Greece** 69–73 **Russia**
    - **Turkey** 87–40 **China**
      - Final standings: Turkey 10 points, Russia 9, Greece 8, China, Puerto Rico, Côte d'Ivoire 6.
  - Group D in İzmir:
    - **Spain** 89–67 Canada
    - Lebanon 66–84 **Lithuania**
    - **New Zealand** 82–70 **France**
      - Final standings: Lithuania 10 points, Spain, New Zealand, France 8, Lebanon 6, Canada 5.
- WNBA Playoffs:
  - Western Conference Finals, Game 1: (1) Seattle Storm 82, (2) Phoenix Mercury 74. Storm lead series 1–0.

==== Cricket ====
- ICC Intercontinental Cup in Toronto, day 3:
  - Canada 120 (32 overs) and 316 (106.5 overs; Kevin O'Brien 5/39); Ireland 261 (71.5 overs) and 124/4 (29 overs). Ireland require another 52 runs with 6 wickets remaining.

==== Cycling ====
- Grand Tours:
  - Vuelta a España:
    - Stage 6: (gold) Thor Hushovd (NOR) (Cervélo TestTeam) 3h 36' 20" (silver) Daniele Bennati (ITA) (Liquigas–Doimo) s.t. (bronze) Grega Bole (SLO) (Lampre–Farnese) s.t.
      - General classification: (1) Philippe Gilbert (BEL) (Omega Pharma–Lotto) 22h 36' 26" (2) Igor Antón (ESP) (Euskaltel–Euskadi) + 10" (3) Joaquim Rodríguez (ESP) (Team Katusha) + 10"

==== Field hockey ====
- Women's World Cup in Rosario, Argentina:
  - Pool B:
    - South Africa vs. China, England vs. South Korea and Spain vs. Argentina all postponed due to inclement weather.
      - Standings (after 2 games): Argentina, England 6 points, Korea, South Africa 3, Spain, China 0.

==== Football (soccer) ====
- UEFA Euro 2012 qualifying:
  - Group F: Israel 3–1 Malta
- 2011 UEFA European Under-21 Football Championship qualification: (team in **bold** advances to the playoffs, teams in ~~strike~~ are eliminated)
  - Group 4: Spain 2–1 **Netherlands**
    - Standings: Netherlands 21 points (8 matches), Spain 16 (7), ~~Poland~~ 9 (6), ~~Finland~~ 4 (6), ~~Liechtenstein~~ 0 (7).
- Copa Sudamericana First stage, second leg: (first leg scores in parentheses)
  - Olimpia (Paraguay) 1–1 (0–2) (Uruguay) **Defensor Sporting**. Defensor Sporting win 4–1 on points.
- Copa Sudamericana second stage, first leg:
  - Vélez Sársfield (Argentina) 0–1 (Argentina) Banfield

==== Snooker ====
- Premier League Snooker – League phase in Southampton:
  - Shaun Murphy (ENG) 5–1 Ding Junhui (CHN)
  - Ronnie O'Sullivan (ENG) 3–3 Marco Fu (HKG)

==== Tennis ====
- Grand Slams:
  - US Open in New York City, United States, day 4:
    - Men's singles, second round:
      - **Roger Federer** (SUI) [2] def. Andreas Beck (GER) 6–3, 6–4, 6–3
      - **Novak Djokovic** [3] (SRB) def. Philipp Petzschner (GER) 7–5, 6–3, 7–6(6)
      - **Robin Söderling** (SWE) [5] def. Taylor Dent (USA) 6–2, 6–2, 6–4
      - **Richard Gasquet** (FRA) def. Nikolay Davydenko (RUS) [6] 6–3, 6–4, 6–2
    - Women's singles, second round:
      - **Caroline Wozniacki** (DEN) [1] def. Chang Kai-chen (TPE) 6–0, 6–0
      - **Jelena Janković** (SRB) [4] def. Mirjana Lučić (CRO) 6–4, 3–6, 6–2
      - **Vera Zvonareva** (RUS) [7] def. Sabine Lisicki (GER) 6–1, 7–6(5)
      - **Peng Shuai** (CHN) def. Agnieszka Radwańska (POL) [9] 2–6, 6–1, 6–4

==== Water polo ====
- Women's European Championship in Zagreb, Croatia:
  - Group A:
    - Greece 7–7 Russia
    - Croatia 3–22 Italy
      - Standings (after 2 games): Russia, Greece 4 points, Italy 3, Croatia 0.
  - Group B:
    - Netherlands 17–10 Germany
    - Spain 13–10 Hungary
      - Standings (after 2 games): Spain 6 points, Netherlands, Hungary 3, Germany 0.

=== September 1, 2010 (Wednesday) ===
==== Basketball ====
- FIBA World Championship in Turkey: (teams in **bold** advance to the knockout stage, teams in ~~strike~~ are eliminated)
  - Group A in Kayseri:
    - **Serbia** 94–79 **Australia**
    - ~~Germany~~ 88–92 (OT) **Angola**
    - **Argentina** 88–79 ~~Jordan~~
      - Standings (after 4 games): Argentina 8 points, Serbia 7, Australia, Angola 6, Germany 5, Jordan 4.
  - Group B in Istanbul:
    - **Croatia** 84–64 ~~Tunisia~~
    - ~~Iran~~ 51–88 **United States**
    - **Brazil** 77–80 **Slovenia**
      - Standings (after 4 games): United States 8 points, Slovenia 7, Brazil, Croatia 6, Iran 5, Tunisia 4.
  - Group C in Ankara:
    - China 80–89 **Russia**
    - Ivory Coast 60–97 **Greece**
    - **Turkey** 79–77 Puerto Rico
      - Standings (after 4 games): Turkey 8 points, Greece, Russia 7, Puerto Rico, China 5, Côte d'Ivoire 4.
  - Group D in İzmir:
    - ~~Canada~~ 61–71 **New Zealand**
    - ~~Lebanon~~ 57–91 **Spain**
    - **Lithuania** 69–55 **France**
      - Standings (after 4 games): Lithuania 8 points, France 7, Spain, New Zealand 6, Lebanon 5, Canada 4.
- WNBA Playoffs:
  - Eastern Conference First Round, Game 3: (2) New York Liberty 77, (3) Indiana Fever 74. **Liberty win series 2–1.**

==== Cricket ====
- ICC Intercontinental Cup in Toronto, day 2:
  - Canada 120 (32 overs) and 190/8 (62 overs); Ireland 261 (71.5 overs; Henry Osinde 5/68). Canada lead by 49 runs with 2 wickets remaining.

==== Cycling ====
- Grand Tours:
  - Vuelta a España:
    - Stage 5: (gold) Tyler Farrar (USA) (Garmin–Transitions) 5h 03' 36" (silver) Koldo Fernández (ESP) (Euskaltel–Euskadi) s.t. (bronze) Mark Cavendish (GBR) (Team HTC–Columbia) s.t.
      - General classification: (1) Philippe Gilbert (BEL) (Omega Pharma–Lotto) 19h 00' 06" (2) Igor Antón (ESP) (Euskaltel–Euskadi) + 10" (3) Joaquim Rodríguez (ESP) (Team Katusha) + 10"

==== Field hockey ====
- Women's World Cup in Rosario, Argentina:
  - Pool A:
    - India 3–6 Australia
    - Netherlands 7–3 New Zealand
    - Germany 2–1 Japan
      - Standings (after 2 games): Netherlands, Australia, Germany 6 points, Japan, New Zealand, India 0.

==== Football (soccer) ====
- Copa Sudamericana First stage, second leg: (first leg scores in parentheses)
  - River Plate (Uruguay) 4–2 (0–2) (Paraguay) **Guaraní**. 3–3 on points, 4–4 on aggregate; Guaraní win on away goals rule.
  - Trujillanos (Venezuela) 1–1 (1–4) (Colombia) **Atlético Huila**. Atlético Huila win 4–1 on points.

==== Rugby union ====
- Women's World Cup in England:
  - 9th–12th place:
    - **South Africa** 25–10 Kazakhstan
    - **Wales** 32–10 Sweden
  - 5th–8th place:
    - **Canada** 41–0 Scotland
    - Ireland 3–40 **United States**
  - Semi-finals:
    - **New Zealand** 45–7 France
    - **England** 15–0 Australia

==== Tennis ====
- Grand Slams:
  - US Open in New York City, United States, day 3:
    - Men's singles, first round:
      - **Andy Murray** (GBR) [4] def. Lukáš Lacko (SVK) 6–3, 6–2, 6–2
      - **Michaël Llodra** (FRA) def. Tomáš Berdych (CZE) [7] 7–6(3), 6–4, 6–4
    - Men's singles, second round: **Janko Tipsarević** (SRB) def. Andy Roddick (USA) [9] 3–6, 7–5, 6–3, 7–6(4)
    - Women's singles, second round:
      - **Kim Clijsters** (BEL) [2] def. Sally Peers (AUS) 6–2, 6–1
      - **Venus Williams** (USA) [3] def. Rebecca Marino (CAN) 7–6(3), 6–3
      - **Samantha Stosur** (AUS) [5] def. Anastasia Rodionova (AUS) 6–1, 6–4
      - **Francesca Schiavone** (ITA) [6] def. Maria Elena Camerin (ITA) 6–2, 6–1
      - **Gisela Dulko** (ARG) def. Victoria Azarenka (BLR) [10] 5–1 retired

==== Water polo ====
- Men's European Championship in Zagreb, Croatia:
  - Group A:
    - Turkey 4–9 Italy
    - Romania 7–13 Croatia
    - Montenegro 8–7 Spain
      - Standings (after 3 games): Italy 9 points, Croatia, Montenegro, Romania 6, Spain, Turkey 0.
  - Group B:
    - Russia 10–16 Serbia
    - North Macedonia 7–8 Germany
    - Hungary 6–6 Greece
      - Standings (after 3 games): Hungary 7 points, Serbia, Germany 6, Greece 4, Macedonia 3, Russia 0.
