= 2010 FIBA World Championship final =

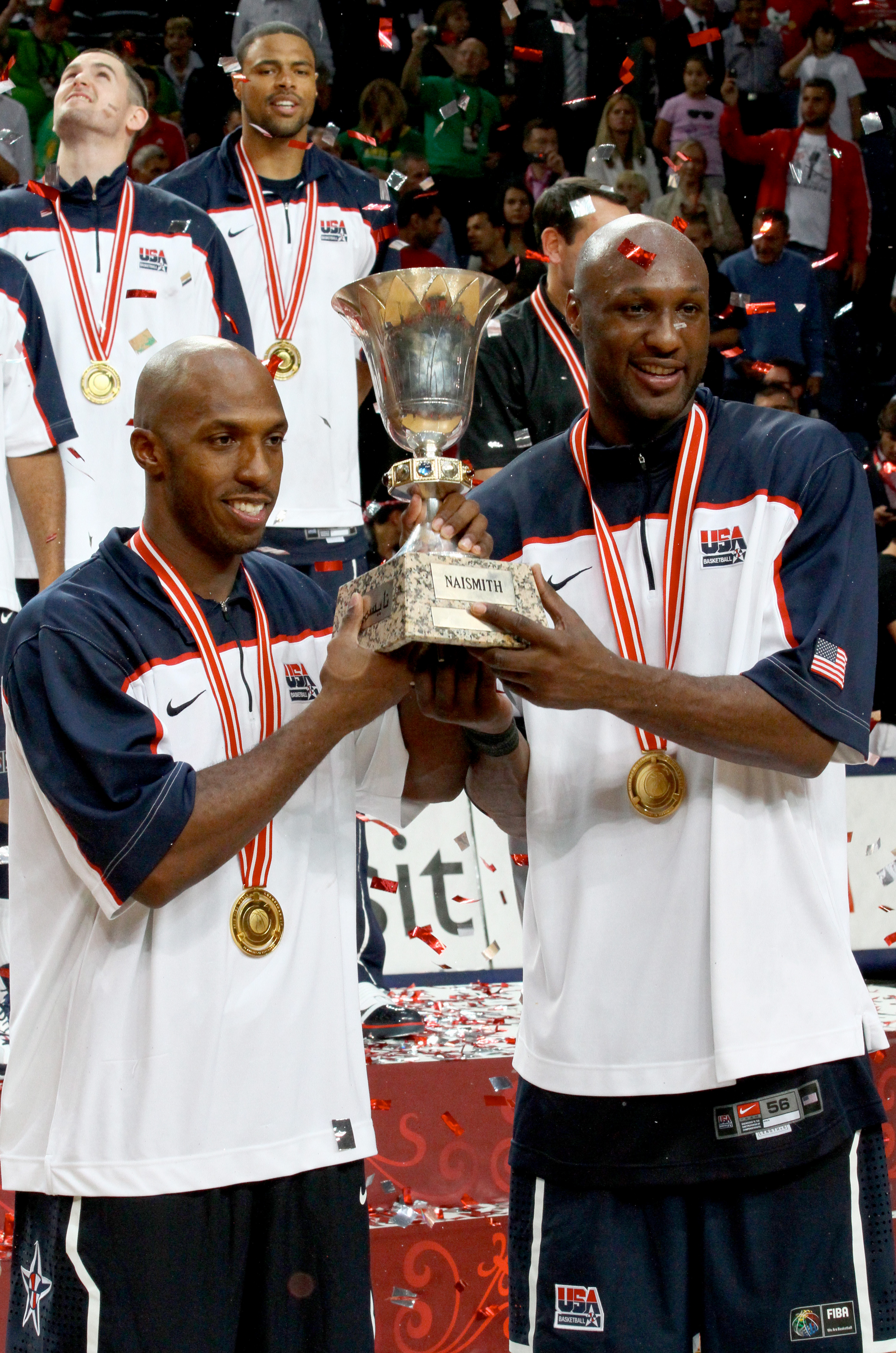
- USA's Billups and Odom holding the trophy
United States	Turkey
(United States)	(Turkey)
81	64
	1	2	3	4	Total
United States	22	20	19	20	81
Turkey	17	15	16	16	64
- Date: September 12, 2010
- Venue: Sinan Erdem Dome, Istanbul
- Referees: Cristiano Jesus Maranho, Luigi Lamonica, Juan Arteaga
- Attendance: 15,000

The 2010 FIBA World Championship final was a basketball game between the men's national teams of Turkey and the United States that took place on September 12, 2010, at Sinan Erdem Dome in Istanbul, Turkey, to determine the winner of the 2010 FIBA World Championship. The US team won the world title after defeating Turkey 81–64.

This was the first match-up in any major international competition between the United States and Turkey. The last time the two teams faced each other in a match was at an exhibition game before the 2008 Summer Olympics. At that meeting, the U.S. won 114–82.

== Route to the final ==
Both teams qualified to the tournament automatically, the United States by winning the gold medal at the Olympics in Beijing, and Turkey as hosts. Historically, the teams were polar opposites. America had 16 Summer Olympics medals and 10 FIBA World Cup medals, while Turkey's only previous international medal of any kind was a silver at the EuroBasket 2001. The US brought the top scoring offense into the final, averaging 94.3 points and 18.5 assists per game. Nevertheless, Turkey's vaunted 2–1–2 zone made it the top defensive team (64 points per game) in the tournament heading into the final, and a commentator on NBA.com wrote that the European crowd would "be the most hostile crowd most of these [U.S.] players, with the exception of maybe Chauncey Billups and Lamar Odom, have ever seen."

The U.S. had an easier route to the final, winning all of their games in runaway fashion, with the sole exception of their preliminary round game against Brazil. Turkey, on the other hand, had close games against Puerto Rico in the preliminary round, and against Serbia in the semifinals, in which Kerem Tunçeri scored the go-ahead basket, with less than a second left, after picking up Hedo Türkoğlu's fumble, to give Turkey the 83–82 win. Both teams were undefeated going into the final.

Turkey
Round
USA
Opponent
Result
Group stage
Opponent
Result
Ivory Coast
86–47
Match 1
Croatia
106–78
Russia
65–56
Match 2
Slovenia
99–77
Greece
76–65
Match 3
Brazil
70–68
Puerto Rico
79–77
Match 4
Iran
88–51
China
87–40
Match 5
Tunisia
92–57

Team	Pld	W	L	PF	PA	PD	Pts
Turkey	5	5	0	393	285	+108	10
Russia	5	4	1	365	346	+19	9
Greece	5	3	2	403	370	+33	8
China	5	1	4	360	422	−62	6
Puerto Rico	5	1	4	386	401	−15	6
Côte d'Ivoire	5	1	4	334	417	−83	6

Final standing

Team	Pld	W	L	PF	PA	PD	Pts
USA	5	5	0	455	331	+124	10
Slovenia	5	4	1	393	376	+17	9
Brazil	5	3	2	398	354	+44	8
Croatia	5	2	3	395	407	−12	7
Iran	5	1	4	301	367	−66	6
Tunisia	5	0	5	300	407	−107	5

Opponent
Result
Knockout stage
Opponent
Result
France
95–77
Round of 16
Angola
121–66
Slovenia
95–68
Quarter-finals
Russia
89–79
Serbia
83–82
Semifinals
Lithuania
89–74

== Match details ==
The game was close for the first half — Turkey even led at one point during the first quarter — but the American athleticism was too much for the Turks, and the U.S. was able to pull away on easy baskets.

Kevin Durant was the game's leading scorer, with 28 points, including seven three-point field goals. Durant scored 20 of his points in the first half. Lamar Odom came up big when it mattered most, scoring all fifteen of his points in the second half, and grabbing eleven rebounds overall. Hedo Türkoğlu was Turkey's leading scorer with 16 points, despite suffering a knee injury during the first half. Ersan İlyasova had seven points and eleven rebounds.

With the win, Mike Krzyzewski became the first U.S. national basketball head coach to win an Olympic Gold Medal and a FIBA World Cup. The U.S. also clinched an automatic berth in the 2012 Summer Olympics.

12 September
21:30

Report

Turkey	64–81	United States
Scoring by quarter: 17–22, 15–20, 16–19, 16–20
Pts: Türkoğlu 16; Rebs: İlyasova 11; Asts: Tunçeri 5		Pts: Durant 28; Rebs: Odom 11; Asts: Rose 6

Sinan Erdem Dome, Istanbul
Attendance: 15,000
Referees: Cristiano Jesus Maranho (BRA), Luigi Lamonica (ITA), Juan Arteaga (ESP)

Turkey	United States

Starters:			Pts	Reb	Ast
PG	10	Kerem Tunçeri	7	2	5
SG	7	Ömer Onan	7	0	1
SF	15	Hidayet Türkoğlu	16	7	1
PF	8	Ersan İlyasova	7	11	0
C	14	Ömer Aşık	5	4	0
Reserves:					
G	4	Cenk Akyol	0	0	0
G	5	Sinan Güler	0	0	0
G	6	Barış Ermiş	0	0	0
C	9	Semih Erden	9	0	0
C	11	Oğuz Savaş	0	2	0
F	12	Kerem Gönlüm	4	6	1
G	13	Ender Arslan	6	0	1
Head coach:
(Basketball Federation of Montenegro) Bogdan Tanjević

Game rules
Game was played under FIBA rules.

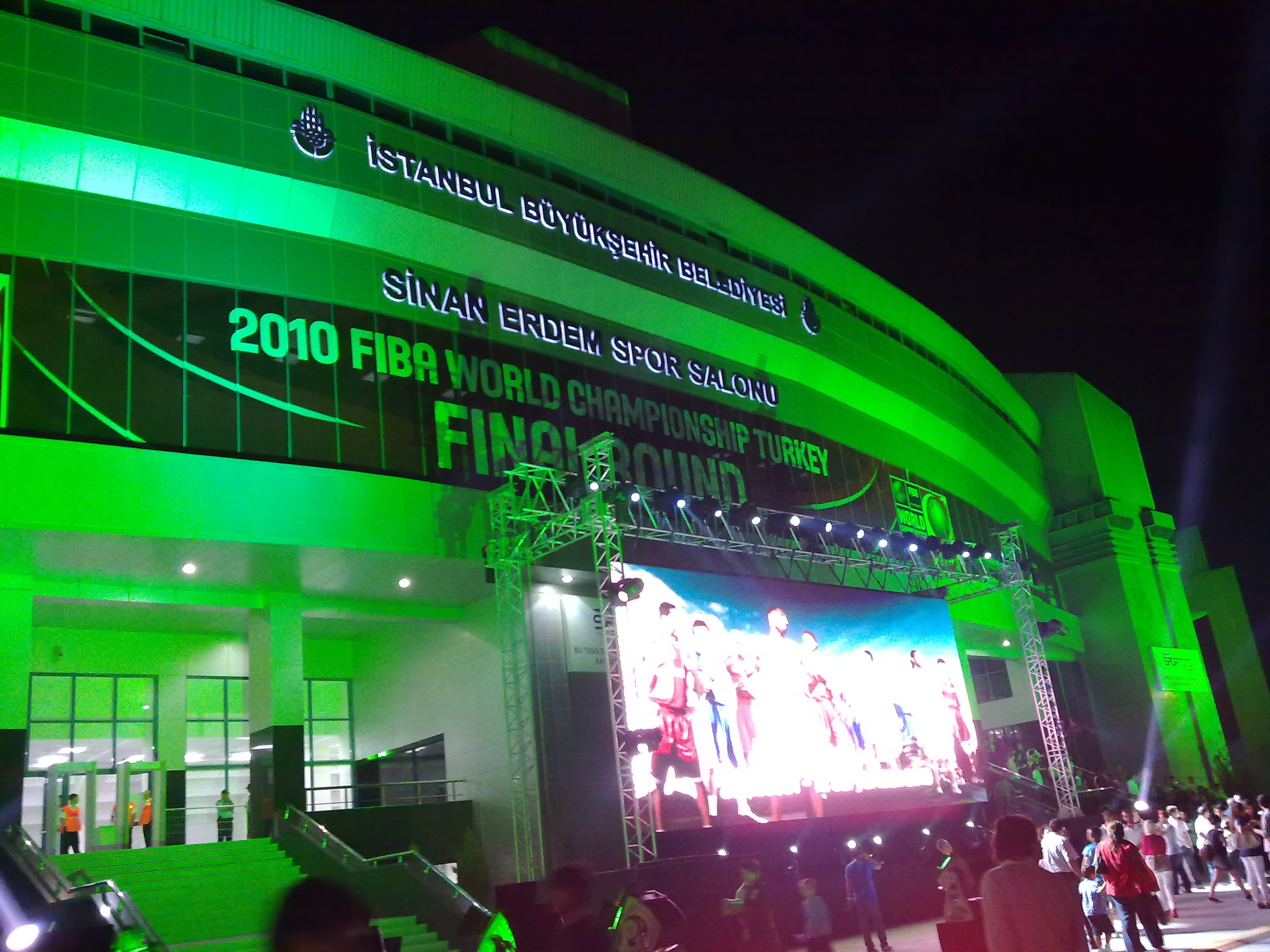
Sinan Erdem Dome

2010 World Champions

United States
4th title

Starters:			Pts	Reb	Ast
PG	4	Chauncey Billups	4	3	2
SG	6	Derrick Rose	8	1	6
SF	9	Andre Iguodala	4	5	3
PF	5	Kevin Durant	28	5	0
C	14	Lamar Odom	15	11	0
Reserves:					
G	7	Russell Westbrook	13	6	3
F	8	Rudy Gay	6	4	0
F	10	Danny Granger	0	0	0
G	11	Stephen Curry	3	0	0
G	12	Eric Gordon (injured)	DNP		
F	13	Kevin Love	0	1	0
C	15	Tyson Chandler	0	0	0
Head coach:
(USA Basketball) Mike Krzyzewski
