= 2010 FIBA World Championship Group C =

Group C of the 2010 FIBA World Championship commenced play on August 28 and ended September 2, 2010. The group played all of their games at Ankara Arena, Ankara, Turkey.

The group was composed of China, Côte d'Ivoire, Greece, Puerto Rico, wild card Russia and host country Turkey. Prior to the tournament, their average FIBA World Ranking was 16.3; excluding Côte d'Ivoire, the lowest in the rankings, it was 11.6.

The four teams with the best records – Turkey, Russia, Greece, and China – advanced to the knockout stage. Puerto Rico and Côte d'Ivoire tied with China at 1–4 overall, but were eliminated with the second tiebreaker (goal average). China was the only one of four Asian teams to qualify for the knockout stage.

== Standings ==
Pos	Team	Pld	W	L	PF	PA	PD	Pts	Qualification
1	Turkey (H)	5	5	0	393	285	+108	10	Eighth–finals
2	Russia	5	4	1	365	346	+19	9	Eighth–finals
3	Greece	5	3	2	403	370	+33	8	Eighth–finals
4	China	5	1	4	360	422	−62	6 (Note: Head-to-head record: China 1–1 (1.0127 GAvg), Puerto Rico 1–1 (0.9939 GAvg), Ivory Coast 1–1 (0.9938 GAvg))	Eighth–finals
5	Puerto Rico	5	1	4	386	401	−15	6	
6	Ivory Coast	5	1	4	334	417	−83	6	

Source: FIBA archive
Rules for classification: 1) points; 2) head-to-head points; 3) head-to-head goal average; 4) head-to-head number of points scored.
(H) Hosts
Notes:

All times local (UTC+3)

== August 28 ==
Group C action commenced on August 28. In the first game, Greece pulled away late to beat China 89–81. Sun Yue's three-pointer had put China within two, 81–79, with 3:14 left, but the Chinese were able to come no closer as Greece pulled away in the final minutes. Nikolaos Zisis and Ioannis Bourousis each scored 21 for the short-handed Greeks, which were without the services of Antonis Fotsis and Sofoklis Schortsanitis because of their two-game suspension for their roles in an exhibition match brawl against Serbia. Yi Jianlian scored a game-high 26 points in the loss for the Chinese.

Wild-cards Russia beat Puerto Rico in the day's second game. The game went back-and-forth for most of the game before the Russians used an 11–0 run to take the lead for good with 4:44 left. Sergei Monia scored 16 points for the Russians, although coach David Blatt particularly praised Anton Ponkrashov, who had a hard-fought double-double (10 points, 11 assists). The Dallas Mavericks' José Juan Barea scored a game-high 25 points for the Puerto Ricans.

In the nightcap, host Turkey cruised to an 86–47 victory over Côte d'Ivoire. Overmatched Côte d'Ivoire, making its first appearance in the World Championship since 1986, fell behind 14–0 to start the game and never mounted a challenge against the hosts. Eleven of Turkey's twelve players scored in the victory, led by Ömer Onan's 18.

=== Greece vs. China ===
August 28
16:00

Report

Greece	89–81	China
Scoring by quarter: 25–18, 22–19, 18–25, 24–19
Pts: Bourousis, Zisis 21; Rebs: Bourousis 8 Asts: Diamantidis 6		Pts: Yi J.L. 26; Rebs: Yi J.L. 14; Asts: Sun Y. 4

Ankara Arena, Ankara
Attendance: 3,880
Referees: Pablo Alberto Estevez (ARG), Ilija Belosevic (SRB), Vitalis Odhiambo Gode (KEN)

=== Russia vs. Puerto Rico ===
August 28
18:30

Report

Russia	75–66	Puerto Rico
Scoring by quarter: 14–8, 22–26, 18–21, 21–11
Pts: Monia 16; Rebs: Vorontsevich 9 Asts: Ponkrashov 11		Pts: Barea 25; Rebs: Ramos 9 Asts: Barea, Vassallo 4

Ankara Arena, Ankara
Attendance: 5,850
Referees: Carl Jungebrand (FIN), Scott Jason Butler (AUS), Cristiano Jesus Maranho (BRA)

=== Côte d'Ivoire vs. Turkey ===
August 28
21:00

Report

Ivory Coast	47–86	Turkey
Scoring by quarter: 11–23, 11–17, 14–13, 11–33
Pts: Kale 10; Rebs: Kale 9 Asts: Diabate, Lamizana, Kone 2		Pts: Onan 18; Rebs: Aşık 12; Asts: Güler 4

Ankara Arena, Ankara
Attendance: 7,726
Referees: Sasa Pukl (SLO), Fernando Rocha (POR), Marwan Egho (LIB)

== August 29 ==
On day 2, China grabbed its first victory of the tournament, beating Côte d'Ivoire 83–73. After China opened up an eight-point halftime lead, the Ivorians hung close for most of the second half but could never close the gap below seven points. Yi Jianlian scored 26 points to lead the Chinese team, while Wang Shipeng added 25 more points. Mouloukou Diabate scored 20 points, grabbed seven rebounds, and dished out three assists for Côte d'Ivoire.

In game two, Puerto Rico lost a second straight tight game, falling to Greece 83–80. The game was back-and-forth once again for the Puerto Ricans, before Greece took the lead for good on two Vassilis Spanoulis free throws with 2:38 left. Spanouilis scored a game-high 28 points for the Greeks, including a key 8-for-8 free throw shooting in the last three minutes of the game.

In the final game of the day, host Turkey again impressed, beating Russia 65–56 in a game that was not as close as the final score indicated. Turkey held Russia to a mere seven points in the second quarter to take an eleven-point halftime lead; the Russians could not cut the lead below seven points at any point in the second half. Russia struggled against Turkey's defense, shooting a meager 32 percent (17 for 53) from the field for the game.

=== China vs. Côte d'Ivoire ===
August 29
16:00

Report

China	83–73	Ivory Coast
Scoring by quarter: 21–17, 20–16, 25–18, 17–22
Pts: Yi J.L. 26; Rebs: Yi J.L. 9 Asts: Ding J.H. 4		Pts: Diabate 20; Rebs: Diabate, Abouo 7 Asts: Diabate 3

Ankara Arena, Ankara
Attendance: 2,102
Referees: Pablo Alberto Estevez (ARG), Cristiano Jesus Marahno (BRA), Vitalis Odhiambo Gode (KEN)

=== Puerto Rico vs. Greece ===
August 29
18:30

Report

Puerto Rico	80–83	Greece
Scoring by quarter: 23–21, 18–14, 15–24, 24–24
Pts: Barea 20; Rebs: Vassallo 9 Asts: Barea 4		Pts: Spanoulis 28; Rebs: Bourousis 9 Asts: Diamantidis 7

Ankara Arena, Ankara
Attendance: 5,635
Referees: Carl Jungebrand (FIN), Hector Sanchez (VEN), Fernando Rocha (POR)

=== Turkey vs. Russia ===
August 29
21:00

Report

Turkey	65–56	Russia
Scoring by quarter: 16–15, 17–7, 15–15, 17–19
Pts: Türkoğlu 14; Rebs: İlyasova 10; Asts: Tunçeri 4		Pts: Kaun, Monia 13; Rebs: Vorontsevich 9 Asts: Monia 4

Ankara Arena, Ankara
Attendance: 10,500
Referees: Sasa Pukl (SLO), Ilija Belosevic (SRB), Scott Jason Butler (AUS)

== August 30 ==
Rest day.

== August 31 ==
After a rest day, Group C returned to action on August 31. In a surprisingly close game, Russia barely escaped Côte d'Ivoire 72–66. The Ivorians pulled within two with forty seconds to play but could not come any closer as Russia won its second game of the tournament. Côte d'Ivoire dropped to 0–3 for the tournament. New York Knicks signee Timofey Mozgov scored 19 points to pace the Russians.

Puerto Rico finally got its first win of the tournament by beating China 84–76. It was a third straight tight game for the Puerto Ricans, as China hung close for most of the game. Sun Yue hit a three-pointer in the fourth quarter to cut Puerto Rico's lead to 67–64, but China could come no closer in the eight-point loss. Ángel Daniel Vassallo scored 22 points in 29 minutes of action to lead Puerto Rico to the victory.

Ankara Arena was filled to capacity long before tip-off as Turkey and Greece renewed their traditional rivalry in the final game of the night. Greece was back at full strength as Sofoklis Schortsanitis and Antonis Fotsis returned to action for the Greeks following their two-game suspensions. In the end, Turkey proved too much for the Greeks, using a 24–12 third quarter to stretch a two-point halftime lead to 14. Schortsanitis was a non-factor in his return, seeing only 13 minutes of action because of foul trouble, and the Greeks were unable to contain Turkey's big men as Ersan İlyasova, Ömer Aşık, and Semih Erden scored a combined 48 points.

=== Russia vs. Côte d'Ivoire ===
August 31
16:00

Report

Russia	72–66	Ivory Coast
Scoring by quarter: 17–12, 17–18, 19–14, 19–22
Pts: Mozgov 19; Rebs: Kaun, Khvostov 6 Asts: Monia 4		Pts: Kone 16; Rebs: Lamizana 8 Asts: Diabate, Amagou 3

Ankara Arena, Ankara
Attendance: 1,262
Referees: Ilija Belosevic (SRB), Fernando Rocha (POR), Hector Sanchez (VEN)

=== Puerto Rico vs. China ===
August 31
18:30

Report

Puerto Rico	84–76	China
Scoring by quarter: 20–21, 24–16, 19–20, 21–19
Pts: Vassallo 22; Rebs: Balkman 13; Asts: Barea 9		Pts: Yi J.L. 24; Rebs: Yi J.L. 7 Asts: Sun Y. 5

Ankara Arena, Ankara
Attendance: 3,303
Referees: Sasa Pukl (SLO), Scott Jason Butler (AUS), Marwan Egho (LIB)

=== Greece vs. Turkey ===
August 31
21:00

Report

Greece	65–76	Turkey
Scoring by quarter: 15–22, 24–19, 12–24, 14–11
Pts: Bourousis 15; Rebs: Bourousis 7 Asts: 5 tied with 1		Pts: İlyasova 26; Rebs: Türkoğlu 7 Asts: Tunçeri, Türkoğlu 2

Ankara Arena, Ankara
Attendance: 10,500
Referees: Carl Jungebrand (FIN), Pablo Alberto Estevez (ARG), Cristiano Jesus Maranho (BRA)

== September 1 ==
Heading into day 4 of group play, Russia, Greece, and Turkey each had a chance to clinch a knockout round spot with a win. All three teams took advantage, starting with Russia's 89–80 victory over China. The game featured 18 lead changes and 10 ties before Russia used a late 12–0 run to turn a 75–75 tie into an 87–75 lead with two minutes to go. Sasha Kaun scored 16 points and grabbed 14 rebounds as Russia qualified for the knockout phase just four years after failing to qualify for the 2006 FIBA World Championship.

Greece rebounded from its first loss of the tournament to steamroll Côte d'Ivoire 97–60 and qualify for the knockout phase. The Ivorians jumped out to a surprising 7–0 lead before Greece closed the first half on a 47–12 run to end any hope of an upset. All twelve players scored for Greece, led by Nick Calathes' 15 points.

The day's previous results meant that Turkey already qualified for the knockout phase; a win over Puerto Rico, however, would clinch first place in the group. Turkey did just that, narrowly defeating the Puerto Ricans 79–77 after trailing entering the fourth quarter. The hosts used an early fourth quarter run to open up a 12-point lead late in the game before Puerto Rico crawled back within one after Ángel Daniel Vassallo – who had a game-high 19 points – hit three late three-pointers. Turkey's Kerem Tunçeri hit one of two free throws with six seconds left and Vassallo's desperation three missed as Turkey hung on to win.

=== China vs. Russia ===
September 1
16:00

Report

China	80–89	Russia
Scoring by quarter: 21–15, 22–25, 19–23, 18–26
Pts: Sun Y. 19; Rebs: Yi J.L. 9 Asts: Liu W., Guo A.L. 2		Pts: Monia 17; Rebs: Kaun 14; Asts: Monia 6

Ankara Arena, Ankara
Attendance: 1,661
Referees: Carl Jungebrand (FIN), Cristiano Jesus Maranho (BRA), Hector Sanchez (VEN)

=== Côte d'Ivoire vs. Greece ===
September 1
18:30

Report

Ivory Coast	60–97	Greece
Scoring by quarter: 14–20, 5–27, 19–34, 22–16
Pts: Assie 11; Rebs: Assie 7 Asts: Diabate 6		Pts: Calathes 15; Rebs: Bourousis, Calathes 7 Asts: Calathes 8

Ankara Arena, Ankara
Attendance: 4,004
Referees: Pablo Alberto Estevez (ARG), Marwan Egho (LIB), Vitalis Odhiambo Gode (KEN)

=== Turkey vs. Puerto Rico ===
September 1
21:00

Report

Turkey	79–77	Puerto Rico
Scoring by quarter: 19–19, 11–18, 26–20, 23–20
Pts: Türkoğlu 16; Rebs: İlyasova 13; Asts: Tunçeri, Türkoğlu 5		Pts: Vassallo 19; Rebs: Ramos 12; Asts: Rivera 8

Ankara Arena, Ankara
Attendance: 10,000
Referees: Sasa Pukl (SLO), Scott Jason Butler (AUS), Ilija Belosevic (SRB)

== September 2 ==
In the final day of group play, two of the three games still held some meaning for the quarterfinals. Greece and Russia met to determine the second-placed team. Depending on the outcome of the match between Puerto Rico and Côte d'Ivoire, any of the three bottom teams (including China) could advance. Puerto Rico would advance with a win, and if Puerto Rico lost and China upset Turkey, then China would advance. If both Puerto Rico and China lost, all three teams would be tied at 1–4 overall and 1–1 against each other, meaning the team with the best goal average would advance to the quarterfinals.

In the first game, FIBA 40th-ranked Côte d'Ivoire stunned 10th-ranked Puerto Rico. Puerto Rico fell behind by as many as 13 in the second quarter but came back to lead briefly in the fourth, before finally losing to Côte d'Ivoire 88–79. With Côte d'Ivoire leading, both teams traded baskets in a back-and-forth final minute in a frantic attempt to win the goal average tiebreaker. Côte d'Ivoire had opened a 12-point lead, which was one point shy of seeing them through to the knockout round, before David Huertas hit a three in the closing seconds to make the final margin nine and send both teams home. With the outcome, China was assured of a berth in the quarterfinals by virtue of having the best goal average of the three teams. Brigham Young's Charles Abouo scored 19 points and Mouloukou Diabate added eight assists in the victory. Although falling short in qualifying for the knockout phase, Côte d'Ivoire took some consolation in its first ever victory in fifteen games spread over three FIBA World Championship appearances; Puerto Rico, meanwhile, was left to wonder what could have been after losing four single-digit games by a combined 23 points.

In the battle for second place, Russia used a 27–6 run late in the third quarter to turn a one-point deficit into a twenty-point lead en route to a 73–69 victory over Greece. A late run came up short for the Greeks, which finished the group 3–2 and advanced to play defending champions and group D runner-up Spain. Timofey Mozgov scored 18 points, as Russia claimed second place and a far more favorable matchup against the third place team in group D, New Zealand.

In the final game, Turkey jumped out to a 12–2 lead and never looked back in an 87–40 blowout over China to remain undefeated in the group. Oğuz Savaş scored 20 points for the Turks while Ömer Aşık (17 points, 13 rebounds) and Ersan İlyasova each had double-doubles. With China's fourth-place position secure, Chinese stars Yi Jianlian, Liu Wei, and Wang Zhizhi all rested; without their stars, China shot a measly 27 percent (17 of 63) from the field. The hosts advanced to play France, which finished fourth in group D. Despite its 1–4 record, China advanced to play Lithuania, who won group D with a 5-0 record.

=== Puerto Rico vs. Côte d'Ivoire ===
September 2
16:00

Report

Puerto Rico	79–88	Ivory Coast
Scoring by quarter: 14–19, 19–20, 26–25, 20–24
Pts: Barea 19; Rebs: Balkman 10; Asts: Barea 7		Pts: Abouo 19; Rebs: Kone 10; Asts: Diabate 8

Ankara Arena, Ankara
Attendance: 1,200
Referees: Ilija Belosevic (SRB), Hector Sanchez (VEN), Vitalis Odhiambo Gode (KEN)

=== Greece vs. Russia ===
September 2
18:30

Report

Greece	69–73	Russia
Scoring by quarter: 10–20, 20–10, 13–29, 26–14
Pts: Schortsanitis 16; Rebs: Schortsanitis 9 Asts: 4 tied with 2		Pts: Mozgov 18; Rebs: Voronov 6 Asts: Ponkrashov 6

Ankara Arena, Ankara
Attendance: 3,500
Referees: Sasa Pukl (SLO), Cristiano Jesus Maranho (BRA), Fernando Rocha (POR)

=== Turkey vs. China ===
September 2
21:00

Report

Turkey	87–40	China
Scoring by quarter: 15–6, 24-7, 27–12, 21–15
Pts: Savaş 20; Rebs: Aşık 13; Asts: Güler 7		Pts: Sun Y. 15; Rebs: Su W. 9 Asts: Ding J.H., Sun Y., Yu S.L. 2

Ankara Arena, Ankara
Attendance: 10,500
Referees: Carl Jungebrand (FIN), Pablo Alberto Estevez (ARG), Marwan Egho (LIB)
