= 2010 FIBA World Championship Group A =

Group A of the 2010 FIBA World Championship took place between August 28 September 2, 2010. The group played all of their games at Kadir Has Arena in Kayseri, Turkey.

The group was composed of Angola, Argentina, Australia, Germany, Jordan and Serbia. Jordan was playing in its first ever FIBA World Championship after finishing third at the FIBA Asia Championship 2009. Before the tournament, their average FIBA World Ranking was 12.2; excluding Jordan, the lowest in the rankings at 38th, it was 7.2. Based on the rankings, it was the most competitive group. Other than Jordan, all five teams were ranked in the top twelve in the FIBA World Ranking; it was the only group to have more than three such teams.

The four teams with the best records – Serbia, Argentina, Australia, and Angola – advanced to the knockout stage. Each of the four teams reached the knockout stage for the second consecutive World Championship. Germany was eliminated in 17th place with a 2–3 record while Jordan was sent home without a victory.

== Standings ==
Pos	Team	Pld	W	L	PF	PA	PD	Pts	Qualification
1	Serbia	5	4	1	465	356	+109	9 (Note: Head-to-head record: Serbia 1–0 Argentina)	Eighth–finals
2	Argentina	5	4	1	413	379	+34	9	Eighth–finals
3	Australia	5	3	2	381	341	+40	8	Eighth–finals
4	Angola	5	2	3	340	414	−74	7 (Note: Head-to-head record: Angola 1–0 Germany)	Eighth–finals
5	Germany	5	2	3	378	402	−24	7	
6	Jordan	5	0	5	361	446	−85	5	

Source: FIBA archive
Rules for classification: 1) points; 2) head-to-head points; 3) head-to-head goal average; 4) head-to-head number of points scored.
Notes:

All times local (UTC+3)

== August 28 ==
Day 1 of play in Group A saw all three favorites win in drastically different fashions. In the first game of the day, Australia surprisingly struggled and narrowly held on for a 76–75 victory over the 38th-ranked Jordan. Jordan – which was not able to play any warmup games as a result of a FIBA-imposed eight-month suspension – led by as many as 11 points and found themselves ahead 75–70 with 1:10 to go in the game. However, Australia closed the game on a 6–0 run and Jordan's Rasheim Wright missed a layup in the closing seconds to give the Aussies a one points victory.

In the second game of the day, Serbia entered short-handed following the suspension of Nenad Krstić (3 games) and Miloš Teodosić for their role in a brawl with Greece in an exhibition game. Despite the suspensions, Serbia never trailed in dominating African champions Angola, 94–44. All ten Serbian players that played in the game scored, while only one Angolan player, Olimpio Cipriano, reached double figures.

The final game of the day saw FIBA Number One ranked Argentina severely tested by Germany. The Germans tied the game in the final two minutes after trailing by as many as 13 points early in the fourth quarter. Down one in the final minute, Germany had a chance to take a lead, but Argentine veteran Hernán Jasen stole the ball from Germany's Demond Greene; Carlos Delfino then made three free throws in the last ten seconds as the Argentines held on for a 78–74 victory.

=== Australia vs. Jordan ===
August 28
16:30

Report

Australia	76–75	Jordan
Scoring by quarter: 12–18, 20–21, 24–16, 20–20
Pts: Marić 23; Rebs: Andersen, Marić 9 Asts: Andersen 4		Pts: Abbas 20; Rebs: Abbas 10; Asts: Daghlas 9

Kadir Has Arena, Kayseri
Referees: Jose Anibal Carrion (PUR), Murat Biricik (TUR), Samir Abaakil (MAR)

=== Angola vs. Serbia ===
August 28
19:00

Report

Angola	44–94	Serbia
Scoring by quarter: 9–25, 9–18, 14–34, 12–17
Pts: Cipriano 10; Rebs: Ambrosio 7 Asts: Cipriano, Gomes, Almeida, Lutonda, Mingas 1		Pts: Rašić 22; Rebs: Kešelj 8 Asts: Veličković 7

Kadir Has Arena, Kayseri
Referees: Juan Arteaga (ESP), Longsheng Qiao (CHN), Marcos Fornies Benito (BRA)

=== Germany vs. Argentina ===
August 28
21:30

Report

Germany	74–78	Argentina
Scoring by quarter: 18–23, 24–16, 12–26, 20–13
Pts: Greene 20; Rebs: Jagla 10; Asts: Hamann 5		Pts: Delfino 27; Rebs: Delfino 8 Asts: Prigioni 5

Kadir Has Arena, Kayseri
Referees: William Gene Kennedy (USA), Eddie Viator (FRA), Olegs Latisevs (LAT)

== August 29 ==
In the first game of Day 2, Angola rebounded from its opening day 50-point trouncing at the hands of Serbia to beat Jordan 79–65. Tournament debutants Jordan entered the fourth quarter with a lead for the second day in a row. The Angolans quickly erased the lead with a 10–0 run to start the fourth quarter and eventually outscored the Jordanians 33–18 in the quarter for the 14-point victory. Miguel Lutonda, the oldest player in the tournament at age 38, scored sixteen points for Angola in the victory.

In the second game of the day, Germany stunned Serbia in a thrilling double overtime victory. Neither team led by more than six points at any point during the see-saw battle. Serbia's Aleksandar Rašić hit a three-pointer with eleven seconds left to send the game into overtime tied at 69. After a rather uneventful first overtime, the Germans took a five-point lead with one minute left in the second overtime when Jan-Hendrik Jagla hit a three-pointer. Serbia pulled back within one, but Milenko Tepić missed a shot in the closing seconds and the young German team held on for the one-point victory.

Finally, game three saw another thriller as Argentina barely stayed undefeated with a 74–72 victory over Australia. Australia led by as many as seven points in the fourth quarter before the top-ranked Argentines fought back for a late lead. Down four in the closing seconds, Australia's Joe Ingles hit a long two-pointer and Hernán Jasen threw away the ensuing inbounds pass for the Argentines. Adam Gibson then had a wide-open three-pointer for the Aussies off the inbounds pass, but his shot rimmed out at the buzzer, giving the Argentines the two-point victory. Luis Scola scored a game-high 31 points for the Argentines.

=== Jordan vs. Angola ===
August 29
16:30

Report

Jordan	65–79	Angola
Scoring by quarter: 17–16, 18–13, 12–17, 18–33
Pts: Wright 18; Rebs: Abbas 11; Asts: Daghlas 5		Pts: Lutonda 16; Rebs: Almeida, Ambrosio, Gomes 6 Asts: Cipriano, Almeida, Ambrosio 3

Kadir Has Arena, Kayseri
Referees: William Gene Kennedy (USA), Eddie Viator (FRA), Olegs Latisevs (LAT)

=== Serbia vs. Germany ===
August 29
19:00

Report

Serbia	81–82 (2OT)	Germany
Scoring by quarter: 17–14, 18–23, 19–19, 15–13, Overtime: 4–4, 8–9
Pts: Perović 20; Rebs: Velicković 9 Asts: Marković 7		Pts: Jagla 22; Rebs: Jagla 9 Asts: Jagla 4

Kadir Has Arena, Kayseri
Referees: Jose Anibal Carrion (PUR), Marcos Fornies Benito (BRA), Samir Abaakil (MAR)

=== Argentina vs. Australia ===
August 29
21:30

Report

Argentina	74–72	Australia
Scoring by quarter: 20–25, 13–14, 19–17, 22–16
Pts: Scola 31; Rebs: Jasen 10; Asts: Prigioni 7		Pts: Ingles 22; Rebs: Nielsen 10; Asts: Mills 5

Kadir Has Arena, Kayseri
Referees: Juan Arteaga (ESP), Guerrino Cerebuch (ITA), Longsheng Qiao (CHN)

== August 30 ==
After three exciting games on Day 2, Day 3 was a relative letdown, as all three games were blowouts. In the day's first game, Serbia put a quick end to Jordan's hopes of a third consecutive tight game, jumping out to a 33–20 first quarter lead en route to a 43-point victory. For the second time in three games, every Serbian player who suited up for the game scored. Guard Miloš Teodosić returned from suspension to score seven points and dish out seven assists, while forwards Duško Savanović and Marko Kešelj each scored 21 points for the Serbians.

In Game 2, unlike Serbia, Germany came out flat the day after their double overtime upset victory in a 35-point defeat at the hands of the Aussies. Australia won in dominating fashion after their previous two games came down to the final buzzer. Patrick Mills took advantage of the tired Germans, scoring 16 points and dishing out seven assists in 24 minutes of action.

In the final game of the day, Argentina finally had a dominant performance, beating Angola 91–70 to stay undefeated. Trailing by 13 at the half, Angola used a third quarter push to pull back within five before Argentina outscored the Angolans 27–11 in the fourth quarter. Luis Scola scored a game-high 32 points and grabbed 8 rebounds in the victory.

=== Jordan vs. Serbia ===
August 30
16:30

Report

Jordan	69–112	Serbia
Scoring by quarter: 20–33, 17–24, 11–26, 21–29
Pts: Daghlas 19; Rebs: Adais 7 Asts: Daghlas 4		Pts: Savanović, Kešelj 21; Rebs: Savanović 7 Asts: Rašić 8

Kadir Has Arena, Kayseri
Referees: Guerrino Cerebuch (ITA), Eddie Viator (FRA), Longsheng Qiao (CHN)

=== Australia vs. Germany ===
August 30
19:00

Report

Australia	78–43	Germany
Scoring by quarter: 17–7, 19–13, 24–11, 16–12
Pts: Mills 16; Rebs: Andersen 8 Asts: Mills 7		Pts: Benzing 11; Rebs: Pleiß 7 Asts: Schaffartzik 3

Kadir Has Arena, Kayseri
Referees: William Gene Kennedy (USA), Juan Arteaga (ESP), Murat Biricik (TUR)

=== Angola vs. Argentina ===
August 30
21:30

Report

Angola	70–91	Argentina
Scoring by quarter: 20–23, 12–22, 27–19, 11–27
Pts: Gomes 16; Rebs: Gomes 7 Asts: Gomes 5		Pts: Scola 32; Rebs: Scola 8 Asts: Delfino, Jasen 4

Kadir Has Arena, Kayseri
Referees: Jose Anibal Carrion (PUR), Samir Abaakil (MAR), Marcos Fornies Benito (BRA)

== August 31 ==
Rest day.

== September 1 ==
After an off day, Group A returned to action on September 1. In the day's first game, Serbia beat Australia 94–79, finally playing at full-strength after center Nenad Krstić returned from suspension. After trailing for most of the game, Australia pulled within three with 2:07 left before Serbia closed the game on a 13–1 run. Krstić scored 14 points and had 10 rebounds in his return from suspension.

Australia's loss meant that Germany needed to beat Angola in the day's second game to have any chance of qualifying for the Round of 16 (Angola still would have had an outside chance with a loss). In a back-and-forth game, Angola took a 92-88 overtime victory to send them and Australia to the knockout stage and send Germany home early. After leading much of the game, Angola found themselves down by 10 with less than four minutes to play in the game. Olimpio Cipriano hit two free throws with 16 seconds left to cap off a 14–4 run to close regulation for the Angolans. Germany never led in overtime as Angola reached the knockout phase for the second consecutive tournament. Cipriano scored 30 points in the victory while Joaquim Gomes added 16 points and 14 rebounds. Jan-Hendrik Jagla scored 23 points in the losing effort for the Germans.

In game three, Luis Scola scored 30 points for Argentina – his third straight game with at least 30 points – in an 88–79 victory over Jordan. Argentina led by as many as twenty points before Jordan pulled back within five in the fourth quarter. Rasheim Wright scored 22 points to lead Jordan.

=== Serbia vs. Australia ===
September 1
16:30

Report

Serbia	94–79	Australia
Scoring by quarter: 16–12, 27–25, 26–24, 25–18
Pts: Teodosić 19; Rebs: Krstić 10; Asts: Teodosić 3		Pts: Newley 13; Rebs: Andersen 7 Asts: Mills 6

Kadir Has Arena, Kayseri
Referees: Jose Anibal Carrion (PUR), William Gene Kennedy (USA), Eddie Viator (FRA)

=== Germany vs. Angola ===
September 1
19:00

Report

Germany	88–92 (OT)	Angola
Scoring by quarter: 19–19, 16–21, 19–18, 24–20, Overtime: 10–14
Pts: Jagla 23; Rebs: Schaffartzik 7 Asts: Hamann 5		Pts: Cipriano 30; Rebs: Gomes 14; Asts: Almeida, Morais 3

Kadir Has Arena, Kayseri
Referees: Guerrino Cerebuch (ITA), Juan Arteaga (ESP), Samir Abaakil (MAR)

=== Argentina vs. Jordan ===
September 1
21:30

Report

Argentina	88–79	Jordan
Scoring by quarter: 35–19, 14–18, 12–18, 27–24
Pts: Scola 30; Rebs: Scola 13; Asts: Prigioni 9		Pts: Wright 22; Rebs: Abbas 10; Asts: Daghlas 4

Kadir Has Arena, Kayseri
Referees: Murat Biricik (TUR), Marcos Fornies Benito (BRA), Olegs Latisevs (LAT)

== September 2 ==
Angola's victory over Germany on Day 4 meant that the final day of group play was for positioning – Argentina and Serbia would play for first place, Australia and Angola for third place, and Germany and Jordan for fifth place.

Angola raced out to an early seven point first-quarter lead before Australia took over in a 21-point victory. With both teams already assured of a knockout round spot, both teams gave significant playing time to bench players; Patrick Mills was the only player in double figures, scoring 11 for the Aussies.

Serbia took first place in the group with a narrow 84–82 victory over previously unbeaten Argentina. Serbia's Duško Savanović hit a three-pointer with 18 seconds left to break a 77–77 tie and Aleksandar Rašić hit four free throws in the closing seconds to seal the victory. Luis Scola again led Argentina with 32 points, becoming Argentina's all-time leading scorer at the World Championships in the process.

Germany and Jordan met in the group's final game. Both teams had already been eliminated, and it showed as Jordan's coach Mário Palma commented that both teams played "without spirit." Germany prevailed in a 91–73 victory, sending the Jordanians home without a victory in their first appearance at the World Championships.

=== Angola vs. Australia ===
September 2
16:30

Report

Angola	55–76	Australia
Scoring by quarter: 18–15, 11–24, 9–21, 17–16
Pts: Lutonda 9 Rebs: Gomes 5 Asts: Morais 3		Pts: Mills 11; Rebs: Nielsen 7 Asts: Nielsen 6

Kadir Has Arena, Kayseri
Referees: Marcos Fornies Benito (BRA), Olegs Latisevs (LAT), Samir Abaakil (MAR)

=== Argentina vs. Serbia ===
September 2
19:00

Report

Argentina	82–84	Serbia
Scoring by quarter: 22–20, 17–20, 15–18, 28–26
Pts: Scola 32; Rebs: Delfino, Scola 7 Asts: Prigioni 9		Pts: Savanović 19; Rebs: Krstić 8 Asts: Teodosić 4

Kadir Has Arena, Kayseri
Referees: William Gene Kennedy (USA), Juan Arteaga (ESP), Murat Biricik (TUR)

=== Jordan vs. Germany ===
September 2
21:30

Report

Jordan	73–91	Germany
Scoring by quarter: 17–28, 16–12, 17–27, 23–24
Pts: Daghlas 22; Rebs: Al-Khas 9 Asts: Abbas, Daghlas 6		Pts: Pleiß 23; Rebs: Ohlbrecht 10; Asts: Hamann 4

Kadir Has Arena, Kayseri
Referees: Guerrino Cerebuch (ITA), Longsheng Qiao (CHN), Eddie Viator (FRA)
