= Monia =

Monia may refer to:

- Monia (album), the 2000 Monia Sjöström album
- Monia (bivalve), genus of bivalves
- Monia (given name), female given name
- Sergei Monia (born 1983), Russian former professional basketball player

== See also ==
- Mœnia
- Monja (disambiguation)
