= Assie =

Assie is a surname. Notable people with the surname include:

- Brice Assie (born 1983), an Ivorian and French basketball player
- Vivien Assie (born 1992), an Ivorian footballer
