= Monja =

Monja may refer to:

- Monjayaki, a type of dish cooked using an iron plate in Japanese cuisine
- Monja (given name)

== See also ==
- Monjas, a municipality in Jalapa Department, Guatemala
- Monia (disambiguation)
