= 2010 United States men's FIBA World Championship team =

Basketball team

The United States men's national basketball team won the gold medal at the 2010 FIBA World Championship. The team was an entirely rebuilt squad without a single member from its 2008 Olympic gold-medal team. The 2010 team relied heavily on a small lineup to win its first World Championship since 1994. They were led by 21-year-old Kevin Durant, who was the tournament's most valuable player. The U.S. automatically qualified for the 2012 Olympics in London, and overtook Argentina for the No. 1 world ranking.

== Roster ==
With none of the 2008 Olympians on the roster, the team was derisively called a "B-Team." The team featured six players 22 years old or younger and only one true center in Tyson Chandler. The team was projected to field a powerful inside-oriented team, but contractual issues with Amar'e Stoudemire and an injury to David Lee forced them to withdraw from the team on the opening day of training camp, and Brook Lopez was also unavailable due to injuries.

Head coach: (United States) Mike Krzyzewski

#	Pos	Name	Date of Birth	Height	Club
4	G	Chauncey Billups	September 25, 1976 (age 33)	6'3" (191)	(United States) Denver Nuggets
5	F	Kevin Durant	September 29, 1988 (age 21)	6'9" (206)	(United States) Oklahoma City Thunder
6	G	Derrick Rose	October 4, 1988 (age 21)	6'3" (191)	(United States) Chicago Bulls
7	G	Russell Westbrook	November 12, 1988 (age 21)	6'3" (191)	(United States) Oklahoma City Thunder
8	F	Rudy Gay	September 17, 1986 (age 23)	6'8" (203)	(United States) Memphis Grizzlies
9	G	Andre Iguodala	January 28, 1984 (age 26)	6'6" (198)	(United States) Philadelphia 76ers
10	F	Danny Granger	April 20, 1983 (age 27)	6'8" (203)	(United States) Indiana Pacers
11	G	Stephen Curry	March 14, 1988 (age 22)	6'3" (191)	(United States) Golden State Warriors
12	G	Eric Gordon	December 25, 1988 (age 21)	6'3" (191)	(United States) Los Angeles Clippers
13	C	Kevin Love	September 7, 1988 (age 21)	6'10" (208)	(United States) Minnesota Timberwolves
14	F	Lamar Odom	November 6, 1979 (age 30)	6'10" (208)	(United States) Los Angeles Lakers
15	C	Tyson Chandler	October 2, 1982 (age 27)	7'1" (216)	(United States) Dallas Mavericks

== Preliminary round ==
Pos	Team	Pld	W	L	PF	PA	PD	Pts	Qualification
1	United States	5	5	0	455	331	+124	10	Eighth–finals
2	Slovenia	5	4	1	393	376	+17	9	Eighth–finals
3	Brazil	5	3	2	398	354	+44	8	Eighth–finals
4	Croatia	5	2	3	395	407	−12	7	Eighth–finals
5	Iran	5	1	4	301	367	−66	6	
6	Tunisia	5	0	5	300	407	−107	5	

Source: FIBA archive
Rules for classification: 1) points; 2) head-to-head points; 3) head-to-head goal average; 4) head-to-head number of points scored.

=== Croatia ===
August 28
19:00

Report

United States	106–78	Croatia
Scoring by quarter: 22–20, 26–6, 30–22, 28–30
Pts: Gordon 16; Rebs: Love 10; Asts: Billups, Curry, Westbrook 4		Pts: Bogdanović 17; Rebs: Tomić 8 Asts: Ukić 4

Abdi İpekçi Arena, Istanbul
Attendance: 12,500
Referees: Reynaldo Antonio Mercedes Sanchez (DOM), Yuji Hirahara (JPN), Christos Christodoulou (GRE)

=== Slovenia ===
August 29
16:30

Report

Slovenia	77–99	United States
Scoring by quarter: 11–23, 17–19, 18–25, 31–32
Pts: Nachbar 13; Rebs: Nachbar 4 Asts: Dragić, Bečirović 4		Pts: Durant 22; Rebs: Love 11; Asts: Rose, Billups 5

Abdi İpekçi Arena, Istanbul
Attendance: 12,500
Referees: José Martín (ESP), Christos Christodoulou (GRE), Stephen Seibel (CAN)

=== Brazil ===
August 30
21:30

Report

United States	70–68	Brazil
Scoring by quarter: 22–28, 21–18, 18–13, 9–9
Pts: Durant 27; Rebs: Durant 10; Asts: Billups 3		Pts: Marquinhos 16; Rebs: Splitter 10; Asts: Huertas 5

Abdi İpekçi Arena, Istanbul
Attendance: 12,500
Referees: Romualdas Brazauskas (LTU), Christos Christodoulou (GRE), Stephen Seibel (CAN)

=== Iran ===
September 1
19:00

Report

Iran	51–88	United States
Scoring by quarter: 13–19, 15–23, 11–20, 12–26
Pts: Haddadi 19; Rebs: Kazemi, Haddadi 5 Asts: Davoudi 2		Pts: Love 13; Rebs: Love, Chandler 6 Asts: Curry 5

Abdi İpekçi Arena, Istanbul
Attendance: 12,500
Referees: David Chambon (FRA), Yuji Hirahara (JPN), Jose Hernan Melgarejo Pinto (COL)

=== Tunisia ===
September 2
16:30

Report

United States	92–57	Tunisia
Scoring by quarter: 19–13, 20–20, 24–13, 29–13
Pts: Gordon 21; Rebs: Iguodala 6 Asts: 6 tied with 2		Pts: Kechrid 15; Rebs: Mejri 8 Asts: Dhifallah 2

Abdi İpekçi Arena, Istanbul
Attendance: 12,500
Referees: Recep Ankarali (TUR), Carlos José Julio (ANG), Jose Hernan Melgarejo Pinto (COL)

== Final round ==
=== Round of 16 – Angola ===
September 6
18:00

Report

United States	121–66	Angola
Scoring by quarter: 33–13, 32–25, 26–18, 30–10
Pts: Billups 19; Rebs: Odom 8 Asts: Rose, Westbrook 6		Pts: Gomes 21; Rebs: Ambrosio 7 Asts: Morais 4

Sinan Erdem Dome, Istanbul
Attendance: 15,000
Referees: Milivoje Jovcic (SRB), Borys Ryzhyk (UKR), Samir Abaakil (MAR)

=== Quarterfinals – Russia ===
9 September
18:00

Report

United States	89–79	Russia
Scoring by quarter: 25–25, 19–14, 26–17, 19–23
Pts: Durant 33; Rebs: Odom 12; Asts: Billups 5		Pts: Bykov 17; Rebs: Vorontsevich 12; Asts: Khvostov 5

Sinan Erdem Dome, Istanbul
Attendance: 15,000
Referees: Reynaldo Antonio Mercedes Sanchez (DOM), José Martín (ESP), Jakob Zamojski (POL)

=== Semifinals – Lithuania ===
11 September
19:00

Report

United States	89–74	Lithuania
Scoring by quarter: 23–12, 19–15, 23–26, 24–21
Pts: Durant 38; Rebs: Odom 10; Asts: Billups, Rose, Westbrook 3		Pts: Javtokas 15; Rebs: Javtokas 9 Asts: Kalnietis, Mačiulis, Pocius, Delininkaitis 2

Sinan Erdem Dome, Istanbul
Attendance: 15,000
Referees: Carl Jungebrand (FIN), Sasa Pukl (SLO), Marcos Fornies Benito (BRA)

=== Final – Turkey ===
12 September
21:30

Report

Turkey	64–81	United States
Scoring by quarter: 17–22, 15–20, 16–19, 16–20
Pts: Türkoğlu 16; Rebs: İlyasova 11; Asts: Tunçeri 5		Pts: Durant 28; Rebs: Odom 11; Asts: Rose 6

Sinan Erdem Dome, Istanbul
Attendance: 15,000
Referees: Cristiano Jesus Maranho (BRA), Luigi Lamonica (ITA), Juan Arteaga (ESP)

== Statistics ==
Legend
GP	Games played	GS	Games started	MPG	Minutes per game
FGM	Field goals made	FGA	Field goals attempted	FG%	Field goal percentage
3PM	3-point field goals made	3PA	3-point field goals attempted	3P%	3-point field goal percentage
FTM	Free throws made	FTA	Free throws attempted	FT%	Free throw percentage
RPG	Rebounds per game	APG	Assists per game	PPG	Points per game

Player	GP	GS	MPG	FGM	FGA	FG%	3PM	3PA	3P%	FTM	FTA	FT%	RPG	APG	PPG
Kevin Durant	9	9	28.2	74	133	.556	26	57	.456	31	34	.912	6.1	1.8	22.8
Chauncey Billups	9	9	23.1	25	64	.391	14	44	.318	24	28	.857	1.9	3.1	9.8
Russell Westbrook	9	0	19.4	29	62	.468	3	7	.429	21	25	.840	2.8	2.6	9.1
Eric Gordon	9	0	17.6	27	59	.458	19	42	.452	4	5	.800	1.6	0.6	8.6
Derrick Rose	9	9	23.0	27	59	.458	5	18	.278	6	12	.500	2.1	3.2	7.2
Lamar Odom	9	9	22.0	28	52	.538	3	4	.750	5	10	.500	7.7	0.4	7.1
Rudy Gay	9	0	13.4	22	45	.489	6	19	.316	13	18	.722	2.9	0.8	7.0
Kevin Love	9	0	8.9	20	35	.571	4	9	.444	7	9	.778	4.9	0.8	5.7
Andre Iguodala	9	9	18.9	20	34	.588	2	7	.286	9	19	.474	4.6	1.9	5.7
Stephen Curry	8	0	10.6	14	31	.452	7	19	.368	2	2	1.000	1.4	2.1	4.6
Danny Granger	7	0	9.7	12	30	.400	3	13	.231	2	5	.500	0.9	1.0	4.1
Tyson Chandler	9	0	8.4	9	14	.643	0	0	.000	5	10	.500	2.7	0.4	2.6
Total	9	9	200.0	307	618	.497	92	239	.385	129	176	.733	41.7	18.2	92.8
Opponents	9	9	200.0	217	569	.381	66	219	.301	114	173	.659	36.0	11.2	68.2
