= 2010 FIBA World Championship Group D =

Group D of the 2010 FIBA World Championship commenced play on August 28 and ended on September 2, 2010. The group played all of their games at Halkapınar Sport Hall, İzmir, Turkey.

The group was composed of Canada, France, wild cards Lebanon and Lithuania, New Zealand and defending champions Spain. Their average FIBA World Ranking at the start of the tournament was 13.3; excluding Lebanon, the lowest in the rankings, it was 11.2.

The four teams with the best records – Lithuania, Spain, New Zealand, and France – advanced to the knockout stage. All four teams advanced to the knockout stage for the second consecutive tournament.

== Standings ==
Pos	Team	Pld	W	L	PF	PA	PD	Pts	Qualification
1	Lithuania	5	5	0	391	341	+50	10	Eighth–finals
2	Spain	5	3	2	420	356	+64	8 (Note: Head-to-head record: Spain 1–1 (1.07 GAvg), New Zealand 1–1 (0.97 GAvg), France 1–1 (0.96 GAvg))	Eighth–finals
3	New Zealand	5	3	2	424	400	+24	8	Eighth–finals
4	France	5	3	2	351	339	+12	8	Eighth–finals
5	Lebanon	5	1	4	339	440	−101	6	
6	Canada	5	0	5	330	379	−49	5	

Source: FIBA archive
Rules for classification: 1) points; 2) head-to-head points; 3) head-to-head goal average; 4) head-to-head number of points scored.
Notes:

All times local (UTC+3)

== August 28 ==
Day 1 of Group D play kicked off on August 28. Lithuania topped New Zealand 92–79 despite a tournament high 37 points from New Zealand's Kirk Penney. Lithuania's big men proved too much for New Zealand in the second quarter, outscoring the Kiwis 25–10. Linas Kleiza scored 27 points, including 11 in the decisive fourth quarter, to lead the Lithuanians.

In the day's second game, Lebanon, the lowest ranked team in the group, turned a nine-point third quarter deficit into a ten-point minor upset victory over Canada. Canada proved unable to stop Lebanon's Fadi El Khatib, who scored 31 points and grabbed eight rebounds. The Miami Heat's Joel Anthony scored 17 points in the loss for the Canadians.

In the nightcap, France pulled off the biggest upset of the tournament's first day in beating defending champions Spain 72–66. The French team, lightly regarded coming into the tournament because five of their top players elected not to play, started off slow, missing four shots and turning the ball over three times before scoring their first basket, before outscoring Spain 29–22 in the final quarter for the victory. Twenty-year-old Andrew Albicy, France's youngest player, scored 13 points and made five of six free throws in the last minute to preserve the victory. Juan Carlos Navarro scored a game-high 17 points for Spain, which lost in the first group stage for the first time since 1994.

=== New Zealand vs. Lithuania ===
August 28
16:00

Report

New Zealand	79–92	Lithuania
Scoring by quarter: 24–25, 10–25, 27–24, 18–18
Pts: Penney 37; Rebs: Abercrombie 11; Asts: Cameron, Tait 3		Pts: Kleiza 27; Rebs: Kleiza 8 Asts: Kalnietis, Mačiulis 4

Halkapınar Sport Hall, İzmir
Attendance: 3,500
Referees: Anthony Dewayne Jordan (USA), Srdan Dozai (CRO), Milivoje Jovcic (SRB)

=== Canada vs. Lebanon ===
August 28
18:30

Report

Canada	71–81	Lebanon
Scoring by quarter: 20–20, 17–14, 21–23, 13–24
Pts: Anthony 17; Rebs: Kendall 11; Asts: Brown 6		Pts: El Khatib 31; Rebs: Vroman, El Khatib 8 Asts: Vroman, Rustom 3

Halkapınar Sport Hall, İzmir
Attendance: 5,500
Referees: Luigi Lamonica (ITA), Borys Ryzhyk (UKR), Heros Avanesian (IRI)

=== France vs. Spain ===
August 28
21:00

Report

France	72–66	Spain
Scoring by quarter: 9–18, 18–10, 16–16, 29–22
Pts: Gelabale 16; Rebs: Diaw, Gelabale 6 Asts: Bokolo, Diaw 5		Pts: Navarro 17; Rebs: Gasol 7 Asts: Rubio 3

Halkapınar Sport Hall, İzmir
Attendance: 7,200
Referees: Jorge Vasquez (PUR), Michael Aylen (AUS), Juan Jose Fernandez (ARG)

== August 29 ==
Canada nearly pulled off Group D's second major upset before falling to Lithuania 70–68. The young Canadians were seemingly cruising to victory, opening up a 17-point third quarter lead before Lithuania ended the quarter on an 11–0 run against Canada's backups to erase most of the deficit. Jermaine Anderson still had a chance to send the game into overtime, but missed a pull-up jumper at the buzzer after receiving Levon Kendall's outlet pass. Linas Kleiza again led unbeaten Lithuania, scoring a game-high 18 points and grabbing a team-high 10 rebounds.

In game two, France easily defeated Lebanon 86–59 in a battle of Day 1 winners. France used a 10–0 second quarter run to break open a tie game; from there, France dominated the game, slowed down only when Nicolas Batum's second quarter dunk twisted the rim and delayed the game for 15 minutes. Four French players scored in double digits, led by Mickaël Gelabale's 18 and Alain Koffi's 17.

Spain took out its day one frustration on winless New Zealand, never trailing en route to a 101–84 victory. Five Spanish players reached double figures, led by Marc Gasol's 22 points, and Ricky Rubio dished out a group-stage high 11 assists. New Zealand started out 0–2 for the second consecutive tournament.

=== Lithuania vs. Canada ===
August 29
16:00

Report

Lithuania	70–68	Canada
Scoring by quarter: 12–20, 21–23, 22–14, 15–11
Pts: Kleiza 18; Rebs: Kleiza 10; Asts: Pocius 4		Pts: Anderson 15; Rebs: Kendall 11; Asts: Anderson 5

Halkapınar Sport Hall, İzmir
Attendance: 3,000
Referees: Luigi Lamonica (ITA), Jakub Zamojski (POL), Juan Jose Fernandez (ARG)

=== Lebanon vs. France ===
August 29
18:30

Report

Lebanon	59–86	France
Scoring by quarter: 20–22, 8–20, 19–21, 12–23
Pts: Vroman 19; Rebs: Freije 8 Asts: Rustom 4		Pts: Gelabale 18; Rebs: Mahinmi 9 Asts: Diaw 8

Halkapınar Sport Hall, İzmir
Attendance: 3,750
Referees: Anthony Dewayne Jordan (USA), Milivoje Jovcic (SRB), Michael Aylen (AUS)

=== Spain vs. New Zealand ===
August 29
21:00

Report

Spain	101–84	New Zealand
Scoring by quarter: 28–19, 20–25, 29–19, 24–21
Pts: Gasol 22; Rebs: Fernández 12; Asts: Rubio 11		Pts: Penney 21; Rebs: Vukona, Abercrombie 6 Asts: Cameron 4

Halkapınar Sport Hall, İzmir
Attendance: 2,700
Referees: Jorge Vazquez (PUR), Borys Ryzhyk (UKR), Heros Avanesian (IRI)

== August 30 ==
Rest day.

== August 31 ==
Group D returned to action on August 31 following the rest day. New Zealand earned its first victory of the tournament with a convincing 108–76 win over Lebanon. The Kiwis set the tone from the first quarter, scoring five lay-ups in the final minutes of the first quarter to take a 32–16 lead at the quarter break. From there, New Zealand continued to score, shooting 57% from the field, including 11 of 24 (45.8%) from three-point range. Six Kiwis reached double figures in scoring.

For the third consecutive game, Canada took a lead into the fourth quarter only to come up short once again in a 68–63 loss to undefeated France. Canada missed all six of their shots from the field in the final 90 seconds, and Mickaël Gelabale and Nicolas Batum each hit a pair of free throws in the closing seconds to seal the victory. Batum was France's sole offensive standout, scoring 24 points, as no other French player had more than eight points.

In the nightcap, Spain was upset for the second time in three games, falling to undefeated Lithuania 76–73. Spain jumped out to an 18-point third quarter lead, only to see Lithuania use a 23–5 run to tie the game up with 5:25 left. Linas Kleiza, who again led Lithuania with 17 points, scored four points in the closing seconds to clinch the victory. Down three with six seconds left, Spain had one last chance to send the game into overtime, but Martynas Pocius deflected Raúl López's last second pass and Spain failed to get a shot off. With Spain's loss, both Lithuania and France clinched a spot in the knockout round.

=== New Zealand vs. Lebanon ===
August 31
16:00

Report

New Zealand	108–76	Lebanon
Scoring by quarter: 32–16, 19–16, 30–24, 27–20
Pts: Penney 26; Rebs: Vukona, Abercrombie 7 Asts: Vukona, Jones, Cameron 4		Pts: El Khatib 18; Rebs: El Khatib 7 Asts: Mahmoud 4

Halkapınar Sport Hall, İzmir
Attendance: 2,000
Referees: Borys Ryzhyk (UKR), Jakub Zamojski (POL), Juan Jose Fernandez (ARG)

=== France vs. Canada ===
August 31
18:30

Report

France	68–63	Canada
Scoring by quarter: 15–15, 13–13, 18–20, 22–15
Pts: Batum 24; Rebs: Batum, Koffi 7 Asts: Diaw 5		Pts: Kendall 15; Rebs: Anthony 5 Asts: Kendall 3

Halkapınar Sport Hall, İzmir
Attendance: 3,850
Referees: Srdan Dozai (CRO), Jorge Vasquez (PUR), Michael Aylen (AUS)

=== Spain vs. Lithuania ===
August 31
21:00

Report

Spain	73–76	Lithuania
Scoring by quarter: 22–11, 21–24, 21–18, 9–23
Pts: Navarro, Gasol 18; Rebs: Fernández 9 Asts: Garbajosa, López 3		Pts: Kleiza 17; Rebs: Kleiza, Javtokas 8 Asts: Kalnietis 5

Halkapınar Sport Hall, İzmir
Attendance: 7,000
Referees: Luigi Lamonica (ITA), Anthony Dewayne Jordan (USA), Milivoje Jovcic (SRB)

== September 1 ==
Day 4 effectively became knockout day for Group D. New Zealand and Spain were in mutually beneficial positions, as both teams would advance if both won. Canada and Lebanon, meanwhile, needed victories to stay alive in the tournament. In the final game of the day, unbeaten France and Lithuania met to determine the group winner.

In the first game, New Zealand eliminated Canada with a 71–61 victory. Canada dropped to 0–4 for the tournament, with all four losses coming by ten points or less. Poor free throw shooting proved to be Canada's undoing, as they finished 15-for-25 from the charity stripe, including 7-of-13 in the third quarter. Kirk Penney, the Kiwis' leading scorer, again led all scorers, this time with 18 points.

In the second game, Spain fell behind early to Lebanon, trailing 22–21 at the quarter break, on the strength of Jackson Vroman's 12 first quarter points. Spain's big men took over from there, however, outscoring Lebanon in the paint 42–10 after the first quarter. Marc Gasol scored 25 points, including 22 in the second and third quarters to pace Spain. Vroman finished with 22 for Lebanon. The victory sent Spain and New Zealand into the knockout stage and eliminated Lebanon from contention.

In the final game of the day, Lithuania used a 28–11 third quarter to top France 69–55 and finish in first place in the group. France's Nicolas Batum scored nine first quarter points as the French jumped out to a 24–11 lead. France's shooting went cold from there, as Lithuania outscored them 47–17 between the start of the second quarter and 7:30 left in the fourth quarter. Jonas Mačiulis scored 19 points to lead Lithuania, while Batum finished with 13 for France. Lithuania clinched a quarterfinal game against the fourth-place finisher from Group C with the win.

=== Canada vs. New Zealand ===
September 1
16:00

Report

Canada	61–71	New Zealand
Scoring by quarter: 8–11, 20–24, 13–12, 20–24
Pts: Shepherd 15; Rebs: Kendall 7 Asts: Kendall 4		Pts: Penney 18; Rebs: Abercrombie 10; Asts: Tait 3

Halkapınar Sport Hall, İzmir
Attendance: 1,000
Referees: Borys Ryzhyk (UKR), Milivoje Jovcic (SRB), Jakub Zamojski (POL)

=== Lebanon vs. Spain ===
September 1
18:30

Report

Lebanon	57–91	Spain
Scoring by quarter: 22–21, 10–22, 15–29, 10–19
Pts: Vroman 22; Rebs: Vroman 9 Asts: Abdelnour, Vroman 2		Pts: Gasol 25; Rebs: Reyes 9 Asts: Rubio 7

Halkapınar Sport Hall, İzmir
Attendance: 3,200
Referees: Srdan Dozai (CRO), Luigi Lamonica (ITA), Heros Avanesian (IRI)

=== Lithuania vs. France ===
September 1
21:00

Report

Lithuania	69–55	France
Scoring by quarter: 11–24, 13–6, 28–11, 17–14
Pts: Mačiulis 19; Rebs: Javtokas 5 Asts: Kleiza 3		Pts: Batum 13; Rebs: Diaw 6 Asts: Batum 3

Halkapınar Sport Hall, İzmir
Attendance: 7,100
Referees: Jorge Vasquez (PUR), Anthony Dewayne Jordan (USA), Juan Jose Fernandez (ARG)

== September 2 ==
With Lithuania, France, Spain, and New Zealand already qualified for the knockout phase, the final day of group play was a battle for second place. With a win, France could lock up second place. Spain and New Zealand could each finish second with a win and help. Seeding was particularly important going into the group's final day of play, as the fourth-place finisher would earn an undesirable matchup with host Turkey, the undefeated Group C winner.

In the first game, Spain beat Canada with ease, sending the Canadians home without a win. Canada trailed by only five at halftime before shooting 3-for-17 in the third quarter to fall behind 63–48. Rudy Fernández and Fran Vázquez each scored 19 for Spain in the victory. With the loss, Canada's losing streak in World Championship group play stretched to nine, with their last win coming against Senegal in 1998. Spain finished group play 3–2; their 1.0705 goal average against New Zealand and France meant that they could finish no worse than third in the group, pending results of the final game.

Lithuania cruised to a victory over Lebanon in a game that would have no impact on either team, regardless of the result. Lebanon's starters were no match for Lithuania's backups, which played the majority of the game with first place already locked up. Lithuania finished the group with a perfect 5–0 record, while Lebanon failed to qualify for the knockout stage for the third consecutive year.

New Zealand and France met in the day's final game with knockout stage positions on the line. Kirk Penney again led the way for the Kiwis, scoring 25 points. New Zealand used a late 10–0 second quarter run to open up a 14-point halftime lead en route to the victory. With New Zealand on their way to victory, the final seconds of the game turned into a shootout in an attempt to win the goal average tiebreaker. The Kiwis outscored France 10 to 4 in the final 45 seconds and Thomas Abercrombie's three-pointer with six seconds left clinched third place for New Zealand. France dropped their final two games to finish a disappointing fourth and earn a knockout round matchup with host Turkey. New Zealand's victory meant Spain rebounded from its 1–2 start to finish second in the group.

=== Spain vs. Canada ===
September 2
16:00

Report

Spain	89–67	Canada
Scoring by quarter: 28–17, 14–20, 21–11, 26–19
Pts: Vázquez, Fernández 19; Rebs: Reyes 9 Asts: Rubio 8		Pts: Olynyk 14; Rebs: Anthony 6 Asts: Doornekamp, Anderson 2

Halkapınar Sport Hall, İzmir
Attendance: 1,855
Referees: Michael Aylen (AUS), Borys Ryzhyk (UKR), Juan Jose Fernandez (ARG)

=== Lebanon vs. Lithuania ===
September 2
18:30

Report

Lebanon	66–84	Lithuania
Scoring by quarter: 16–16, 16–23, 19–25, 15–20
Pts: Fahed 19; Rebs: Rustom, Abdelnour 6 Asts: Rustom 5		Pts: Seibutis 17; Rebs: Andriuškevičius, Klimavičius 7 Asts: Delininkaitis 4

Halkapınar Sport Hall, İzmir
Attendance: 4,300
Referees: Jorge Vazquez (PUR), Milivoje Jovcic (SRB), Jakub Zamojski (POL)

=== New Zealand vs. France ===
September 2
21:00

Report

New Zealand	82–70	France
Scoring by quarter: 17–20, 22–5, 19–18, 24–27
Pts: Penney 25; Rebs: Vukona 6 Asts: Cameron 6		Pts: Bokolo 13; Rebs: Piétrus 8 Asts: De Colo 4

Halkapınar Sport Hall, İzmir
Attendance: 3,215
Referees: Luigi Lamonica (ITA), Srdan Dozai (CRO), Heros Avanesian (IRI)
