= Monia (given name) =

Monia is a given name. Notable people with the name include:

- Monia Ben Jemia (born 1958), Tunisian law professor, academic, feminist
- Monia Baccaille (born 1984), Italian professional cyclist
- Monia Capelli (born 1969), former Italian female long-distance runner
- Monia Chokri (born 1982) is a Canadian actress and filmmaker
- Monia Kari (born 1971), Tunisian discus thrower
- Monia Mazigh (born 1970), Canadian author and academic best known for her efforts to free her husband Maher Arar
- Monia Sjöström (born 1973), Swedish female dansband singer

== See also ==
- Monia (disambiguation)
- Monja (given name)
