= Monja (given name) =

Monja is a given name. Notable people with the name include:

- Monja Danischewsky (1911–1994), English film producer and screenwriter
- Monja Jaona (1910–1994), Malagasy politician
- Monja Liseki (born 1979), Tanzanian footballer
- Monja Roindefo (born 1965), Malagasy politician

== See also ==
- Monja (disambiguation)
- Monia (given name)
