= 2010 FIBA World Championship =

2010 edition of the FIBA World Championship

2010 FIBA Dünya Basketbol Şampiyonası

Tournament details
- Host country: Turkey
- Dates: 28 August – 12 September
- Officially opened by: Abdullah Gül
- Teams: 24 (from 5 confederations)
- Venue: 5 (in 4 host cities)

Final positions
- Champions: United States (4th title)
- Runners-up: Turkey
- Third place: Lithuania
- Fourth place: Serbia

Tournament statistics
- Games played: 80
- MVP: (United States) Kevin Durant
- Top scorer: (Argentina) Luis Scola (27.1 points per game)

The 2010 FIBA World Championship was the 16th FIBA World Championship, the international basketball world championship contested by the men's national teams. The tournament ran from 28 August to 12 September 2010. It was co-organised by the International Basketball Federation (FIBA), Turkish Basketball Federation and the 2010 Organising Committee. It was considered as prestigious a competition as the Olympic Basketball Tournament. The tournament was hosted by Turkey.

For the third time (after the 1986 and 2006 tournaments), the World Championship had 24 competing nations. As a result, the group stage games were played in four cities, and the knockout round was hosted by Istanbul.

The United States won the tournament for their fourth time after going undefeated in the Opening Round and beating host Turkey in the final.

The draw for the Championship took place on 15 December 2009 in Istanbul. Teams were drawn into four preliminary round groups of six teams each. Teams first played a round-robin schedule, with the top sixteen teams advancing to the knockout stage.

== Bid ==
2010 FIBA World Championship bidding results
Nations	Round 1	Round 2
Turkey	7	10
France	8	9
Bosnia, Croatia, Serbia and Montenegro and Slovenia	4	—

Three bids from six countries – France, Turkey, and a joint bid from former Yugoslav republics Bosnia and Herzegovina, Croatia, Serbia and Montenegro, and Slovenia – made their final presentation during the FIBA's 20-member Central Board in Kuala Lumpur, Malaysia, on 5 December 2004. Previously, Australia and New Zealand, Italy, Russia and Puerto Rico announced their intention to bid from the tournament, but withdrew their bids prior to the votes. France won the first round of voting, but Turkey eventually won the right to host after the joint bidders were knocked out in the first round.

The tournament was the first time that Turkey has hosted the event and marked the first World Championship held in Europe since the 1998 FIBA World Championship was held in Greece.

== Venues ==
Below is a list of the venues which hosted games during the 2010 FIBA World Championship. Each preliminary round group was hosted in a single arena in Kayseri (Group A), Istanbul (Group B), Ankara (Group C), and İzmir (Group D). The knockout phase then moved to Istanbul's Sinan Erdem Dome. Ankara Arena, completed in 2010, and Kadir Has Arena, completed in 2008, were built for the championships, while the other three arenas underwent renovations for the event.

Turkey			Istanbul	
2010 FIBA World Championship is located in Turkey			2010 FIBA World Championship is located in Istanbul	
Preliminary round				Knockout stage
Ankara	İzmir	Kayseri	Istanbul	
Ankara Arena; Capacity: 11,000	Halkapınar Sport Hall; Capacity: 10,000	Kadir Has Arena; Capacity: 7,500	Abdi İpekçi Arena; Capacity: 12,500	Sinan Erdem Dome; Capacity: 16,500 (22,500)

== Qualifying ==
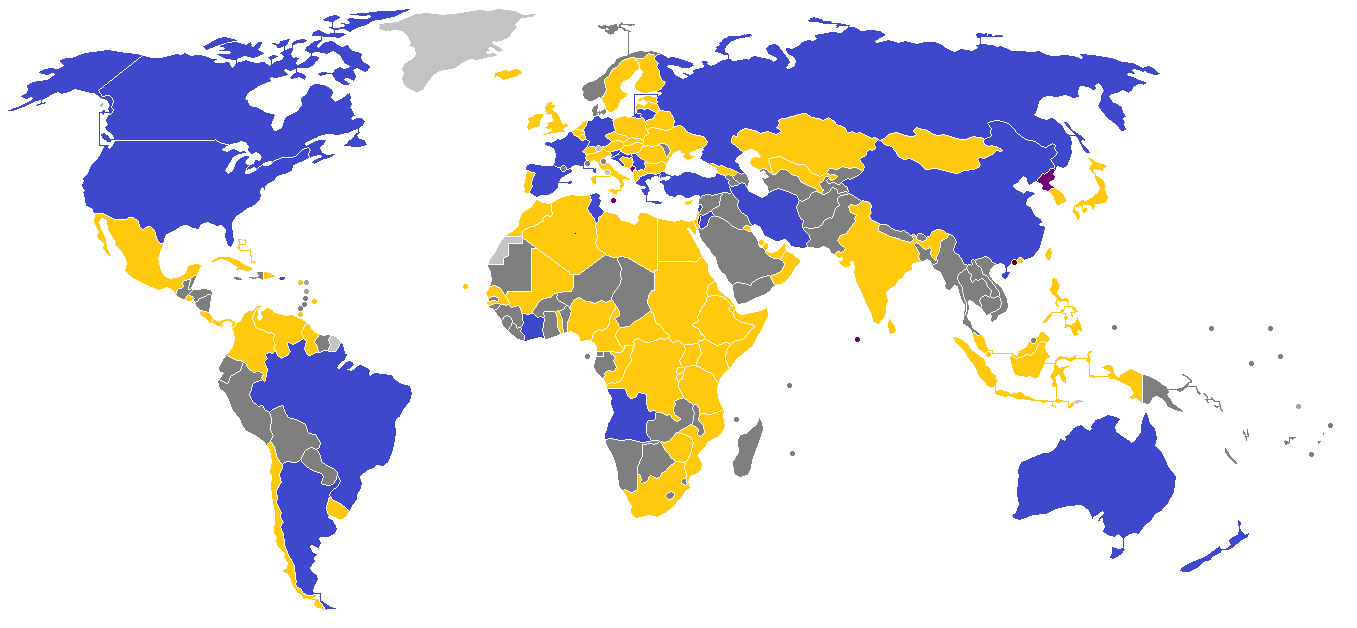
Qualified countries are in blue; those in yellow failed to qualify, and those in dark gray did not enter qualifying.

Turkey automatically qualified as the host country, and the United States also received an automatic berth for winning the 2008 Olympic men's basketball tournament.

Most other teams secured their places in continental qualifying tournaments (three from Africa, three from Asia, two from Oceania, four from the Americas, and six from Europe). FIBA invited four "wild card" teams to fill out the twenty-four team field.

=== Wild cards ===
The four wild cards were determined by FIBA through criteria. For example, a team must have played in the Zone's qualification tournament to receive recommendation. Also, in order for every team to have an opportunity for a wild card, a maximum of three teams from any Zone can be allotted a wild card entry. Once these requirements are satisfied, FIBA then looks at other important factors. Those include popularity of basketball within the country, success of the team, and government support for the team's National Federation. As of 2009, FIBA now requires that wild card candidates pay a late registration fee to be considered.

Fourteen teams paid the 500,000 € fee to apply for one of the four wild card spots. FIBA then whittled down the teams to eight semifinalists – Cameroon, Germany, Great Britain, Korea, Lebanon, Lithuania, Nigeria, and Russia. On Saturday 12 December 2009, FIBA awarded Germany, Lebanon, Lithuania and Russia the four wild cards.

=== List of qualified teams ===
The following 24 teams qualified for the final tournament (FIBA World Ranking at start of tournament in parentheses):

Event	Date	Location	Berths	Qualified
Host nation	5 December 2004	(Malaysia) Kuala Lumpur	1	Turkey
2008 Olympics	10–24 August 2008	(China) Beijing	1	United States
AfroBasket 2009	4–14 August 2009	(Libya) Tripoli and Benghazi	3	Angola; Ivory Coast; Tunisia
2009 FIBA Asia Championship	6–16 August 2009	(China) Tianjin	3	Iran; China; Jordan
FIBA Oceania Championship 2009	23–25 August 2009	(Australia) Sydney (New Zealand) Wellington	2	New Zealand; Australia
2009 FIBA Americas Championship	26 August–6 September 2009	(Puerto Rico) San Juan	4	Brazil; Puerto Rico; Argentina; Canada
EuroBasket 2009	7–20 September 2009	Poland	6	Spain; Serbia; Greece; Slovenia; France; Croatia
Wild cards	12 December 2009	(Turkey) Istanbul	4	Russia; Lebanon; Lithuania; Germany
TOTAL			24	

The draw for the championship took place in Istanbul on 15 December 2009.

== Group draw ==
The draw was held on 15 December 2009 at the Ciragan Palace Kempinski Hotel in Istanbul, which divided the qualified teams into four groups of six, groups A, B, C, and D, as listed for the preliminary round. Aside from the fact that those teams in the same line would not be in the same preliminary round groups, there were no other restrictions on how teams may be drawn.

Line 1	Line 2	Line 3	Line 4	Line 5	Line 6
United States; Argentina; Spain; Greece	Serbia; Slovenia; France; Turkey	Brazil; Puerto Rico; Canada; Australia	Croatia; Russia; Lithuania; Germany	China; Iran; Lebanon; Angola	Jordan; Tunisia; New Zealand; Ivory Coast

== Squads ==
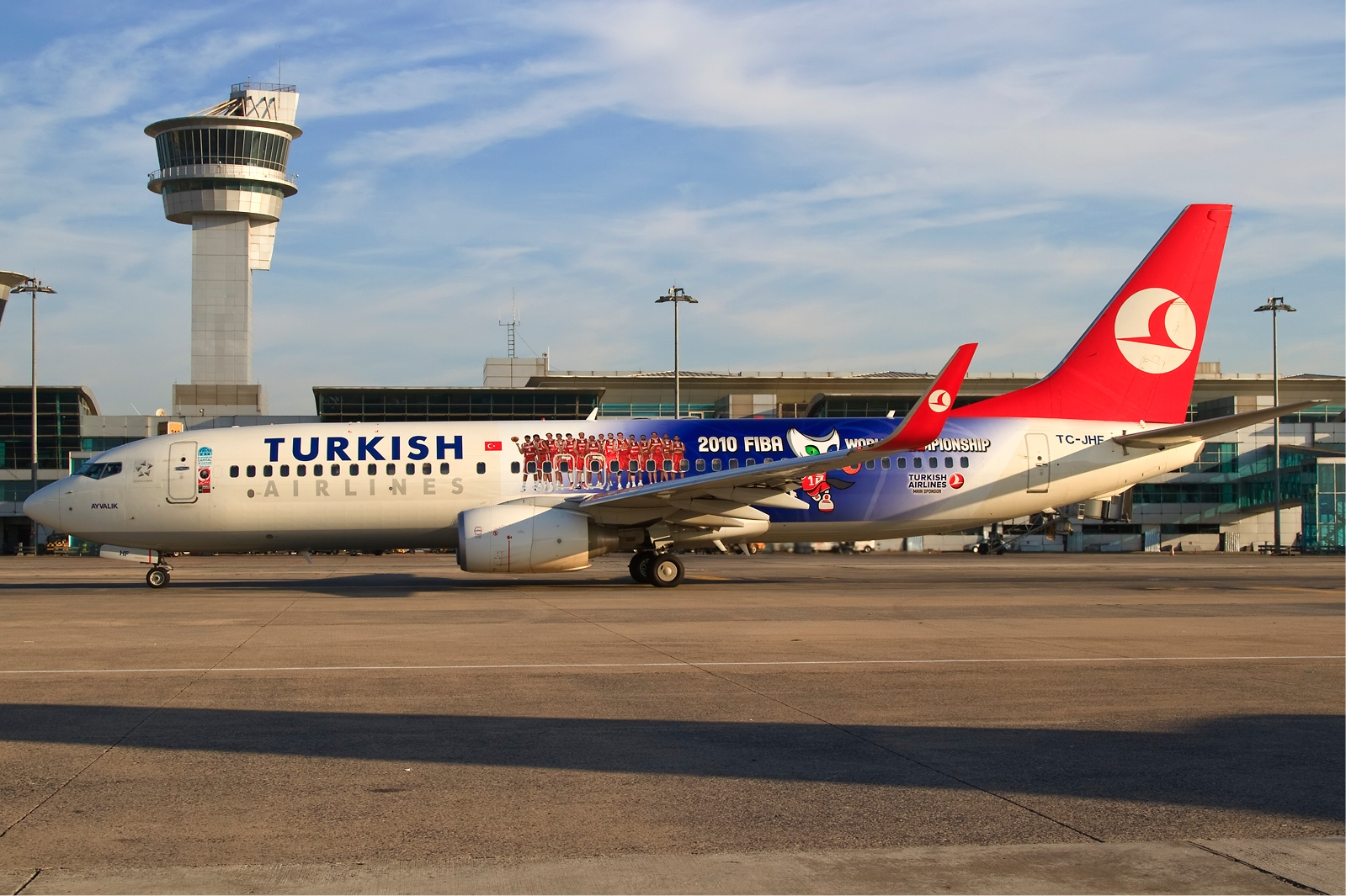
A Turkish Airlines Boeing 737-800 with the livery of the 2010 FIBA World Championship at the Atatürk International Airport in Istanbul. The company was among the official sponsors of the tournament.

At the start of tournament, all 24 participating countries had 12 players on their rosters. Final squads for the tournament were due on 26 August, two days before the start of competition.

Angola and the United States were the only teams made up of entirely domestic players (Jordan and Russia each had 11 domestic players). Slovenia was the only team composed entirely of individuals playing outside the domestic league. The Canada squad also consisted entirely of individuals playing outside the country, but at that time Canada had no professional league operating exclusively in the country (a minor professional league was scheduled to begin play in 2011). The National Basketball Association, based in the U.S., has a Canadian team, and several minor leagues operate on both sides of the U.S.—Canada border. Four Canadian squad members played in U.S.-based competitions—two with U.S.-based NBA teams, and two for Gonzaga University's team. Forty-one NBA players were selected to compete in the tournament, the most of any league.

== Preparation matches ==
=== Acropolis tournament ===
Greece and Serbia both began the tournament shorthanded when each had two players suspended for their roles in a brawl at the World Championship tuneup Acropolis Tournament, held in mid-August. The two teams engaged in a chaotic brawl with 2:40 left when Greece's Antonis Fotsis threatened Serbia's Miloš Teodosić after Teodosić committed a foul. The fight spilled off the floor and into the locker room tunnel; the game was thus terminated with final score the score at the time of the interruption (74–73 for Greece). Serbian center Nenad Krstić was arrested and held overnight for throwing a chair in the brawl.

For their roles in the melee, Krstić was suspended for the first three games of the tournament, while Teodosić, and Greece's Fotsis and Sofoklis Schortsanitis were suspended for the first two games. Both Greek coach Jonas Kazlauskas and Serbian coach Dušan Ivković criticized FIBA for waiting until less than 48 hours before the tournament – over a week after the brawl – to announce the suspensions, citing the unfairness of playing shorthanded for the first games. Greece eventually won their first two games in spite of the suspensions, while Serbia won two of their first three games.

== Preliminary round ==
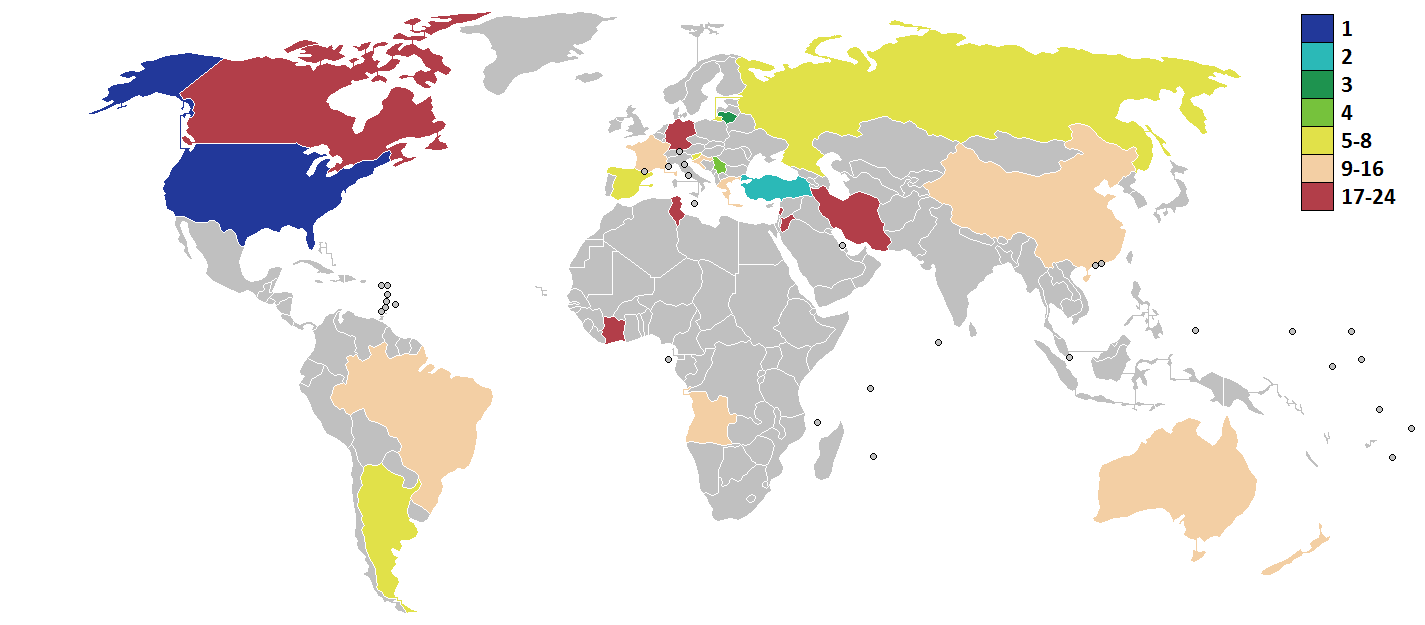
2010 FIBA World Championship final rankings.

The top four finishers in each of the four preliminary round groups advanced to the sixteen team, single-elimination knockout stage, where Group A teams would meet Group B teams and Group C would meet Group D. European teams proved the most successful in the first round, as nine of the ten teams advanced to the knockout stage (only Germany did not progress). Both Oceanian teams qualified for the next round, as did three of the five FIBA Americas teams. The three African and four Asian teams struggled, with only Angola and China reaching the knockout stage after each finished fourth place in their group.

There were few surprises in the early round; each team that advanced to the knockout stage was ranked in the top 20 of the FIBA World Ranking at the time of the tournament. Defending champions Spain struggled early, losing two of their first three games before recovering to finish second in Group D. Argentina and the United States, the two top teams in the FIBA rankings, both cruised to the knockout phase, as the United States went 5–0 and Argentina went 4–1, with their only loss coming to Number 5 ranked Serbia.

=== Tie-breaking procedure ===
At the end of the preliminary round, any ties will be broken by the following criteria, ordered from the one that will be applied first to the last:

1. Game results between tied teams
2. Goal average between games of the tied teams
3. Goal average for all games of the tied teams
4. Drawing of lots

=== Group A (Kayseri) ===
Pos	Team	Pld	W	L	PF	PA	PD	Pts	Qualification
1	Serbia	5	4	1	465	356	+109	9 (Note: Head-to-head record: Serbia 1–0 Argentina)	Eighth–finals
2	Argentina	5	4	1	413	379	+34	9	Eighth–finals
3	Australia	5	3	2	381	341	+40	8	Eighth–finals
4	Angola	5	2	3	340	414	−74	7 (Note: Head-to-head record: Angola 1–0 Germany)	Eighth–finals
5	Germany	5	2	3	378	402	−24	7	
6	Jordan	5	0	5	361	446	−85	5	

Source: FIBA archive
Rules for classification: 1) points; 2) head-to-head points; 3) head-to-head goal average; 4) head-to-head number of points scored.
Notes:

28 August 2010
Australia	76–75		Jordan	Kadir Has Arena, Kayseri
Angola	44–94		Serbia	Kadir Has Arena
Germany	74–78		Argentina	Kadir Has Arena
29 August 2010
Jordan	65–79		Angola	Kadir Has Arena
Serbia	81–82	2OT	Germany	Kadir Has Arena
Argentina	74–72		Australia	Kadir Has Arena
30 August 2010
Jordan	69–112		Serbia	Kadir Has Arena
Australia	78–43		Germany	Kadir Has Arena
Angola	70–91		Argentina	Kadir Has Arena
1 September 2010
Serbia	94–79		Australia	Kadir Has Arena
Germany	88–92	OT	Angola	Kadir Has Arena
Argentina	88–79		Jordan	Kadir Has Arena
2 September 2010
Angola	55–76		Australia	Kadir Has Arena
Argentina	82–84		Serbia	Kadir Has Arena
Jordan	73–91		Germany	Kadir Has Arena

=== Group B (Istanbul) ===
Pos	Team	Pld	W	L	PF	PA	PD	Pts	Qualification
1	United States	5	5	0	455	331	+124	10	Eighth–finals
2	Slovenia	5	4	1	393	376	+17	9	Eighth–finals
3	Brazil	5	3	2	398	354	+44	8	Eighth–finals
4	Croatia	5	2	3	395	407	−12	7	Eighth–finals
5	Iran	5	1	4	301	367	−66	6	
6	Tunisia	5	0	5	300	407	−107	5	

Source: FIBA archive
Rules for classification: 1) points; 2) head-to-head points; 3) head-to-head goal average; 4) head-to-head number of points scored.

28 August 2010
Tunisia	56–80	Slovenia	Abdi İpekçi Arena, Istanbul
United States	106–78	Croatia	Abdi İpekçi Arena
Iran	65–81	Brazil	Abdi İpekçi Arena
29 August 2010
Slovenia	77–99	United States	Abdi İpekçi Arena
Croatia	75–54	Iran	Abdi İpekçi Arena
Brazil	80–65	Tunisia	Abdi İpekçi Arena
30 August 2010
Slovenia	91–84	Croatia	Abdi İpekçi Arena
Tunisia	58–71	Iran	Abdi İpekçi Arena
United States	70–68	Brazil	Abdi İpekçi Arena
1 September 2010
Croatia	84–64	Tunisia	Abdi İpekçi Arena
Iran	51–88	United States	Abdi İpekçi Arena
Brazil	77–80	Slovenia	Abdi İpekçi Arena
2 September 2010
United States	92–57	Tunisia	Abdi İpekçi Arena
Slovenia	65–60	Iran	Abdi İpekçi Arena
Brazil	92–74	Croatia	Abdi İpekçi Arena

=== Group C (Ankara) ===
Pos	Team	Pld	W	L	PF	PA	PD	Pts	Qualification
1	Turkey (H)	5	5	0	393	285	+108	10	Eighth–finals
2	Russia	5	4	1	365	346	+19	9	Eighth–finals
3	Greece	5	3	2	403	370	+33	8	Eighth–finals
4	China	5	1	4	360	422	−62	6 (Note: Head-to-head record: China 1–1 (1.0127 GAvg), Puerto Rico 1–1 (0.9939 GAvg), Ivory Coast 1–1 (0.9938 GAvg))	Eighth–finals
5	Puerto Rico	5	1	4	386	401	−15	6	
6	Ivory Coast	5	1	4	334	417	−83	6	

Source: FIBA archive
Rules for classification: 1) points; 2) head-to-head points; 3) head-to-head goal average; 4) head-to-head number of points scored.
(H) Hosts
Notes:

28 August 2010
Greece	89–81	China	Ankara Arena
Russia	75–66	Puerto Rico	Ankara Arena
Ivory Coast	47–86	Turkey	Ankara Arena
29 August 2010
China	83–73	Ivory Coast	Ankara Arena
Puerto Rico	80–83	Greece	Ankara Arena
Turkey	65–56	Russia	Ankara Arena
31 August 2010
Russia	72–66	Ivory Coast	Ankara Arena
Puerto Rico	84–76	China	Ankara Arena
Greece	65–76	Turkey	Ankara Arena
1 September 2010
China	80–89	Russia	Ankara Arena
Ivory Coast	60–97	Greece	Ankara Arena
Turkey	79–77	Puerto Rico	Ankara Arena
2 September 2010
Puerto Rico	79–88	Ivory Coast	Ankara Arena
Greece	69–73	Russia	Ankara Arena
Turkey	87–40	China	Ankara Arena

=== Group D (Izmir) ===
Pos	Team	Pld	W	L	PF	PA	PD	Pts	Qualification
1	Lithuania	5	5	0	391	341	+50	10	Eighth–finals
2	Spain	5	3	2	420	356	+64	8 (Note: Head-to-head record: Spain 1–1 (1.07 GAvg), New Zealand 1–1 (0.97 GAvg), France 1–1 (0.96 GAvg))	Eighth–finals
3	New Zealand	5	3	2	424	400	+24	8	Eighth–finals
4	France	5	3	2	351	339	+12	8	Eighth–finals
5	Lebanon	5	1	4	339	440	−101	6	
6	Canada	5	0	5	330	379	−49	5	

Source: FIBA archive
Rules for classification: 1) points; 2) head-to-head points; 3) head-to-head goal average; 4) head-to-head number of points scored.
Notes:

28 August 2010
New Zealand	79–92	Lithuania	Halkapınar Sport Hall, İzmir
Canada	71–81	Lebanon	Halkapınar Sport Hall
France	72–66	Spain	Halkapınar Sport Hall
29 August 2010
Lithuania	70–68	Canada	Halkapınar Sport Hall
Lebanon	59–86	France	Halkapınar Sport Hall
Spain	101–84	New Zealand	Halkapınar Sport Hall
31 August 2010
New Zealand	108–76	Lebanon	Halkapınar Sport Hall
France	68–63	Canada	Halkapınar Sport Hall
Spain	73–76	Lithuania	Halkapınar Sport Hall
1 September 2010
Canada	61–71	New Zealand	Halkapınar Sport Hall
Lebanon	57–91	Spain	Halkapınar Sport Hall
Lithuania	69–55	France	Halkapınar Sport Hall
2 September 2010
Spain	89–67	Canada	Halkapınar Sport Hall
Lebanon	66–84	Lithuania	Halkapınar Sport Hall
New Zealand	82–70	France	Halkapınar Sport Hall

== Final round (Istanbul) ==
Round of 16
4 September 2010
Serbia	73
Croatia	72
4 September 2010
Spain	80
Greece	72
5 September 2010
Turkey	95
France	77
5 September 2010
Slovenia	87
Australia	58
6 September 2010
United States	121
Angola	66
6 September 2010
Russia	78
New Zealand	56
7 September 2010
Lithuania	78
China	67
7 September 2010
Argentina	93
Brazil	89

Quarter-finals
8 September 2010
Serbia	92
Spain	89
8 September 2010
Turkey	95
Slovenia	68
9 September 2010
United States	89
Russia	79
9 September 2010
Lithuania	104
Argentina	85

Semi-finals
11 September 2010
Serbia	82
Turkey	83
11 September 2010
United States	89
Lithuania	74

Final
12 September 2010
Turkey	64
United States	81
Third place
12 September 2010
Serbia	88
Lithuania	99

=== Round of 16 ===
4 September
18:00

Report

Serbia	73–72	Croatia
Scoring by quarter: 19–27, 15–9, 20–14, 19–22
Pts: Krstić 16; Rebs: Tepić 7 Asts: Tepić 4		Pts: Popović 21; Rebs: Tomić 8 Asts: Popović 5

Sinan Erdem Dome, Istanbul
Attendance: 15,000

4 September
21:00

Report

Spain	80–72	Greece
Scoring by quarter: 22–19, 15–12, 15–20, 28–21
Pts: Navarro 22; Rebs: Reyes 10; Asts: Rubio 6		Pts: Zisis 16; Rebs: Fotsis 7 Asts: Spanoulis 3

Sinan Erdem Dome, Istanbul
Attendance: 15,000

5 September
18:00

Report

Slovenia	87–58	Australia
Scoring by quarter: 16–8, 26–13, 29–24, 16–13
Pts: Lakovič 19; Rebs: Rizvić 5 Asts: Dragić 8		Pts: Ingles 13; Rebs: Nielsen 8 Asts: Mills 3

Sinan Erdem Dome, Istanbul
Attendance: 15,000

5 September
21:00

Report

Turkey	95–77	France
Scoring by quarter: 19–14, 24–14, 28–17, 24–32
Pts: Türkoğlu 20; Rebs: İlyasova 5 Asts: Tunçeri 3		Pts: Diaw 21; Rebs: Diaw 5 Asts: Piétrus 4

Sinan Erdem Dome, Istanbul
Attendance: 15,000

September 6
18:00

Report

United States	121–66	Angola
Scoring by quarter: 33–13, 32–25, 26–18, 30–10
Pts: Billups 19; Rebs: Odom 8 Asts: Rose, Westbrook 6		Pts: Gomes 21; Rebs: Ambrosio 7 Asts: Morais 4

Sinan Erdem Dome, Istanbul
Attendance: 15,000
Referees: Milivoje Jovcic (SRB), Borys Ryzhyk (UKR), Samir Abaakil (MAR)

6 September
21:00

Report

Russia	78–56	New Zealand
Scoring by quarter: 13–15, 18–12, 20–13, 27–16
Pts: Vorontsevich 18; Rebs: Vorontsevich 11; Asts: Ponkrashov 7		Pts: Penney 21; Rebs: Vukona 5 Asts: Penney 2

Sinan Erdem Dome, Istanbul
Attendance: 15,000

7 September
18:00

Report

Lithuania	78–67	China
Scoring by quarter: 17–22, 26–18, 21–11, 14–16
Pts: Kleiza 30; Rebs: Kleiza 9 Asts: Kalnietis 5		Pts: Liu 21; Rebs: Yi 12; Asts: Wang S, Wang Z 3

Sinan Erdem Dome, Istanbul
Attendance: 15,000

7 September
21:00

Report

Argentina	93–89	Brazil
Scoring by quarter: 25–25, 21–23, 20–18, 27–23
Pts: Scola 37; Rebs: Scola 9 Asts: Prigioni 8		Pts: Huertas 32; Rebs: Splitter 5 Asts: Splitter 2

Sinan Erdem Dome, Istanbul
Attendance: 15,000

=== Quarterfinals ===
8 September
18:00

Report

Serbia	92–89	Spain
Scoring by quarter: 27–23, 22–18, 18–23, 25–25
Pts: Veličković 17; Rebs: Krstić 9 Asts: Teodosić 8		Pts: Navarro 27; Rebs: Garbajosa 6 Asts: Navarro 5

Sinan Erdem Dome, Istanbul
Attendance: 15,000

8 September
21:00

Report

Turkey	95–68	Slovenia
Scoring by quarter: 27–14, 23–17, 21–12, 24–25
Pts: İlyasova 19; Rebs: İlyasova 5 Asts: Türkoğlu 7		Pts: Nachbar 16; Rebs: Brezec 5 Asts: Bečirovič 6

Sinan Erdem Dome, Istanbul
Attendance: 15,000

9 September
18:00

Report

United States	89–79	Russia
Scoring by quarter: 25–25, 19–14, 26–17, 19–23
Pts: Durant 33; Rebs: Odom 12; Asts: Billups 5		Pts: Bykov 17; Rebs: Vorontsevich 12; Asts: Khvostov 5

Sinan Erdem Dome, Istanbul
Attendance: 15,000
Referees: Reynaldo Antonio Mercedes Sanchez (DOM), José Martín (ESP), Jakob Zamojski (POL)

9 September
21:00

Report

Lithuania	104–85	Argentina
Scoring by quarter: 28–18, 22–12, 35–23, 19–32
Pts: Jasaitis 19; Rebs: Kleiza 9 Asts: Jankūnas 5		Pts: Delfino 25; Rebs: Oberto 5 Asts: Prigioni 6

Sinan Erdem Dome, Istanbul
Attendance: 15,000

=== 5th–8th classification ===
Classification round
10 September 2010
Spain	97
Slovenia	80
10 September 2010
Russia	61
Argentina	73

Fifth place
12 September 2010
Spain	81
Argentina	86
Seventh place
11 September 2010
Slovenia	78
Russia	83

==== Semifinals ====
10 September
18:00

Report

Spain	97–80	Slovenia
Scoring by quarter: 16–23, 22–18, 26–21, 33–18
Pts: Navarro 26; Rebs: Reyes 10; Asts: Navarro 7		Pts: Lakovič 19; Rebs: Brezec 9 Asts: Lakovič 4

Sinan Erdem Dome, Istanbul
Attendance: 15,000

10 September
21:00

Report

Russia	61–73	Argentina
Scoring by quarter: 11–15, 22–21, 19–18, 9–19
Pts: Monia 17; Rebs: Mozgov 11; Asts: Ponkrashov 4		Pts: Scola 27; Rebs: Delfino 7 Asts: Prigioni 5

Sinan Erdem Dome, Istanbul
Attendance: 15,000

==== Seventh place playoff ====
11 September
15:00

7th place
Report

Slovenia	78–83	Russia
Scoring by quarter: 23–21, 14–9, 22–22, 19–31
Pts: Nachbar 20; Rebs: Slokar 7 Asts: Dragić 7		Pts: Mozgov 19; Rebs: Monia 7 Asts: Bykov 7

Sinan Erdem Dome, Istanbul
Attendance: 15,000

==== Fifth place playoff ====
12 September
15:00

5th place
Report

Spain	81–86	Argentina
Scoring by quarter: 16–23, 16–26, 30–16, 19–21
Pts: Fernández 31; Rebs: M. Gasol 10; Asts: Navarro 3		Pts: Delfino 27; Rebs: Scola 11; Asts: Prigioni 7

Sinan Erdem Dome, Istanbul
Attendance: 15,000

=== Semifinals ===
11 September
19:00

Report

United States	89–74	Lithuania
Scoring by quarter: 23–12, 19–15, 23–26, 24–21
Pts: Durant 38; Rebs: Odom 10; Asts: Billups, Rose, Westbrook 3		Pts: Javtokas 15; Rebs: Javtokas 9 Asts: Kalnietis, Mačiulis, Pocius, Delininkaitis 2

Sinan Erdem Dome, Istanbul
Attendance: 15,000
Referees: Carl Jungebrand (FIN), Sasa Pukl (SLO), Marcos Fornies Benito (BRA)

11 September
21:30

Report

Serbia	82–83	Turkey
Scoring by quarter: 20–17, 22–18, 21–25, 19–23
Pts: Kešelj 18; Rebs: Krstić 7 Asts: Teodosić 11		Pts: Türkoğlu 16; Rebs: Aşık 7 Asts: Tunçeri 5

Sinan Erdem Dome, Istanbul
Attendance: 15,000

=== Third place playoff ===
12 September
19:00

Report

Serbia	88–99	Lithuania
Scoring by quarter: 22–23, 16–25, 16–24, 34–27
Pts: Veličković 18; Rebs: Krstić 8 Asts: Rašić 10		Pts: Kleiza 33; Rebs: Jasaitis 10; Asts: Kalnietis 5

Sinan Erdem Dome, Istanbul
Attendance: 15,000

=== Final ===
12 September
21:30

Report

Turkey	64–81	United States
Scoring by quarter: 17–22, 15–20, 16–19, 16–20
Pts: Türkoğlu 16; Rebs: İlyasova 11; Asts: Tunçeri 5		Pts: Durant 28; Rebs: Odom 11; Asts: Rose 6

Sinan Erdem Dome, Istanbul
Attendance: 15,000
Referees: Cristiano Jesus Maranho (BRA), Luigi Lamonica (ITA), Juan Arteaga (ESP)

== Statistical leaders ==
=== Individual tournament highs ===
Points

Pos.	Name	G	Pts	PPG
1	(Argentina) Luis Scola	9	244	27.1
2	(New Zealand) Kirk Penney	6	148	24.7
3	(United States) Kevin Durant	9	205	22.8
4	(Argentina) Carlos Delfino	9	185	20.6
5	(China) Yi Jianlian	5	101	20.2
6	(Iran) Hamed Haddadi	5	100	20
7	(Lithuania) Linas Kleiza	9	171	19
8	(Spain) Juan Carlos Navarro	8	135	16.9
9	(Puerto Rico) José Barea	5	84	16.8
10	(Brazil) Leandro Barbosa	6	97	16.2

Rebounds

Pos.	Name	G	Reb.	RPG
1	(China) Yi Jianlian	5	51	10.2
2	(Iran) Hamed Haddadi	5	43	8.6
3	(Jordan) Zaid Abbas	5	42	8.4
4	(Argentina) Luis Scola	9	71	7.9
5	(United States) Lamar Odom	9	69	7.7
6	(Turkey) Ersan İlyasova	8	61	7.6
7	(Canada) Levon Kendall	5	38	7.6
8	(Serbia) Nenad Krstić	6	45	7.5
9	(Iran) Arsalan Kazemi	5	37	7.4
9	(Australia) David Andersen	5	37	7.4

Assists

Pos.	Name	G	Ass.	APG
1	(Argentina) Pablo Prigioni	9	58	6.4
2	(Brazil) Marcelinho Huertas	6	35	5.8
3	(Serbia) Miloš Teodosić	7	39	5.6
4	(Jordan) Osama Daghlas	5	28	5.6
5	(Puerto Rico) José Barea	5	27	5.4
6	(Spain) Ricky Rubio	9	46	5.1
6	(Russia) Anton Ponkrashov	9	46	5.1
8	(Ivory Coast) Mouloukou Diabate	5	22	4.4
9	(Australia) Patrick Mills	6	25	4.2
10	(Slovenia) Goran Dragić	9	37	4.1

Blocks

Pos.	Name	G	Blocks	BPG
1	(Ivory Coast) Mamadou Lamizana	5	16	3.2
2	(Iran) Hamed Haddadi	5	13	2.6
3	(Spain) Marc Gasol	9	21	2.3
4	(Canada) Joel Anthony	5	11	2.2
4	(Tunisia) Salah Mejri	5	11	2.2
6	(Spain) Fran Vázquez	9	14	1.6
7	(Russia) Sergey Monya	9	12	1.3
8	(Turkey) Ömer Aşık	9	11	1.2
9	(Russia) Timofey Mozgov	9	9	1
10	(Australia) Matthew Nielsen	6	6	1

Steals

Pos.	Name	G	Stls	SPG
1	(Iran) Arsalan Kazemi	5	14	2,8
2	(Lebanon) Ali Mahmoud	5	13	2.6
3	(Ivory Coast) Mouloukou Diabate	5	12	2.4
4	(Turkey) Sinan Güler	8	17	2.1
5	(Argentina) Carlos Delfino	9	18	2
5	(Argentina) Pablo Prigioni	9	18	2
7	(Brazil) Leandro Barbosa	6	12	2
7	(China) Sun Yue	6	12	2
9	(Tunisia) Makrem Ben Romdhane	4	8	2
9	(Angola) Olimpio Cipriano	4	8	2

Minutes

Pos.	Name	G	Min.	MPG
1	(Argentina) Carlos Delfino	9	327	36.3
2	(China) Liu Wei	5	180	36
3	(Argentina) Luis Scola	9	323	35.9
4	(Ivory Coast) Mouloukou Diabate	5	177	35.4
5	(China) Yi Jianlian	5	175	35
6	(Jordan) Osama Daghlas	5	172	34.4
7	(Jordan) Rasheim Wright	5	169	33.8
8	(Iran) Hamed Haddadi	5	163	32.6
9	(Iran) Javad Davari	5	161	32.2
9	(Lebanon) Fadi El Khatib	5	161	32.2

=== Individual game highs ===
Department	Name	Total	Opponent
Points	(United States) Kevin Durant	38	Lithuania (9/11)
Rebounds	(Angola) Joaquim Gomes (Russia) Sasha Kaun (Iran) Arsalan Kazemi (China) Yi Jianlian	14	Germany (9/1) (OT); China (9/1); Slovenia (9/2); Greece (8/28)
Assists	(Russia) Anton Ponkrashov (Spain) Ricky Rubio (Serbia) Miloš Teodosić	11	Puerto Rico (8/28); New Zealand (8/29); Turkey (9/11)
Steals	(Turkey) Sinan Güler	8	China (9/2)
Blocks	(Iran) Hamed Haddadi (Ivory Coast) Herve Lamizana (Ivory Coast) Herve Lamizana (Tunisia) Salah Mejri	5	Brazil (8/28); Puerto Rico (9/2); Turkey (8/28); Brazil (8/29)
Field goal percentage	(Spain) Fran Vázquez	100% (9/9)	Canada (9/2)
3-point field goal percentage	(Turkey) Ersan İlyasova	100% (6/6)	Greece (8/31)
Free throw percentage	(Russia) Anton Ponkrashov	100% (10/10)	Puerto Rico (8/28)
Turnovers	(United States) Kevin Durant	7	Brazil (8/30)

=== Team tournament highs ===
Offensive PPG

Pos.	Name	PPG
1	United States	92.8
2	Spain	88.9
3	Argentina	85.2
4	Lithuania	83.3
5	Serbia	82.9

Defensive PPG

Pos.	Name	PPG
1	United States	65.9
2	Russia	68.2
3	Turkey	71.3
4	France	71.3
5	Australia	72.3

Rebounds

Pos.	Name	RPG
1	United States	41.7
2	Greece	40.4
3	Lithuania	37.8
4	Serbia	37.2
5	Puerto Rico	37

Assists

Pos.	Name	APG
1	United States	18.2
1	Spain	18.2
3	Russia	18.1
4	Turkey	16.6
5	Serbia	16

Steals

Pos.	Name	SPG
1	United States	10.4
2	Turkey	8.4
3	Brazil	8.2
4	Lebanon	8.1
5	Ivory Coast	7.8

Blocks

Pos.	Name	BPG
1	United States	4.9
2	Spain	4.8
3	Russia	4
4	Lebanon	3.8
5	Ivory Coast	3.4

=== Team game highs ===
Department	Name	Total	Opponent
Points	United States	121	Angola (9/6)
Rebounds	United States; Lithuania	50	Slovenia (8/29); China (9/7)
Assists	United States	30	Angola (9/6)
Steals	Turkey; United States	15	Ivory Coast (8/28); Brazil (8/30)
Blocks	Spain	9	Canada (9/2)
Field goal percentage	Turkey	66.7% (32/48)	Slovenia (9/8)
3-point field goal percentage	Argentina	61.1% (11/18)	Brazil (9/7)
Free throw percentage	United States	100.0% (10/10)	Tunisia (9/2)
Turnovers	Iran; Jordan	25	United States (9/1); Angola (8/29)

== Final standings ==
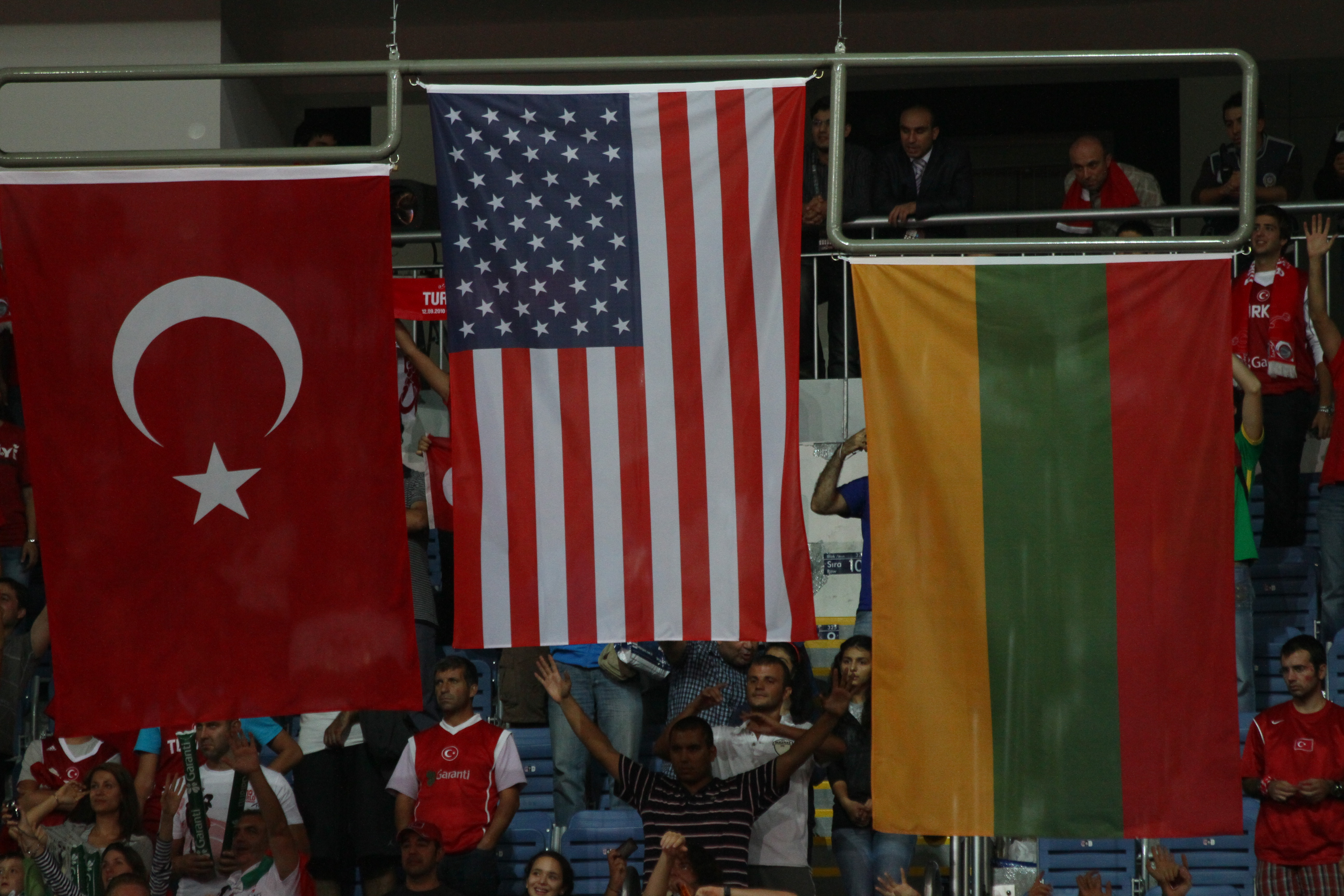
Flag of the top three teams at the medal ceremony

Method of breaking ties:

- Result of classification game
- Place in preliminary round group
- Winning percentage
- Overall points average

Rank	Team	Record
1st place, gold medalist(s)	United States	9–0
2nd place, silver medalist(s)	Turkey	8–1
3rd place, bronze medalist(s)	Lithuania	8–1
4	Serbia	6–3
5	Argentina	7–2
6	Spain	5–4
7	Russia	6–3
8	Slovenia	5–4
9	Brazil	3–3
10	Australia	3–3
11	Greece	3–3
12	New Zealand	3–3
13	France	3–3
14	Croatia	2–4
15	Angola	2–4
16	China	1–5
17	Germany	2–3
18	Puerto Rico	1–4
19	Iran	1–4
20	Lebanon	1–4
21	Ivory Coast	1–4
22	Canada	0–5
23	Jordan	0–5
24	Tunisia	0–5

== Awards ==
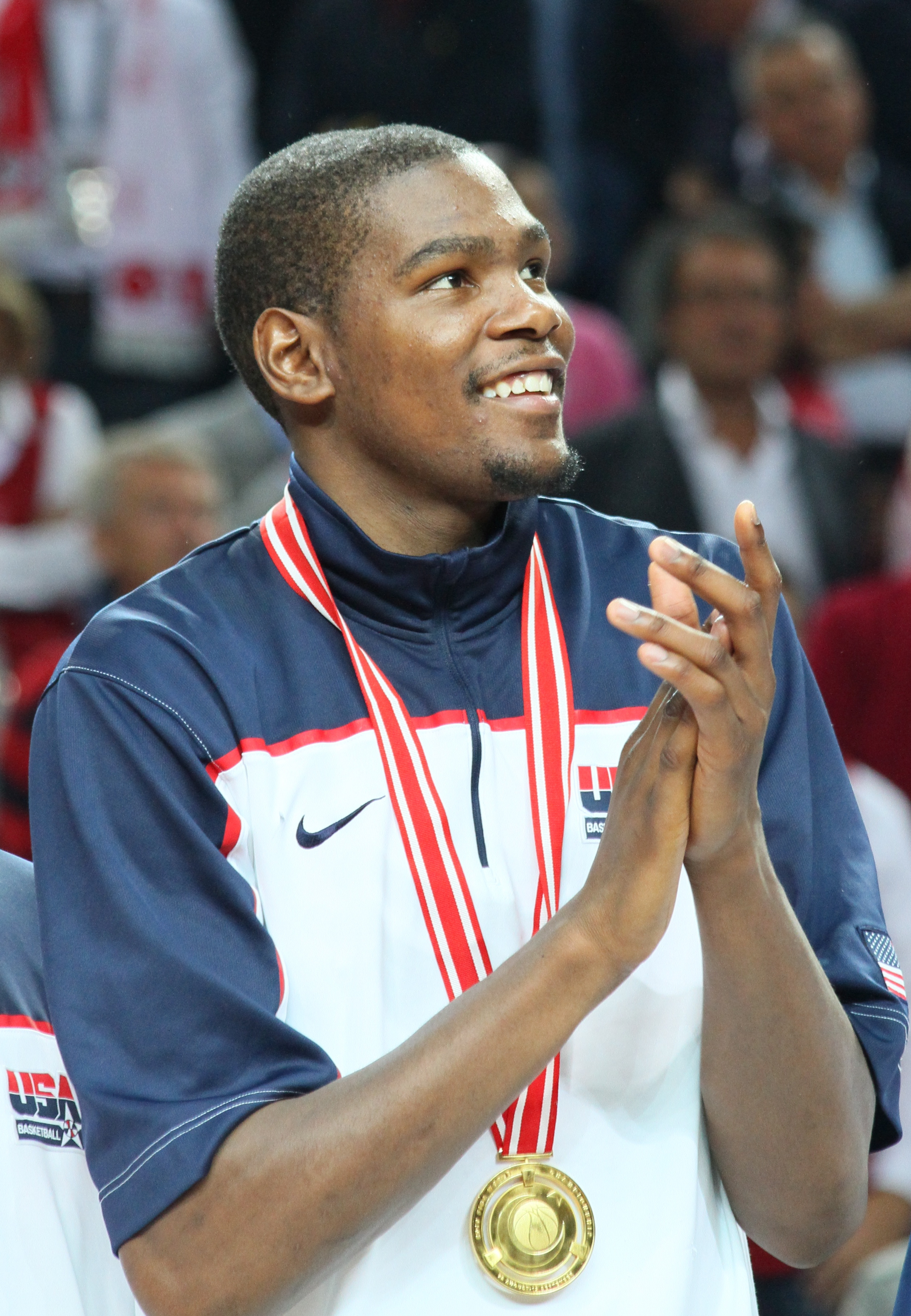
Kevin Durant was named MVP

2010 FIBA World Championship winner

United States
4th title

Most Valuable Player
(United States) Kevin Durant

=== All-Tournament Team ===
- (Argentina) Luis Scola
- (Lithuania) Linas Kleiza
- (United States) Kevin Durant – MVP
- (Turkey) Hedo Türkoğlu
- (Serbia) Miloš Teodosić

== Referees ==
On 18 August 2010, FIBA named the forty referees that officiated at the tournament. Below are the referees, along with the first round group that each was assigned to:

- Group A
  - MAR Samir Abaakil
  - ESP Juan Arteaga
  - TUR Murat Biricik
  - PUR José Aníbal Carrión
  - ITA Guerrino Cerebuch
  - BRA Marcos Fornies Benito
  - USA Bill Kennedy
  - LVA Oļegs Latiševs
  - CHN Qiao Longsheng
  - FRA Eddie Viator
- Group B
  - TUR Recep Ankaralı
  - LTU Romualdas Brazauskas
  - FRA David Chambon
  - GRC Christos Christodoulou
  - JPN Yuji Hirahara
  - AGO Carlos José Julio
  - ESP José Martín
  - COL José Hernán Melgarejo Pinto
  - DOM Reynaldo Antonio Mercedes Sánchez
  - CAN Stephen Seibel
- Group C
  - SRB Ilija Belošević
  - AUS Scott Jason Butler
  - LBN Marwan Egho
  - ARG Pablo Alberto Estévez
  - KEN Vitalis Odhiambo Gode
  - FIN Carl Jungebrand
  - BRA Cristiano Jesus Maranho
  - SVN Saša Pukl
  - PRT Fernando Rocha
  - VEN Héctor Sánchez
- Group D
  - IRN Heros Avanessian
  - AUS Michael Aylen
  - USA Anthony Dewayne Jordan
  - HRV Srđan Dožai
  - ARG Juan José Fernández
  - SRB Milivoje Jovčić
  - ITA Luigi Lamonica
  - UKR Borys Ryschyk
  - PUR Jorge Vázquez
  - POL Jakub Zamojski

== Mascot ==
The official mascot of the 2010 FIBA World Championship in Turkey was Bascat, a character based on the famous Turkish Van cat. He was designed as a white feline with one blue eye and one green eye, known for being energetic and sometimes acting like a dog.

== Broadcasting ==
=== Rights ===
FIBA announced that the championship will be shown in 183 countries, beating the record set be the 2006 championship which was 132. Countries that aired the championship for the first time were India and the United Kingdom, while Canada covered the event for the first time since hosting the 1994 FIBA World Championship.

=== TV ratings ===
According to FIBA secretary general Patrick Baumann, the TV ratings for the 2010 championship exceeded the 2006 FIBA World Championship's and the FIBA EuroBasket 2009 numbers, with an expected audience close to 1 billion people in 200 countries, while 30 million people visited the official website.

The preliminary round game between China and Greece was watched by around 65 million Chinese.

The U.S. TV ratings for the Final between the U.S. and Turkey, on the other hand, was watched by less than 900,000 viewers in American cable network ESPN, worse than the average audience of the broadcast of the 2009-10 NBA season, but double than the airing of the first game of the 2010 WNBA Finals on its sister terrestrial network ABC which was aired on the same timeslot.

=== List of broadcasters ===
TV broadcasters

Country	Broadcaster
Albania	Top Channel
Angola	TPA
Argentina	TV Pública; TyC Sports; DIRECTV Sports
Australia	Fox Sports
Belgium	BeTV
Bosnia and Herzegovina	BHRT
Brazil	TV E+I; SporTV; ESPN Brasil; BandSports
Bulgaria	BNT
Canada	TSN
China	CCTV
Croatia	HRT
Cyprus	Lumiere TV; Alfa TV
Czech Republic	Czech Television; Sport 1
Denmark	TV 2 Sport

Country	Broadcaster
Estonia	TV6; Viasat Sport
Finland	Nelonen Sport Pro
France	Sport+
Germany	Sport1
Greece	ERT
Hong Kong	iCable Sports
Hungary	Sport 1
India	TEN Sports
Italy	RAI
Japan	J Sports
Lebanon	LBC
Lithuania	TV3; Viasat Sport
Macau	TDM
Malaysia	Astro
Macedonia	Sitel
Montenegro	RTCG
Mongolia	TV9
New Zealand	Sky Sports

Country	Broadcaster
Philippines	Solar TV; BTV
Poland	TVP
Portugal	Sport TV
Qatar	Al Jazeera Sports
Romania	Sport 1
South Africa	SuperSport
Russia	NTV Plus
Serbia	RTS
Slovakia	STV; Sport 1
Slovenia	RTVSLO; Šport TV
Spain	LaSexta; MARCA TV
Sweden	Viasat Sport
Taiwan	Videoland
Turkey	NTV; NTV Spor; HDen
United Kingdom	ESPN
United States	ESPN; NBA TV

== See also ==
- 2010 FIBA World Championship for Women
- 2010 Wheelchair Basketball World Championship
