= Brice Assie =

French basketball player (born 1983)

San Martin Corrientes
- Position: Power forward
- League: Argentine League

Personal information
- Born: 3 June 1983 (age 43) Koumassi, Côte d'Ivoire
- Listed height: 6 ft 8 in (2.03 m)
- Listed weight: 176 lb (80 kg)

Career information
- Playing career: 2005–present

Brice Assie (born 3 June 1983 in Koumassi, Côte d'Ivoire) is a Côte d'Ivoirean-French basketball player currently playing for San Martin Corrientes in Argentina. He is also a member of the Côte d'Ivoire national basketball team.

Assie played NCAA Division III basketball for Western Connecticut State University. He averaged twenty points and nine rebounds per game for the team, while leading them to the NCAA Tournament three of his four years. Following his senior season, he was named Little East Conference Basketball Player of the Year for 2005-06.

After turning professional, Assie has played for numerous teams throughout the world, including teams in Finland, Turkey, and Argentina. Currently, he plays for San Martin Corrientes in Argentina. Assie is also a member of the Côte d'Ivoire national basketball team and played for the team for the first time at the 2010 FIBA World Championship in Turkey.
