= Kadir Has Spor Salonu =

Indoor arena in Kayseri, Turkey

Coordinates: 38.733816°N 35.421703°E

Kadir Has Sport Hall
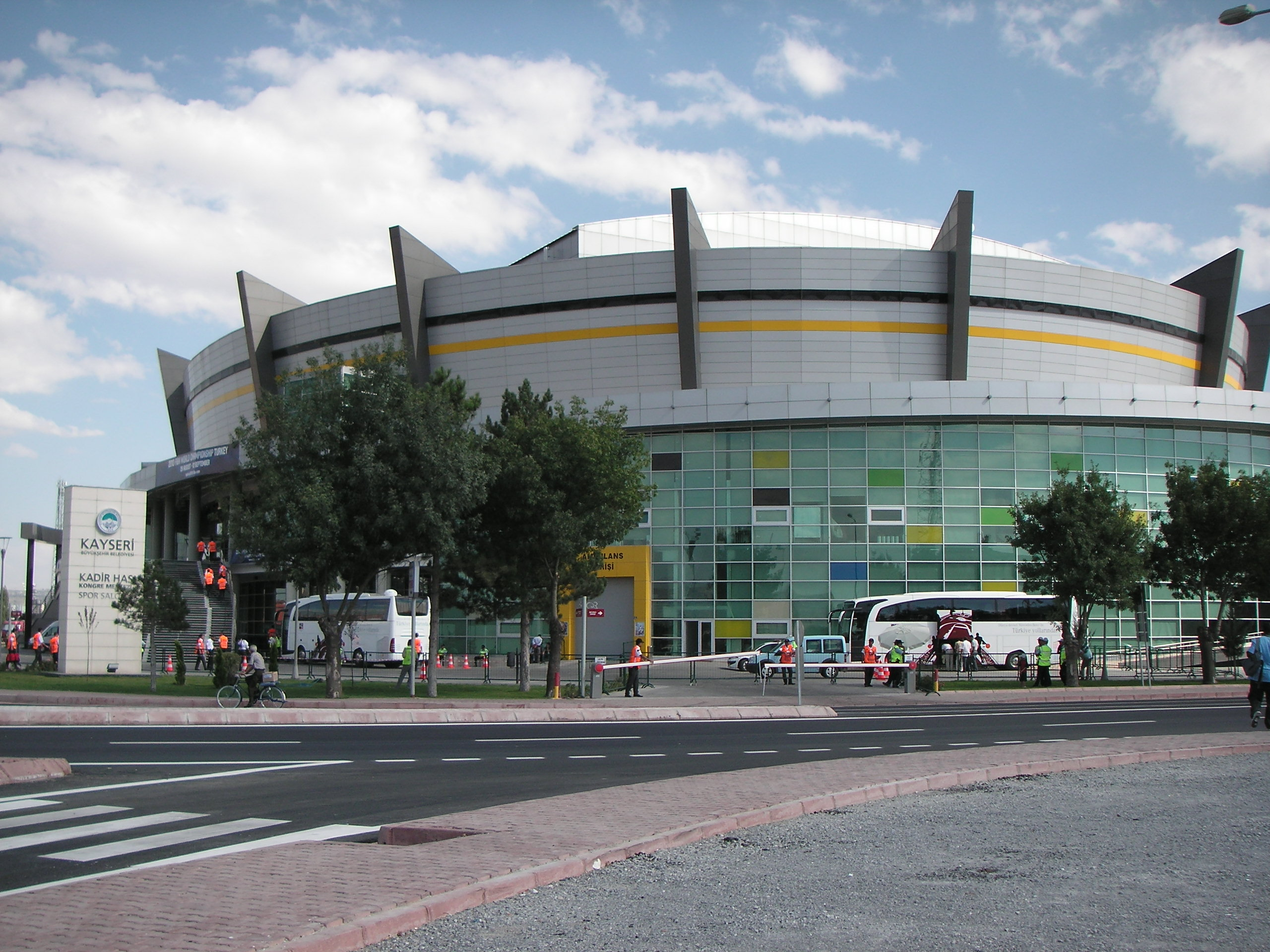
- Interactive map of Kadir Has Sport Hall
- Location: Kayseri, Turkey
- Owner: Kayseri Kaski Spor Kulübü
- Capacity: Basketball: 7,200

Construction
- Opened: 2008
- Architect: Ofiss Mimarca

Kadir Has Sport Hall (Turkish: Kadir Has Spor Salonu) is an indoor sporting arena that is located in Kayseri, Turkey. Together with Kayseri Kadir Has Stadium, it is a part of the Kayseri Kadir Has Sports Complex, one of the newest sports complexes in Turkey. Completed in 2008, the capacity of the arena is 7,200 spectators.

== History ==
Upon the withdrawal of the Antalya Arena project, the venue was appointed to be one of the five basketball halls selected for the 2010 FIBA World Championship. The arena had a crucial role in Turkey's organization of the 2010 FIBA World Championship.

== See also ==
- Kadir Has Stadium
- List of indoor arenas in Turkey
