= Sergei Monia =

Russian basketball player (born 1983)

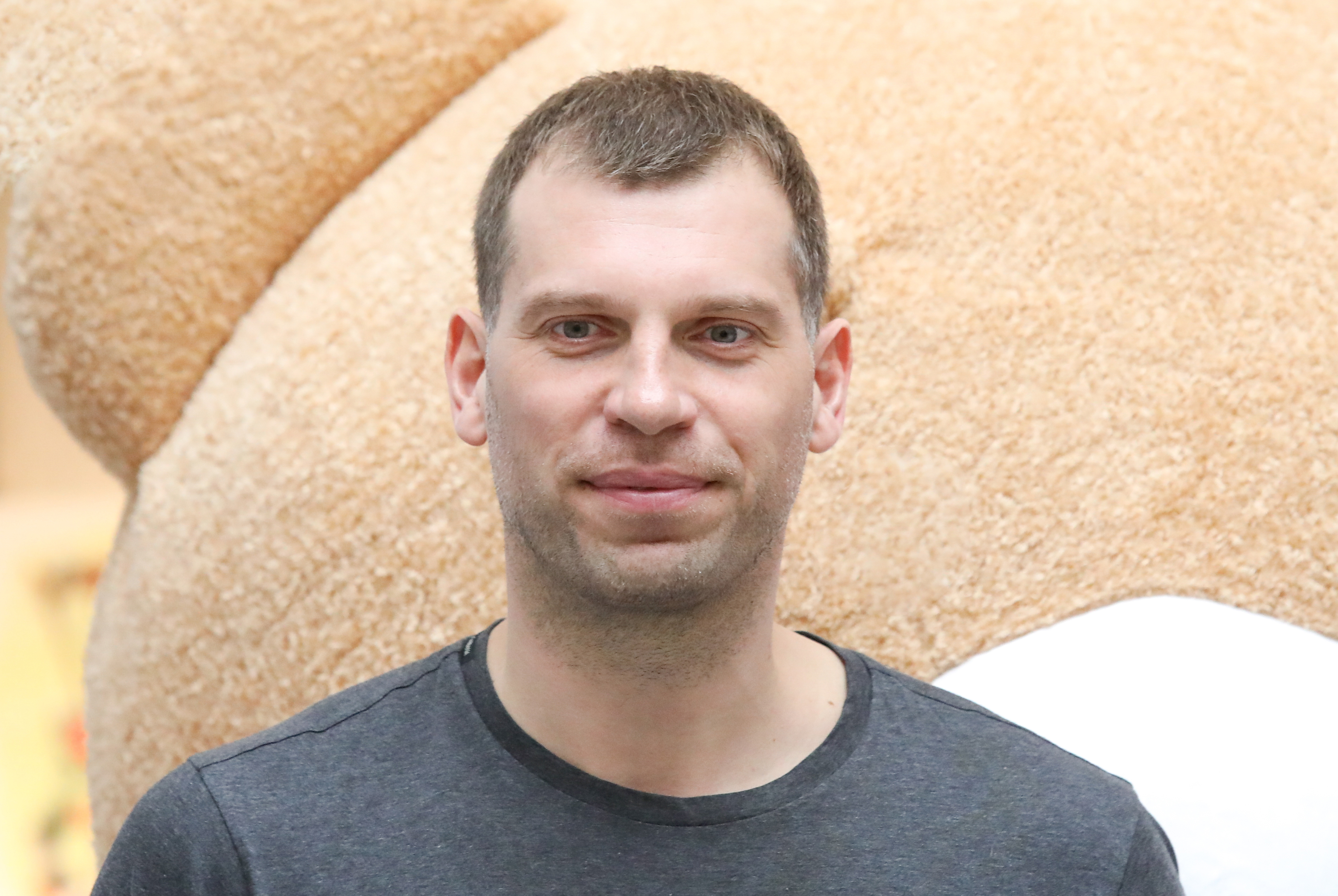

Personal information
- Born: 15 April 1983 (age 43) Saratov, Russian SFSR, Soviet Union
- Listed height: 6 ft 8 in (2.03 m)
- Listed weight: 220 lb (100 kg)

Career information
- NBA draft: 2004: 1st round, 23rd overall pick
- Drafted by: Portland Trail Blazers
- Playing career: 2000–2022
- Position: Small forward / power forward
- Number: 12, 15

Career history
- 2000–2002: Avtodor Saratov
- 2002–2005: CSKA Moscow
- 2005–2006: Portland Trail Blazers
- 2006: →Fort Worth Flyers
- 2006: Sacramento Kings
- 2006–2010: Dynamo Moscow
- 2010–2021: Khimki
- 2022: Zenit Saint Petersburg

Career highlights
- 2× EuroCup champion (2012, 2015); 3× Russian League champion (2003–2005); Russian Cup winner (2005); 2× VTB League champion (2011, 2022); All-VTB United League Second Team (2014); Russian League All-Symbolic First Team (2011); 2× Russian League All-Star (2007, 2011); Russian League All-Star Game MVP (2011)
- Stats at NBA.com
- Stats at Basketball Reference
Medals
Men's basketball
Representing Russia Russia
Summer Olympics
| Bronze medal – third place | 2012 London |
FIBA EuroBasket
| Gold medal – first place | 2007 Spain |
| Bronze medal – third place | 2011 Lithuania |

Sergei Alexandrovich Monia (Russian: Сергей Александрович Моня; born 15 April 1983) is a Russian former professional basketball player. He was selected by the National Basketball Association (NBA) club the Portland Trail Blazers, in the first round (23rd overall) of the 2004 NBA draft. At a height of 2.02 m (6 ft 7 1/2 in) tall, he played at both the small forward and power forward positions.

== Professional career ==
Monia played briefly for the Portland Trail Blazers and the Sacramento Kings, during the 2005–06 NBA season, playing in 26 games and averaging 3 points per game, in 13 minutes per game.

On 23 February 2006 Monia and Seattle SuperSonics' center Vitaly Potapenko, were traded to the Kings, in exchange for power forward Brian Skinner (who ended up with the Trail Blazers), in a three-team deal. Monia saw action in only three games for the Kings, and was waived on 28 July 2006, because of his desire to play professionally in the Russian Superleague A for Dynamo Moscow.

In June 2010, Monia signed a two-year deal with the Russian club Khimki. With them, he won the EuroCup championship in 2012. In June 2012, he extended his contract with Khimki, for two more years. On 6 March 2015 he signed a new three-year contract extension with Khimki.

On 13 June 2023, Monia announced his retirement.

== National team career ==
Monia has also been a member of the senior Russian national basketball team. With the Russian national team, he played at the EuroBasket 2003, the EuroBasket 2005, the 2008 Summer Olympics, the EuroBasket 2009, the 2010 FIBA World Championship, the EuroBasket 2013, and the EuroBasket 2015. He also won a gold medal at the EuroBasket 2007, a bronze medal at the EuroBasket 2011, and a bronze at the 2012 Summer Olympics.

== Career statistics ==
Legend
| GP | Games played | GS | Games started | MPG | Minutes per game |
| FG% | Field goal percentage | 3P% | 3-point field goal percentage | FT% | Free throw percentage |
| RPG | Rebounds per game | APG | Assists per game | SPG | Steals per game |
| BPG | Blocks per game | PPG | Points per game | **Bold** | Career high |

=== NBA ===
==== Regular season ====
| Year | Team | GP | GS | MPG | FG% | 3P% | FT% | RPG | APG | SPG | BPG | PPG |
|---|---|---|---|---|---|---|---|---|---|---|---|---|
| 2005–06 | Portland | **23** | **15** | **14.6** | **.341** | **.273** | .667 | **2.2** | **.8** | **.3** | **.2** | **3.3** |
| 2005–06 | Sacramento | 3 | 0 | 2.3 | .000 | .000 | **1.000** | .3 | .0 | **.3** | .0 | .7 |
| Career | | 26 | 15 | 13.2 | .333 | .265 | .714 | 2.0 | .7 | .3 | .2 | 3.0 |
