= Kerem Tunçeri =

Turkish basketball player

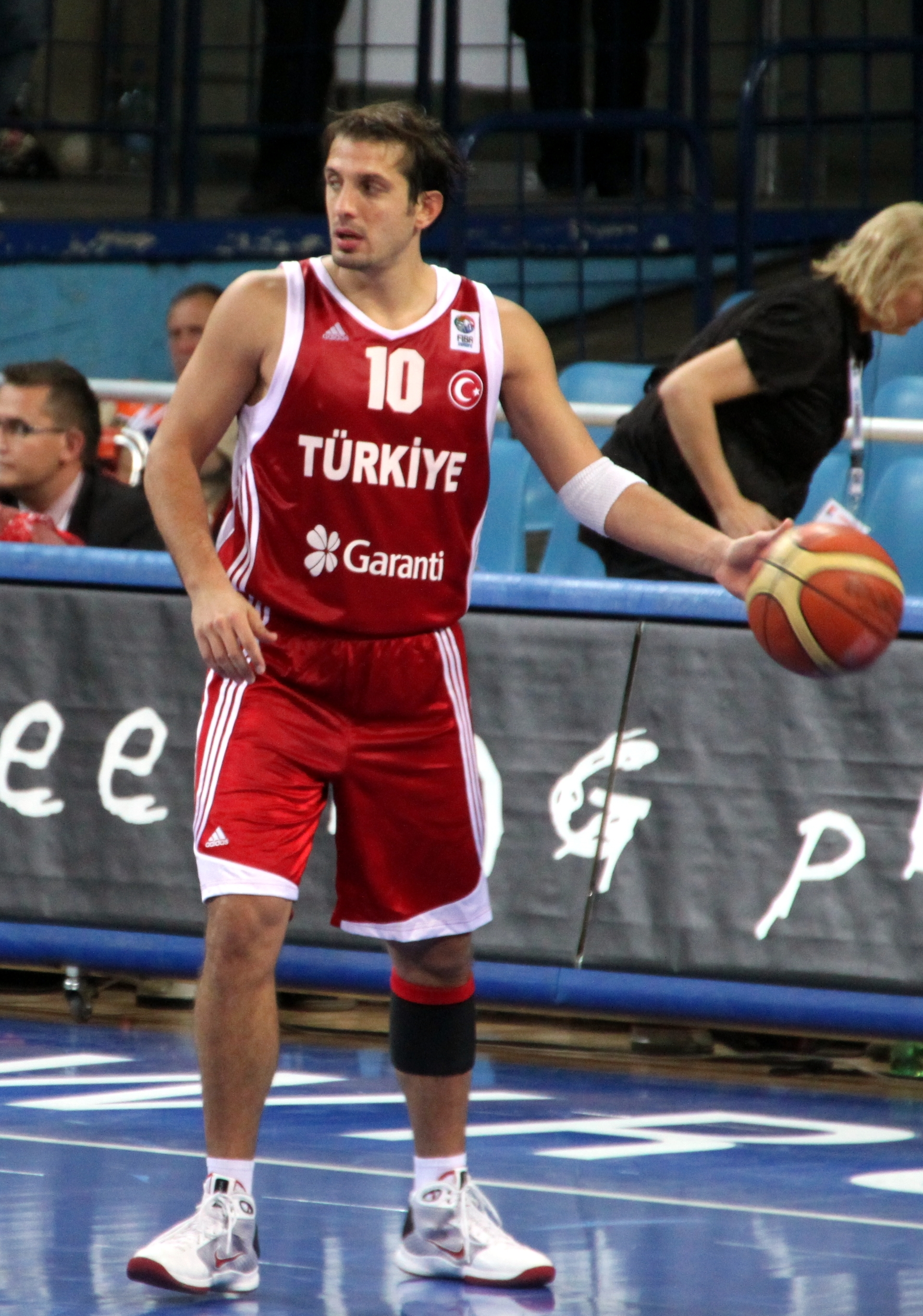
- Tunçeri with the Turkish national team, 2009

Personal information
- Born: 14 April 1979 (age 47) Istanbul, Turkey
- Listed height: 1.94 m (6 ft 4 1/2 in)
- Listed weight: 190 lb (86 kg)

Career information
- Playing career: 1997–2016
- Position: Point guard
- Number: 10, 4, 5, 19

Career history
- 1997–1999: Galatasaray
- 1999–2004: Efes Pilsen
- 2004–2005: Ülkerspor
- 2005–2006: Beşiktaş
- 2006–2008: Real Madrid
- 2008–2009: Triumph Lyubertsy
- 2009–2013: Anadolu Efes
- 2013–2014: Türk Telekom
- 2014–2015: Beşiktaş
- 2015–2016: Acıbadem Üniversitesi

Mehmet Kerem Tunçeri (born 14 April 1979) is a Turkish former professional basketball player who played at the point guard and shooting guard positions. He is 194 cm (6 ft 4 in) in height and 86 kg (190 lbs.) in weight.

== National team career ==
Tunçeri was a regular member of the Turkish national team. He won the silver medal at the 2001 FIBA European Championship. He played at the 2002 FIBA World Championship. He was also a key member of the Turkish national team that won the silver medal at 2010 FIBA World Championship.

== Post-playing career ==
=== Galatasaray ===
In August 2021, Tunceri was appointed as General Director of Basketball for Galatasaray Sports Club.

It was announced that Tunçeri, who assumed the post of General Director on 18 January 2023, resigned.

== Honours ==
=== Club ===
Efes Pilsen

- Turkish League: 2002, 2003, 2004, 2009
- Turkish Presidential Cup: 2009

Real Madrid

- Liga ACB: 2007
- ULEB Cup: 2007

=== International ===
Turkey

- (silver) 2001 FIBA European Championship
- (silver) 2010 FIBA World Championship

=== Individual ===
- TBL Assist Leader: 2006
- TBL MVP: 2006
- Turkish Presidential Cup MVP: 2009

== Personal life ==
In 2007, Tunçeri married Tuba Çıkrıkçı. While still married, he started a relationship with Peray Özdil who gave birth to his child. Tunçeri and Çıkrıkçı later divorced. He has since dated several celebrities in Turkey.
