= List of 2018–19 EuroLeague transactions =

This is a list of all personnel changes for the 2018 EuroLeague off-season and 2018–19 EuroLeague season (until 28 February 2019).

== Retirements ==
The following players who played in the 2017–18 Euroleague, and played more than three EuroLeague seasons, retired.

Date	Name	EuroLeague Team(s) and played (years)	Age	Notes	Ref.
August 17	(Spain) Juan Carlos Navarro	(Spain) FC Barcelona (1997-2007, 2008-2018)	38	2× EuroLeague champion (2003, 2010); EuroLeague MVP (2009); EuroLeague Final Four MVP (2010); EuroLeague Top Scorer (2007); 5× All-EuroLeague First Team (2006, 2007, 2009–2011); 2× All-EuroLeague Second Team (2012, 2013); EuroLeague 2001–10 All-Decade Team (2010); EuroLeague Legend (2014)	

== Managerial changes ==
Team	Outgoing manager	Manner of departure	Date of vacancy	Position in table	Replaced with	Date of appointment
(Spain) Herbalife Gran Canaria	(Spain) Luis Casimiro	End of contract	13 June 2018	Pre-season	(Spain) Salva Maldonado	26 June 2018
(Turkey) Darüşşafaka	(Israel) David Blatt	End of contract	31 May 2018	Pre-season	(Turkey) Ahmet Çakı	20 June 2018
(Greece) Olympiacos	(Greece) Ioannis Sfairopoulos	Mutual consent	18 June 2018	Pre-season	(Israel) David Blatt	27 June 2018
(Spain) Kirolbet Baskonia	(Spain) Pedro Martinez	Sacked	16 November 2018	11th (2–5)	(Croatia) Velimir Perasović	16 November 2018
(Israel) Maccabi Tel Aviv	(Croatia) Neven Spahija	Sacked	18 November 2018	14th (1–6)	(Greece) Ioannis Sfairopoulos	18 November 2018
(Spain) Herbalife Gran Canaria	(Spain) Salva Maldonado	Sacked	5 December 2018	13th (3–7)	(Spain) Víctor García	5 December 2018
(Turkey) Darüşşafaka Tekfen	(Turkey) Ahmet Çakı	Sacked	11 December 2018	16th (1–10)	(Turkey) Selçuk Ernak	12 December 2018
(Greece) Panathinaikos OPAP Athens	(Spain) Xavi Pascual	Sacked	20 December 2018	10th (6–7)	(United States) Rick Pitino	22 December 2018
(Montenegro) Budućnost VOLI	(Serbia) Aleksandar Džikić	Sacked	29 December 2018	15th (3–12)	(Croatia) Jasmin Repeša	30 December 2018
(Russia) Khimki	(Greece) Georgios Bartzokas	Sacked	21 January 2019	13th (7–12)	(Lithuania) Rimas Kurtinaitis	21 January 2019
(Spain) Herbalife Gran Canaria	(Spain) Víctor García	Sacked	11 March 2019	14th (6–19)	(Spain) Pedro Martínez	11 March 2019

== Player movements ==
=== Between two EuroLeague teams ===
Date	Player	From	To	Contract years	Ref.
June 13	(France) Edwin Jackson	(Spain) Barcelona	(Montenegro) Budućnost	1	
June 20	(Serbia) Vasilije Micić	(Lithuania) Žalgiris	(Turkey) Anadolu Efes	2	
June 21	(France) Rodrigue Beaubois	(Spain) Baskonia	(Turkey) Anadolu Efes	2	
June 25	(Turkey) Berk Demir	(Turkey) Anadolu Efes	(Turkey) Darüşşafaka	2	
July 2	(France) Adrien Moerman	(Spain) Barcelona	(Turkey) Anadolu Efes	2	
July 10	(Greece) Ioannis Papapetrou	(Greece) Olympiacos	(Greece) Panathinaikos	3	
July 10	(Turkey) Scottie Wilbekin	(Turkey) Darüşşafaka	(Israel) Maccabi Tel Aviv	3	
July 12	(United States) James Anderson	(Russia) Khimki	(Turkey) Anadolu Efes	1+1	
July 12	(Bulgaria) Aleksandar Vezenkov	(Spain) Barcelona	(Greece) Olympiacos	2	
July 13	(United States) Mike James	(Greece) Panathinaikos	(Italy) AX Olimpia Milan	3	
July 17	(France) Axel Toupane	(Lithuania) Žalgiris	(Greece) Olympiacos	2	
July 17	(United States) Chris Singleton	(Greece) Panathinaikos	(Spain) Barcelona	1	
July 18	(Latvia) Jānis Timma	(Spain) Baskonia	(Greece) Olympiacos	2	
July 24	(Finland) Petteri Koponen	(Spain) Barcelona	(Germany) Bayern Munich	3	
July 25	(Canada) Kevin Pangos	(Lithuania) Žalgiris	(Spain) Barcelona	2	
July 25	(France) Kim Tillie	(Greece) Olympiacos	(Spain) Gran Canaria	1	
July 30	(United States) Deshaun Thomas	(Israel) Maccabi Tel Aviv	(Greece) Panathinaikos	1	
September 23	(France) Léo Westermann	(Russia) CSKA Moscow	(Lithuania) Žalgiris	1	
January 2	(Slovenia) Alen Omić	(Montenegro) Budućnost	(Italy) AX Olimpia Milan	1	

=== To a EuroLeague team ===
Date	Player	From	To	Contract years	Ref.
May 30	(United States) Coty Clarke	(Russia) Avtodor Saratov	(Montenegro) Budućnost	1	
June 12	(Turkey) Metecan Birsen	(Turkey) Sakarya	(Turkey) Anadolu Efes	2	
June 13	(Turkey) Sertac Sanli	(Turkey) Beşiktaş	(Turkey) Anadolu Efes	2	
June 16	(United States) Earl Clark	(Turkey) Beşiktaş	(Montenegro) Budućnost	1	
June 16	(Turkey) Bugrahan Tuncer	(Turkey) Eskişehir	(Turkey) Anadolu Efes	2	
June 18	(United States) Kendrick Ray	(Czech Republic) ČEZ Nymburk	(Israel) Maccabi Tel Aviv	3	
June 21	(United States) Thomas Walkup	(Germany) EWE Baskets Oldenburg	(Lithuania) Žalgiris	2	
June 22	(Lithuania) Laurynas Birutis	(Lithuania) Šiauliai	(Lithuania) Žalgiris		
June 22	(Italy) Amedeo Della Valle	(Italy) Pallacanestro Reggiana	(Italy) AX Olimpia Milan		
June 25	(United States) Jeff Brooks	(Spain) Unicaja	(Italy) AX Olimpia Milan	2	
June 25	(United States) Jordan Loyd	(Israel) Hapoel Eilat	(Turkey) Darüşşafaka	1	
June 25	(Latvia) Žanis Peiners	(Lithuania) Lietkabelis	(Turkey) Darüşşafaka	2	
June 26	(United States) Angelo Caloiaro	(Turkey) Banvit	(Israel) Maccabi Tel Aviv	1	
June 26	(United States) Aaron Craft	(France) Monaco	(Montenegro) Budućnost	1	
June 26	(Russia) Petr Gubanov	(Russia) Nizhy Novgorod	(Russia) Khimki	1	
June 27	(Gabon) Stéphane Lasme	(Russia) UNICS	(Greece) Panathinaikos	1	
June 27	(Serbia) Nemanja Nedović	(Spain) Unicaja	(Italy) AX Olimpia Milan		
June 28	(Italy) Christian Burns	(Italy) Cantù	(Italy) AX Olimpia Milan	1	
June 28	(Lithuania) Martinas Geben	(United States) Notre Dame	(Lithuania) Žalgiris		
July 3	(Lithuania) Marius Grigonis	(Germany) Alba Berlin	(Lithuania) Žalgiris	3	
July 4	(France) Joffrey Lauvergne	(United States) San Antonio Spurs	(Turkey) Fenerbahçe	2	
July 4	(Croatia) Leon Radošević	(Germany) Brose Bamberg	(Germany) Bayern Munich	3	
July 5	(United States) Nigel Williams-Goss	(Serbia) Partizan	(Greece) Olympiacos	3	
July 6	(Germany) Robin Amaize	(Germany) medi Bayreuth	(Germany) Bayern Munich	3	
July 6	(United States) Ray McCallum	(Spain) Unicaja	(Turkey) Darüşşafaka	1	
July 7	(United States) Zach LeDay	(Israel) Hapoel Gilboa Galil	(Greece) Olympiacos	2+1	
July 8	(United States) Nate Wolters	(France) Élan Chalon	(Lithuania) Žalgiris	1+1	
July 9	(Slovenia) Klemen Prepelič	(France) Levallois Metropolitans	(Spain) Real Madrid	2	
July 12	(Bulgaria) Dee Bost	(France) Strasbourg	(Russia) Khimki	1	
July 13	(United States) Cory Jefferson	(United States) Texas Legends	(Turkey) Darüşşafaka		
July 13	(Germany) Maodo Lo	(Germany) Brose Bamberg	(Germany) Bayern Munich	2	
July 14	(United States) Keith Langford	(Israel) Maccabi Rishon LeZion	(Greece) Panathinaikos	1	
July 16	(Israel) Nimrod Levi	(Israel) Maccabi Ashdod	(Israel) Maccabi Tel Aviv	2	
July 17	(France) Youssoupha Fall	(France) Le Mans	(Spain) Baskonia	4	
July 17	(Italy) Daniel Hackett	(Germany) Brose Bamberg	(Russia) CSKA Moscow	2	
July 18	(Slovakia) Kyle Kuric	(Russia) Zenit	(Spain) Barcelona	2	
July 18	(Denmark) Shavon Shields	(Italy) Trento	(Spain) Baskonia	2	
July 19	(Argentina) Gabriel Deck	(Argentina) San Lorenzo	(Spain) Real Madrid	3	
July 19	(Canada) Tyler Ennis	(United States) Los Angeles Lakers	(Turkey) Fenerbahçe	2	
July 19	(Senegal) Clevin Hannah	(Spain) UCAM Murcia	(Spain) Gran Canaria		
July 20	(Greece) Georgios Papagiannis	(United States) Portland Trail Blazers	(Greece) Panathinaikos	5	
July 23	(United States) Alec Peters	(United States) Phoenix Suns	(Russia) CSKA Moscow	1	
July 24	(United States) Casey Prather	(Greece) Promitheas Patras	(Russia) Khimki	1+1	
July 25	(Russia) Ivan Ukhov	(Russia) Parma	(Russia) CSKA Moscow	3	
July 26	(United States) Markel Brown	(United States) Houston Rockets	(Turkey) Darüşşafaka	1	
July 26	(United States) Shane Larkin	(United States) Boston Celtics	(Turkey) Anadolu Efes	1	
July 27	(United States) Jordan Mickey	(United States) Miami Heat	(Russia) Khimki	1	
July 30	(Ukraine) Artem Pustovyi	(Spain) Obradoiro	(Spain) Barcelona	3	
July 30	(Cameroon) D. J. Strawberry	(Turkey) Beşiktaş	(Spain) Gran Canaria	1	
July 31	(United States) Johnny O'Bryant	(United States) Charlotte Hornets	(Israel) Maccabi Tel Aviv	1	
July 31	(Greece) Vangelis Sakellariou	(Greece) Panionios	(Greece) Panathinaikos	1+1	
August 1	(Germany) Tibor Pleiss	(Spain) Valencia	(Turkey) Anadolu Efes	1+1	
August 2	(United States) Chris Evans	(France) Monaco	(Spain) Gran Canaria	1	
August 6	(Lithuania) Donatas Sabeckis	(Lithuania) Šiauliai	(Lithuania) Žalgiris	1+1	
August 8	(Ukraine) Joel Bolomboy	(United States) Milwaukee Bucks	(Russia) CSKA Moscow	3	
August 8	(United States) Tony Crocker	(Turkey) Tofaş	(Russia) Khimki	1	
August 9	(Slovenia) Jaka Blažič	(Spain) MoraBanc Andorra	(Spain) Barcelona	1	
August 13	(United States) Darrun Hilliard	(United States) San Antonio Spurs	(Spain) Baskonia	1	
August 16	(Montenegro) Igor Drobnjak	(Serbia) Mega Bemax	(Montenegro) Budućnost		
August 18	(United States) Jon Diebler	(Turkey) Beşiktaş	(Turkey) Darüşşafaka	1	
August 20	(United States) Tarik Black	(United States) Houston Rockets	(Israel) Maccabi Tel Aviv		
August 21	(United States) Jeremy Evans	(United States) Atlanta Hawks	(Turkey) Darüşşafaka	1	
September 2	(Bosnia and Herzegovina) Ajdin Penava	(United States) Marshall	(Spain) Baskonia	4	
September 18	(Serbia) Nemanja Dangubić	(Serbia) Crvena zvezda	(Germany) Bayern Munich	1	
September 25	(Slovenia) Alen Omić	(Serbia) Crvena zvezda	(Montenegro) Budućnost	1	
October 3	(United States) Derrick Williams	(United States) Los Angeles Lakers	(Germany) Bayern Munich	1	
October 18	(United States) Derrick Walton	(United States) Miami Heat	(Lithuania) Žalgiris	1	
October 26	(United States) Erick Green	(Spain) Valencia	(Turkey) Fenerbahçe	1	
November 4	(United States) Ramon Sessions	(United States) Washington Wizards	(Israel) Maccabi Tel Aviv	3 months	
November 9	(United States) Garlon Green	(Belgium) Belfius Mons-Hainaut	(Russia) Khimki	1	
November 16	(Serbia) Nikola Radičević	(Italy) Trento	(Spain) Gran Canaria	1	
December 5	(United States) Toney Douglas	(Turkey) Sakarya	(Turkey) Darüşşafaka	1	
December 13	(Estonia) Siim-Sander Vene	(Spain) Fuenlabrada	(Spain) Gran Canaria	1	
December 20	(Georgia (country)) Goga Bitadze	(Serbia) Mega Bemax	(Montenegro) Budućnost	1	
December 21	(United States) James Bell	(Croatia) Cedevita	(Montenegro) Budućnost	1	
December 21	(United States) Norris Cole	(Italy) Sidigas Avellino	(Montenegro) Budućnost	1	
December 24	(United States) Josh Magette	(Croatia) Cedevita	(Spain) Gran Canaria	1	
January 6	(United States) Deon Thompson	(Spain) San Pablo Burgos	(Lithuania) Žalgiris	1	
January 9	(United States) Sean Kilpatrick	(United States) Chicago Bulls	(Greece) Panathinaikos	1	
January 13	(United States) Adreian Payne	(China) Nanjing Monkey King	(Greece) Panathinaikos	1	
January 22	(United States) Jalen Jones	(United States) Cleveland Cavaliers	(Spain) Baskonia	1	
January 27	(United States) James Nunnally	(United States) Houston Rockets	(Italy) AX Olimpia Milan	1	
February 6	(United States) Briante Weber	(United States) Sioux Falls Skyforce	(Greece) Olympiacos	1	
February 14	(United States) Devin Williams	(Turkey) Büyükçekmece	(Montenegro) Budućnost	1	
February 20	(United States) Jacob Wiley	(Australia) Adelaide 36ers	(Spain) Gran Canaria	1	
February 22	(United States) Cory Jefferson	(China) Guangzhou Long-Lions	(Spain) Gran Canaria	1	
February 27	(United States) Aaron Harrison	(United States) New Orleans Pelicans	(Russia) Khimki	1	

=== Leaving a EuroLeague team ===
Date	Player	From	To	Ref.
June 26	(United States) Kenny Gabriel	(Greece) Panathinaikos	(Turkey) Türk Telekom	
June 26	(Israel) Itay Segev	(Israel) Maccabi Tel Aviv	(Israel) Maccabi Rishon LeZion	
June 28	(United States) Reggie Redding	(Germany) Bayern Munich	(Turkey) Türk Telekom	
July 2	(Italy) Marco Cusin	(Italy) AX Olimpia Milan	(Italy) Fiat Turin	
July 2	(United States) Brad Wanamaker	(Turkey) Fenerbahçe	(United States) Boston Celtics	
July 3	(Turkey) Berk Uğurlu	(Turkey) Fenerbahçe	(Turkey) Pınar Karşıyaka	
July 3	(Canada) Kyle Wiltjer	(Greece) Olympiacos	(Spain) Unicaja	
July 4	(United States) Jalen Reynolds	(Spain) Barcelona	(Russia) Zenit	
July 6	(United States) Will Cummings	(Turkey) Darüşşafaka	(Germany) EWE Baskets Oldenburg	
July 6	(United States) Pierre Jackson	(Israel) Maccabi Tel Aviv	(China) Beijing Fly Dragons	
July 9	(Slovenia) Luka Dončić	(Spain) Real Madrid	(United States) Dallas Mavericks	
July 11	(United States) JaJuan Johnson	(Turkey) Darüşşafaka	(Russia) Lokomotiv Kuban	
July 12	(United States) Andrew Goudelock	(Italy) AX Olimpia Milan	(China) Shandong Golden Stars	
July 12	(Serbia) Vladimir Štimac	(Turkey) Anadolu Efes	(Turkey) Türk Telekom	
July 13	(United States) Brian Roberts	(Greece) Olympiacos	(Spain) Unicaja	
July 16	(Latvia) Rodions Kurucs	(Spain) Barcelona	(United States) Brooklyn Nets	
July 17	(United States) Jamel McLean	(Greece) Olympiacos	(Russia) Lokomotiv Kuban	
July 17	(Germany) Maik Zirbes	(Germany) Bayern Munich	(Serbia) Crvena zvezda	
July 19	(Italy) Awudu Abass	(Italy) AX Olimpia Milan	(Italy) Brescia	
July 19	(Kosovo) Justin Doellman	(Montenegro) Budućnost	(Spain) Manresa	
July 20	(Spain) Marc García	(Spain) Barcelona	(Spain) Fuenlabrada	
July 21	(France) Amath M'Baye	(Italy) AX Olimpia Milan	(Italy) Virtus Bologna	
July 23	(Lithuania) Gytis Masiulis	(Lithuania) Žalgiris	(Lithuania) Neptūnas	
July 23	(Turkey) Muhaymin Mustafa	(Turkey) Anadolu Efes	(Turkey) Tofaş	
July 24	(Lithuania) Mantas Kalnietis	(Italy) AX Olimpia Milan	(France) ASVEL	
July 24	(Italy) Davide Pascolo	(Italy) AX Olimpia Milan	(Italy) Trento	
July 25	(Australia) Jonah Bolden	(Israel) Maccabi Tel Aviv	(United States) Philadelphia 76ers	
July 25	(Russia) Vitaly Fridzon	(Russia) CSKA Moscow	(Russia) Lokomotiv Kuban	
July 25	(Germany) Karim Jallow	(Germany) Bayern Munich	(Germany) MHP Riesen Ludwigsburg	
July 26	(Argentina) Nicolás Brussino	(Spain) Gran Canaria	(Spain) Iberostar Tenerife	
July 31	(United States) James Bell	(Turkey) Darüşşafaka	(Croatia) Cedevita	
August 1	(Spain) Pablo Aguilar	(Spain) Gran Canaria	(Croatia) Cedevita	
August 1	(United States) Marcus Denmon	(Greece) Panathinaikos	(China) Zhejiang Golden Bulls	
August 1	(Bosnia and Herzegovina) Amar Gegić	(Germany) Bayern Munich	(Serbia) Partizan	
August 3	(Cuba) Howard Sant-Roos	(Turkey) Darüşşafaka	(Greece) AEK Athens	
August 6	(United States) Toney Douglas	(Turkey) Anadolu Efes	(Turkey) Sakarya	
August 6	(Lithuania) Paulius Valinskas	(Lithuania) Žalgiris	(Lithuania) Šiauliai	
August 7	(Greece) Zach Auguste	(Greece) Panathinaikos	(Turkey) Galatasaray	
August 8	(United States) James Nunnally	(Turkey) Fenerbahçe	(United States) Minnesota Timberwolves	
August 8	(Serbia) Nikola Radičević	(Spain) Gran Canaria	(Italy) Trento	
August 8	(Montenegro) Dino Radončić	(Spain) Real Madrid	(Spain) San Pablo Burgos	
August 11	(United States) Jason Thompson	(Turkey) Fenerbahçe	(China) Sichuan Blue Whales	
August 13	(United States) D. J. Seeley	(Spain) Gran Canaria	(Lithuania) Lietuvos rytas	
August 14	(Israel) Karam Mashour	(Israel) Maccabi Tel Aviv	(Israel) Bnei Herzliya	
August 17	(United States) Norris Cole	(Israel) Maccabi Tel Aviv	(Italy) Sidigas Avellino	
August 28	(United States) Kyle Gibson	(Montenegro) Budućnost	(Turkey) Beşiktaş	
August 30	(United States) Thomas Robinson	(Russia) Khimki	(United States) Atlanta Hawks	
September 10	(United States) Phil Pressey	(Spain) Barcelona	(Turkey) Beşiktaş	
September 17	(United States) Victor Rudd	(Russia) CSKA Moscow	(Italy) Fiat Turin	
September 21	(United States) Errick McCollum	(Turkey) Anadolu Efes	(Russia) UNICS	
October 9	(Israel) Gal Mekel	(Spain) Gran Canaria	(Russia) Zenit	
October 31	(Lithuania) Donatas Sabeckis	(Lithuania) Žalgiris	(Germany) MHP Riesen Ludwigsburg	
November 25	(United States) Aaron Craft	(Montenegro) Budućnost	(Italy) Trento	
December 7	(Guinea-Bissau) K.C. Rivers	(Greece) Panathinaikos	(Italy) Reggio Emilia	
December 19	(Belarus) Artsiom Parakhouski	(Israel) Maccabi Tel Aviv	(Lithuania) Rytas	
December 30	(Montenegro) Zoran Nikolić	(Montenegro) Budućnost	(Serbia) Mega Bemax	
January 8	(United States) Chris Evans	(Spain) Gran Canaria	(Turkey) Pınar Karşıyaka	
February 13	(United States) Derrick Walton	(Lithuania) Žalgiris	(Germany) Alba Berlin	
February 26	(United States) Kendrick Ray	(Israel) Maccabi Tel Aviv	(France) Le Mans	
February 28	(Bulgaria) Dee Bost	(Russia) Khimki	(France) Monaco	
March 2	(Latvia) Dairis Bertāns	(Italy) AX Olimpia Milan	(United States) New Orleans Pelicans	
