= 2019 BSL All-Star Game =

Turkish basketball game

Team Asia	Team Europe
147	146
	1	2	3	4	Total
Team Asia	39	41	36	31	147
Team Europe	41	41	29	35	146
- Date: January 20, 2019
- Venue: Sinan Erdem Dome, Istanbul
- MVP: Kenny Gabriel (Team Asia)
- Referees: Ayşenur Yazıcıoğlu, Özge Şentürk, Sinem Tetik
- Halftime show: Edis
- Network: tivibu Spor

BSL All-Star Game

The 2019 BSL All-Star Game, officially called the 2019 Tahincioğlu All-Star Game for sponsorship reasons, was held on January 20, 2019, at the Sinan Erdem Dome, Istanbul.

== All-Star Game ==
=== Coaches ===
Ergin Ataman of Anadolu Efes was named as the head coach for the Team Europe and Burak Gören of Türk Telekom was named as the head coach for the Team Asia.

=== Rosters ===
Two teams, Team Europe and Team Asia, competed in the event. Team Europe consisted of players from the teams based in the European side, and Team Asia consisted of players from the teams based in the Asian side of Turkey.

The startes for the All-Star Game were selected through a voting process. The reserves were selected by the head coaches.

Team Europe
Pos.	Player	Team
Starters
G	(Turkey) Kartal Özmızrak	Darüşşafaka
G	(Turkey) Doğuş Balbay	Anadolu Efes
F	(Turkey) Emir Preldžić	Bahçeşehir Koleji
F	(France) Adrien Moerman	Anadolu Efes
C	(Turkey) Semih Erden	İstanbul BB
Reserves
G	(France) Rodrigue Beaubois	Anadolu Efes
F	(United States) Devin Williams	Büyükçekmece
G	(Spain) Quino Colom	Bahçeşehir Koleji
G	(United States) Jason Rich	Beşiktaş
F	(Germany) Robin Benzing	Beşiktaş
F	(United States) Aaron Harrison	Galatasaray
G	(Turkey) Göksenin Köksal	Galatasaray
Head coach: Ergin Ataman (Anadolu Efes)

Team Asia
Pos.	Player	Team
Starters
G	(Turkey) Bobby Dixon	Fenerbahçe
G	(Turkey) Şehmus Hazer	Banvit
F	(Turkey) Alp Karahan	Sakarya BB
F	(United States) Kenny Gabriel	Türk Telekom
C	(Egypt) Assem Marei	Pınar Karşıyaka
Reserves
F	(Turkey) Cevher Özer	Afyon Belediye
C	(France) Joffrey Lauvergne	Fenerbahçe
F	(Serbia) Marko Gudurić	Fenerbahçe
F	(United States) Shaq McKissic	Gaziantep
G	(Turkey) Berk Uğurlu	Pınar Karşıyaka
F	(Turkey) Berkan Durmaz	Tofaş
F	(Austria) Sylven Landesberg	Türk Telekom
Head coach: Burak Gören (Türk Telekom)

=== Game ===
tivibu Spor

January 20
14:00 TRT

Report

Team Europe 146, Team Asia 147
Scoring by quarter: 41–39, 41–41, 29–36, 35–31
Pts: Moerman 24	Pts: Gabriel 44

Sinan Erdem Dome, Istanbul
Referees: Emin Moğulkoç, Ahmet Tatlıcı, Can Mavisu

== All-Star Organizations ==
=== Celebrity Game ===
The Celebrity Game was a 3x3 basketball game, with one backboard and in a half-court setup.

tivibu Spor

January 20

Report

Red Team 10, Blue Team 10

Sinan Erdem Dome, Istanbul
Referees: Mustafa Özben

Red Team
Player	Background
Sarp Levendoğlu	Actor
Sedef Avcı	Actress
Can Yaman	Actor

Blue Team
Player	Background
Büşra Pekin	Actress
Kıvanç Kasabalı	Actor
Alina Boz	Actress
Derya Şensoy	Actress

=== Skills Challenge ===
The Skills Challenge was presented by LeasePlan.

Contestants
Pos.	Player	Team	Height	Weight	First round	Final round
G	Doğuş Özdemiroğlu	Darüşşafaka	1.91 m (6 ft 3 in)	88 kg (194 lb)	0:27	0:26
G	Berke Aygündüz	Pınar Karşıyaka	1.96 m (6 ft 5 in)		0:27	0:30
G	Emir Gökalp	Galatasaray	1.85 m (6 ft 1 in)	79 kg (174 lb)	0:28	DNQ
G	Şehmus Hazer	Banvit	1.91 m (6 ft 3 in)	90 kg (200 lb)	0:38	DNQ
G	Yunus Emre Sonsırma	Türk Telekom	1.96 m (6 ft 5 in)	86 kg (190 lb)	0:42	DNQ

=== Three-Point Contest ===
The Three-Point Contest was presented by ING Bank.

Contestants
Pos.	Player	Team	Height	Weight	First round	Final round
F	Marko Gudurić	Fenerbahçe	1.98 m (6 ft 6 in)	91 kg (201 lb)	21	20
G	Andy Rautins	Bahçeşehir Koleji	1.93 m (6 ft 4 in)	86 kg (190 lb)	22	16
G	Yiğit Arslan	Tofaş	1.93 m (6 ft 4 in)	91 kg (201 lb)	18	DNQ
G	Can Maxim Mutaf	Beşiktaş	1.93 m (6 ft 4 in)	95 kg (209 lb)	16	DNQ
G	Rodrigue Beaubois	Anadolu Efes	1.88 m (6 ft 2 in)	84 kg (185 lb)	14	DNQ
F	Aaron Harrison	Galatasaray	1.98 m (6 ft 6 in)	90 kg (200 lb)	14	DNQ
F	Sylven Landesberg	Türk Telekom	1.98 m (6 ft 6 in)	95 kg (209 lb)	12	DNQ

=== Slam Dunk Contest ===
The Slam Dunk Contest was presented by Tahincioğlu. The judges were David Rivers, Efe Aydan, Melissa Tahincioğlu, Alain Digbeu and Tamer Oyguç.

Contestants
Pos.	Player	Team	Height	Weight	First round	Final round
F	Kenny Gabriel	Türk Telekom	2.06 m (6 ft 9 in)	99 kg (218 lb)	99 (49+50)	99 (49+50)
F	Zach Auguste^{REP1}	Galatasaray	2.08 m (6 ft 10 in)	108 kg (238 lb)	100 (50+50)	49 (49+0)
F	Shaq McKissic	Gaziantep	1.96 m (6 ft 5 in)	96 kg (212 lb)	95 (45+50)	DNQ
F	Chris Evans	Pınar Karşıyaka	2.03 m (6 ft 8 in)	100 kg (220 lb)	86 (43+50)	DNQ
F	Onuralp Bitim^{INJ1}	Anadolu Efes	1.98 m (6 ft 6 in)	93 kg (205 lb)	DNP	

^INJ1 Onuralp Bitim was unable to play due to disease.
^REP1 Zach Auguste was selected as Onuralp Bitim's replacement.
