= 2018 BSL All-Star Game =

Turkish basketball game

Team Asia	Team Europe
	1	2	3	4	Total
Team Asia	32	38	48	33	151
Team Europe	37	33	38	34	142
- Date: January 21, 2018
- Venue: Sinan Erdem Dome, Istanbul
- MVP: Barış Ermiş (Team Asia)
- Referees: Emin Moğulkoç, Ahmet Tatlıcı, Can Mavisu
- Halftime show: Murat Boz
- Network: NTV Spor

BSL All-Star Game

The 2018 BSL All-Star Game, officially called the 2018 Tahincioğlu All-Star Game for sponsorship reasons, was held on January 21, 2018, at the Sinan Erdem Dome, Istanbul.

== All-Star Game ==
=== Coaches ===
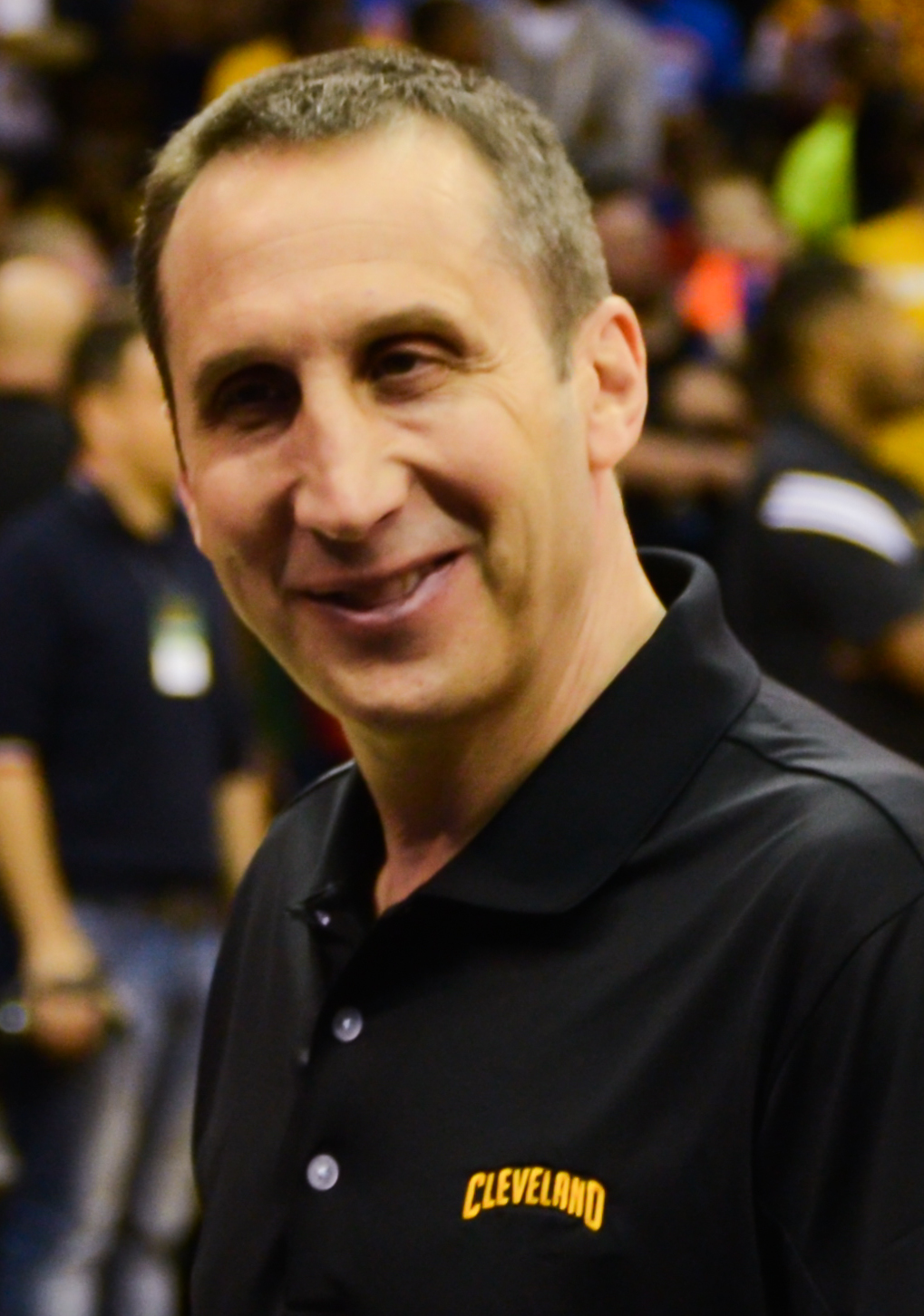
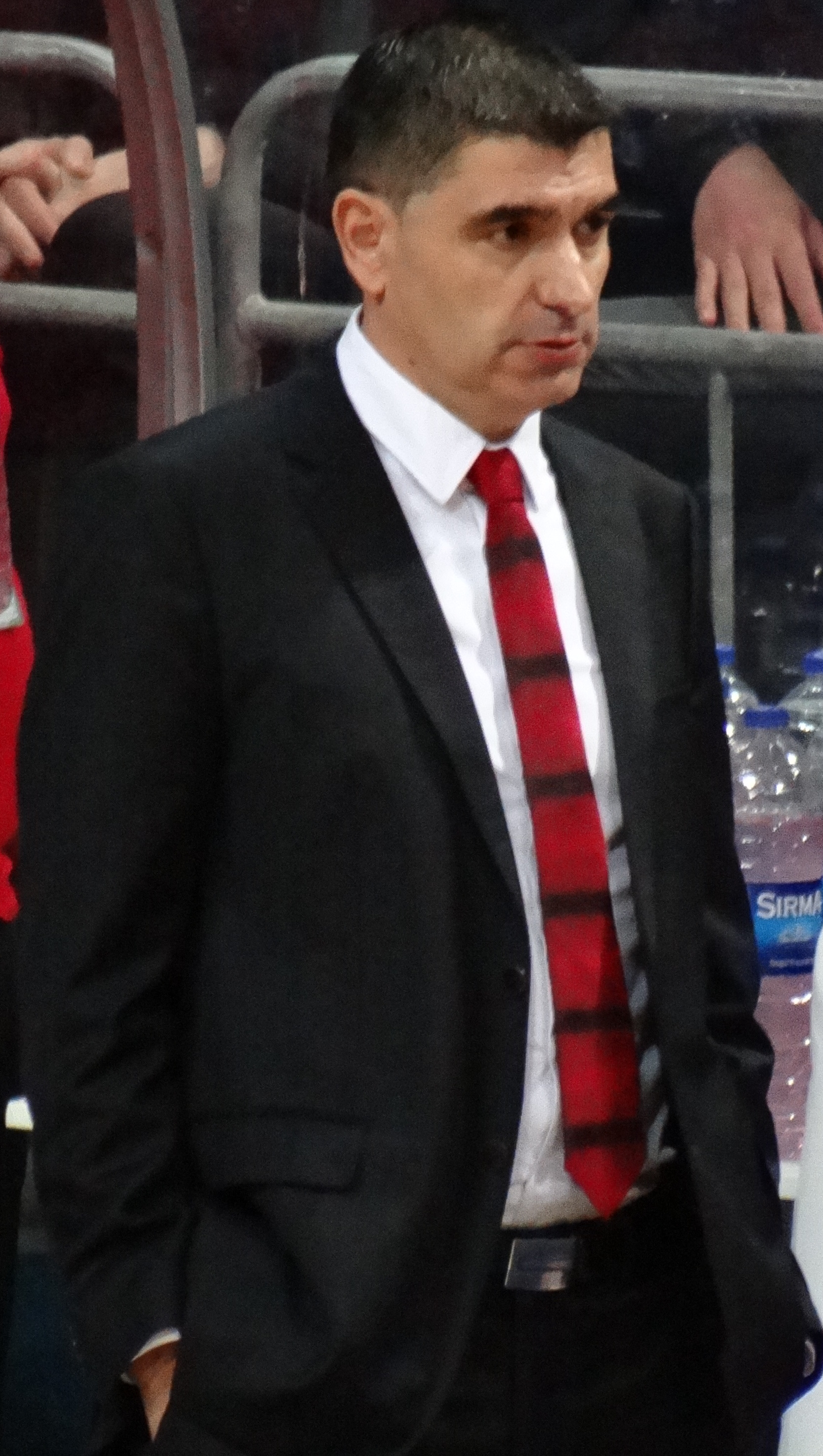
Darüşşafaka's David Blatt (left) and Eskişehir Basket's Josep Maria Berrocal (right) were selected as the All-Star Game head coaches.

David Blatt of Darüşşafaka was named as the head coach for the Team Europe and Josep Maria Berrocal of Eskişehir Basket was named as the head coach for the Team Asia.

=== Rosters ===
Two teams, Team Europe and Team Asia, competed in the event. Team Europe consisted of players from the teams based in the European side, and Team Asia consisted of players from the teams based in the Asian side of Turkey.

The startes for the All-Star Game were selected through a voting process. The reserves were selected by the head coaches and votes.

Team Europe
Pos.	Player	Team
Starters
G	(United States) Errick McCollum	Anadolu Efes
G	(United States) Scottie Wilbekin	Darüşşafaka
F	(United States) D. J. Strawberry	Beşiktaş Sompo Japan
F	(United States) Derrick Brown	Anadolu Efes
C	(Turkey) Sertaç Şanlı	Beşiktaş Sompo Japan
Reserves
G	(Turkey) Kartal Özmızrak	Darüşşafaka
G	(Turkey) Kenan Sipahi	Beşiktaş Sompo Japan
G	(United States) Erving Walker	Demir İnşaat Büyükçekmece
G	(Turkey) Göksenin Köksal	Galatasaray Odeabank
F	(Croatia) Ivan Buva	İstanbul BB
F	(United States) JaJuan Johnson	Darüşşafaka
C	(Turkey) Ege Arar	Galatasaray Odeabank
Head coach: David Blatt (Darüşşafaka)

Team Asia
Pos.	Player	Team
Starters
G	(Turkey) Barış Ermiş	Tofaş
G	(United States) Brad Wanamaker	Fenerbahçe Doğuş
F	(Italy) Luigi Datome	Fenerbahçe Doğuş
F	(Dominican Republic) Sammy Mejía	Tofaş
C	(Slovenia) Gašper Vidmar	Banvit
Reserves
G	(Turkey) Melih Mahmutoğlu	Fenerbahçe Doğuş
G	(Turkey) Buğrahan Tuncer	Eskişehir Basket
F	(Turkey) Tolga Geçim	Banvit
F	(Turkey) Metecan Birsen	Sakarya BB
F	(United States) Jeff Ayres	Eskişehir Basket
C	(Nigeria) Chris Obekpa	Trabzonspor
C	(France) Moustapha Fall	Sakarya BB
Head coach: Josep Maria Berrocal (Eskişehir Basket)

=== Game ===
NTV Spor

January 21
14:00 TRT

Report

Team Europe 142, Team Asia 151
Scoring by quarter: 37–32, 33–38, 38–48, 34–33
Pts: Walker 30	Pts: Ayres 26

Sinan Erdem Dome, Istanbul
Referees: Emin Moğulkoç, Ahmet Tatlıcı, Can Mavisu

=== Skills Challenge ===
The Skills Challenge was presented by LeasePlan.

Contestants
Pos.	Player	Team	Height	Weight	First round	Final round
G	Yiğit Arslan	Tofaş	1.93 m (6 ft 4 in)	91 kg (201 lb)	0:30/0:24	0:31
G	Erkin Şenel	Banvit	1.90 m (6 ft 3 in)	90 kg (200 lb)	0:28	0:41
C	Emircan Koşut	Darüşşafaka	2.16 m (7 ft 1 in)	10 kg (22 lb)	0:30/0:34	DNQ
C	Moustapha Fall	Sakarya BB	2.18 m (7 ft 2 in)	124 kg (273 lb)	0:33	DNQ
G	Can Uğur Öğüt	Gaziantep	1.78 m (5 ft 10 in)	73 kg (161 lb)	0:42	DNQ
C	Ege Arar	Galatasaray Odeabank	2.08 m (6 ft 10 in)	104 kg (229 lb)	0:42	DNQ

=== Three-Point Contest ===
The Three-Point Contest was presented by ING Bank.

Contestants
Pos.	Player	Team	Height	Weight	First round	Final round
G	Brady Heslip	Trabzonspor	1.80 m (5 ft 11 in)	82 kg (181 lb)	23	22
G	Scott Wood	Pınar Karşıyaka	1.90 m (6 ft 3 in)	86 kg (190 lb)	20/22	9
G	Melih Mahmutoğlu	Fenerbahçe	1.91 m (6 ft 3 in)	85 kg (187 lb)	20/19	DNQ
G	Ryan Toolson	İstanbul BB	1.93 m (6 ft 4 in)	90 kg (200 lb)	16	DNQ
C	Sertaç Şanlı	Beşiktaş Sompo Japan	2.13 m (7 ft 0 in)	115 kg (254 lb)	16	DNQ
G	Billy Baron	Eskişehir Basket	1.88 m (6 ft 2 in)	88 kg (194 lb)	13	DNQ

=== Slam Dunk Contest ===
The Slam Dunk Contest was presented by Tahincioğlu. The judges were İsmet Badem, Özcan Tahincioğlu, Ömer Onan, Murat Boz and Soner Sarıkabadayı.

Contestants
Pos.	Player	Team	Height	Weight	First round	Final round
F	Onuralp Bitim	Anadolu Efes	1.98 m (6 ft 6 in)	98 kg (216 lb)	97	100
G	Josh Adams	Beşiktaş Sompo Japan	1.88 m (6 ft 2 in)	86 kg (190 lb)	89	73
F	Richard Solomon	Muratbey Uşak	2.08 m (6 ft 10 in)	108 kg (238 lb)	89	DNQ
C	Christopher Obekpa	Trabzonspor	2.06 m (6 ft 9 in)	104 kg (229 lb)	81	DNQ
F	Erkan Yılmaz	Yeşilgiresun Belediye	1.96 m (6 ft 5 in)	87 kg (192 lb)	81	DNQ
F	Adonis Thomas	Banvit	1.98 m (6 ft 6 in)	105 kg (231 lb)	74	DNQ
