= Ünver =

Ünver is a given name and a surname of Turkish origin. Notable people with the name include:

== Given name ==
- Ünver Beşergil (born 1938), Turkish wrestler

== Surname ==
- Akın Ünver (born 1982), Turkish professor
- Emre Ünver (born 1981), Dutch politician
- İzzet Ünver (born 1992), Turkish volleyball player
- Ömer Ünver (born 1981), Turkish basketball player
