= Turkish Basketball Super League All-Star Game =

Turkish All-Star Game
- Status: Inactive
- Frequency: Annually
- Inaugurated: 2003-04
- Most recent: 2019-20
- Organizer: TBL; BSL

The Turkish Basketball Super League All-Star Game is an annual basketball event in that takes place in Turkey. It is organised by the Basketball Super League (BSL), which was formerly known as the Turkish Basketball League (TBL). The All-Star Game event includes a match between a selection of domestic all-stars versus foreign all-stars of the BSL, as well as slam dunk and a three-point contests. In its first three editions (2004, 2005, 2006), it was known as the TBL All-Star Game. From 2007 until 2014, it was known as the Beko All-Star Game, and since 2014, it has been known as the BSL All-Star Game. The all-star rosters are chosen by an online voting process. The all-star event was first held during the 2003–04 season.

The 2020 event was the 17th edition of the Turkish All-Star Game and it has not held ever since following the COVID-19 pandemic.

== List of games ==
Bold: Team that won the game.

Season	Date	Team	Score	Team	MVP
2003–04		Turkish All Stars	n/a	Foreign All Stars	
2004–05		Turkish All Stars	114–**123**	**Foreign All Stars**	(United States) Khalid El-Amin
2005–06		Turkish All Stars	(defeated by)	**Foreign All Stars**	(United States) Jeff Trepagnier
2006–07		Turkish All Stars	109–**114**	**Foreign All Stars**	(United States) Marcus Slaughter
2007–08	22 March 2008	Turkish All Stars	102–**106**	**Foreign All Stars**	(United States) Quinton Hosley
2008–09	18 January 2009	Turkish All Stars	122–**130**	**Foreign All Stars**	(United States) Robert Traylor
2009–10	11 January 2010	**Turkish All Stars**	**124**–115	Foreign All Stars	(Turkey) Kaya Peker
2010–11	7 February 2011	**Turkish All Stars**	**128**–127	Foreign All Stars	(Turkey) Birkan Batuk
2011–12	22 January 2012	Turkish All Stars	139–**140**	**Foreign All Stars**	(Slovenia) Sasha Vujačić
2012–13	20 January 2013	Turkish All Stars	115–**116**	**Foreign All Stars**	(United States) Joey Dorsey
2013–14	19 January 2010	**Turkish All Stars**	**122**–111	Foreign All Stars	(Turkey) Semih Erden
2014–15	18 January 2015	**Europe**	**138**–130	Asia	(Puerto Rico) Carlos Arroyo
2015–16	24 January 2016	Europe	136–**156**	**Asia**	(United States) Kenny Gabriel
2016–17	15 January 2017	Europe	135–**140**	**Asia**	(United States) Julian Wright
2017–18	21 January 2018	Europe	142–**151**	**Asia**	(Turkey) Barış Ermiş
2018–19	20 January 2019	Europe	146–**147**	**Asia**	(United States) Kenny Gabriel (2)
2019–20	20 January 2020	**Red Team**	**144**–126	White Team	(United States) Archie Goodwin

== Three-Point Shoot Contest ==
Year	Winner	Team
2004–05	(Turkey) Tutku Açık	Ülkerspor
2005–06	(Turkey) Harun Erdenay	Mersin BB
2006–07	(United States) Kenton Paulino	Beykoz Basketbol Takımı
2007–08	(Turkey) Omer Unver	TED Ankara Kolejliler
2008–09	(Turkey) Omer Unver (2)	Beşiktaş
2009–10	(Turkey) Engin Atsur	Beşiktaş
2010–11	(Turkey) Ömer Onan	Fenerbahçe Ülker
2011–12	(United States) Jonathan Gibson	Trabzonspor
2012–13	(New Zealand) Kirk Penney	TED Ankara Kolejliler
2013–14	(New Zealand) Kirk Penney (2)	Trabzonspor
2014–15	(United States) Michael Jenkins	İstanbul BB
2015–16	(Turkey) Melih Mahmutoglu	Fenerbahçe
2016–17	(Turkey) Melih Mahmutoglu	Fenerbahçe
2017–18	(Canada) Brady Heslip	Trabzonspor
2018–19	(Serbia) Marko Guduric	Fenerbahçe
2019–20	(Turkey) Melih Mahmutoglu (3)	Fenerbahçe

== Slam-Dunk Contest ==
Year	Winner	Team
2004–05	(Turkey) Cehver Ozer	Darüşşafaka
2005–06	(United States) Marcus Haislip	Ülkerspor
2006–07	(Turkey) Ersan Özseven	Mersin BB
2007–08	(United States) James White	Fenerbahçe Ülker
2008–09	(United States) Jason Forte	Banvit
2009–10	(Turkey) Sinan Guler	Efes Pilsen
2010–11	(United States) Tyler Smith	Bornova Belediyespor
2011–12	(United Kingdom) Pops Mensah Bonsu	Beşiktaş
2012–13	(Turkey) İzzet Türkyılmaz	Banvit
2013–14	(United States) Terrico White	Gaziantep Basketbol
2014–15	(United States) Kenny Gabriel	Pınar Karşıyaka
2015–16	(Turkey) Furkan Korkmaz	Anadolu Efes
2016–17	(United States) Tyler Honeycutt	Anadolu Efes
2017–18	(Turkey) Onuralp Bitim	Anadolu Efes
2018–19	(United States) Kenny Gabriel (2)	Türk Telekom
2019–20	(Turkey) Onuralp Bitim (2)	Pınar Karşıyaka

== Players with most appearances ==
Player	All-Star	Editions	Notes
(Turkey) Semih Erden	7	2010, 2013, 2014, 2015, 2016, 2017, 2019	1× MVP (2014)
(Turkey) Haluk Yıldırım	6	2005, 2006, 2007, 2008, 2009, 2011	
(Turkey) Ender Arslan	6	2005, 2006, 2008, 2009, 2013, 2014	
(Turkey) Kerem Gönlüm	5	2005, 2007, 2008, 2009, 2011	
(Turkey) Kaya Peker	5	2005, 2006, 2008, 2010, 2012	
(Bosnia and Herzegovina) (Turkey) Emir Preldžič	5	2011, 2012, 2013, 2015, 2019	
(Turkey) Barış Ermiş	5	2010, 2011, 2013, 2017, 2018	1× MVP (2018)
(Turkey) Kerem Tunçeri	5	2005, 2006, 2010, 2011, 2014	
(United States) (Turkey) Bobby Dixon	4	2013, 2015, 2016, 2019	
(United States) Lance Williams	3	2009, 2010, 2011	
(Puerto Rico) Carlos Arroyo	3	2012, 2014, 2015	
(Turkey) Tutku Açık	3	2007, 2008, 2009	1× Three-Point Winner (2005)
(United States) Willie Solomon	3	2005, 2007, 2008	

== Distinctions ==
=== FIBA Hall of Fame ===
- (New Zealand) Kirk Penney

=== EuroLeague Hall of Fame ===
- (Croatia) Nikola Vujčić
- (Bosnia and Herzegovina) (Turkey) Mirsad Türkcan
