= C. J. Harris (basketball) =

American basketball player

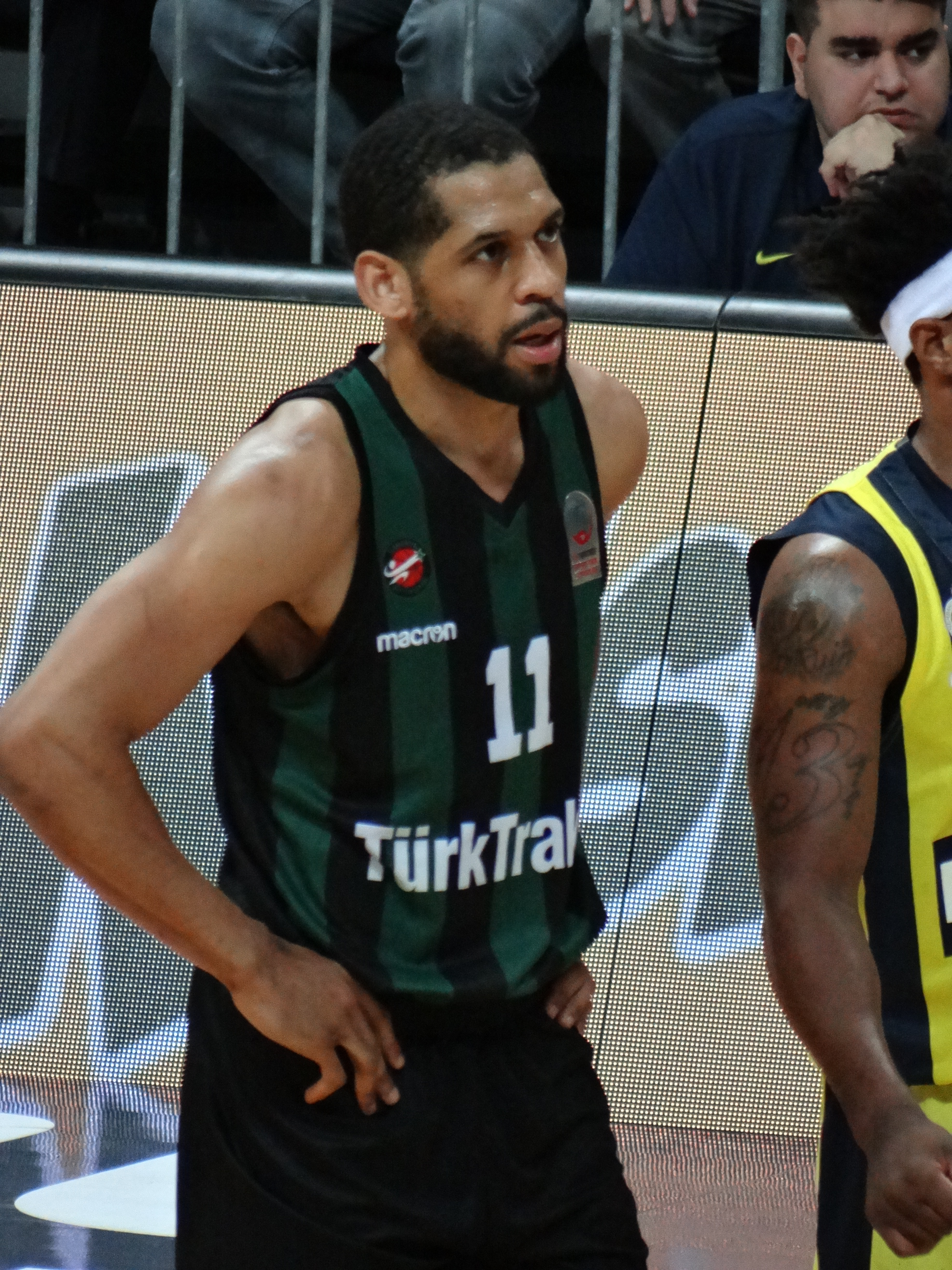
- Dorsey with Sakarya BB in 2018

No. 22 – Kolossos Rodou
- Position: Shooting guard / point guard
- League: GBL

Personal information
- Born: February 19, 1991 (age 35) Winston-Salem, North Carolina, U.S.
- Listed height: 6 ft 3 in (1.91 m)
- Listed weight: 190 lb (86 kg)

Career information
- High school: Mount Tabor (Winston-Salem, North Carolina)
- College: Wake Forest (2009–2013)
- NBA draft: 2013: undrafted
- Playing career: 2013–present

Career history
- 2013–2014: MHP Riesen Ludwigsburg
- 2014–2015: ratiopharm Ulm
- 2015: VEF Rīga
- 2015–2016: Rosa Radom
- 2016–2018: Sakarya BB
- 2018–2019: Élan Béarnais
- 2020: Türk Telekom
- 2020–2021: Hapoel Holon
- 2021–2022: JL Bourg
- 2022–2024: Hapoel Holon
- 2024–2026: Peristeri
- 2026–present: Kolossos Rodou

Career highlights
- Balkan Basketball League champion (2021); All-Champions League First Team (2021); Latvian League champion (2015); Polish Cup winner (2016); Polish Cup MVP (2016); Third-team All-ACC (2012)
- Stats at Basketball Reference

Calvin Dorsey Harris Jr. (born February 19, 1991) is an American professional basketball player for Kolossos Rodou of the Greek Basketball League (GBL). Standing at 1.91 m (6 ft 3 in), he plays at the point guard and shooting guard positions.

== Playing career ==
C.J. Harris played four seasons of college basketball at the Wake Forest University. He went undrafted in 2013 NBA draft, but later played for Denver Nuggets in the 2013 NBA Summer League.

In July 2013, Harris signed his first professional contract with the German team MHP Riesen Ludwigsburg for the 2013–14 season.

On July 10, 2014, he moved to another German Bundesliga club ratiopharm Ulm. On March 3, 2015, he signed with Latvian powerhouse VEF Rīga.

For the 2015–16 season, Harris signed with Rosa Radom in Poland. With Rosa, he won the Polish Basketball Cup, and Harris was named the Cup MVP.

On January 21, 2020, he has signed with Türk Telekom of the Turkish Super League. He averaged 5.3 points and 2.5 assists per game. On August 6, he signed with Hapoel Holon of the Israeli Basketball Premier League.

On July 19, 2021, he signed with JL Bourg of the French LNB Pro A. JL Bourg also plays in the EuroCup.

On June 19, 2022, he signed Hapoel Holon of the Israeli Basketball Premier League and returned for a second stint.

On July 27, Harris joined Kolossos Rodou of the Greek Basketball League.

== The Basketball Tournament ==
C.J. Harris played for Team Wake The Nation in the 2018 edition of The Basketball Tournament. He had nine points, two rebounds and a steal in the team's first-round loss to Team Showtime.
