= Sakarya Sports Hall =

Multi-purpose sports venue in Serdivan, Adapazarı, Turkey

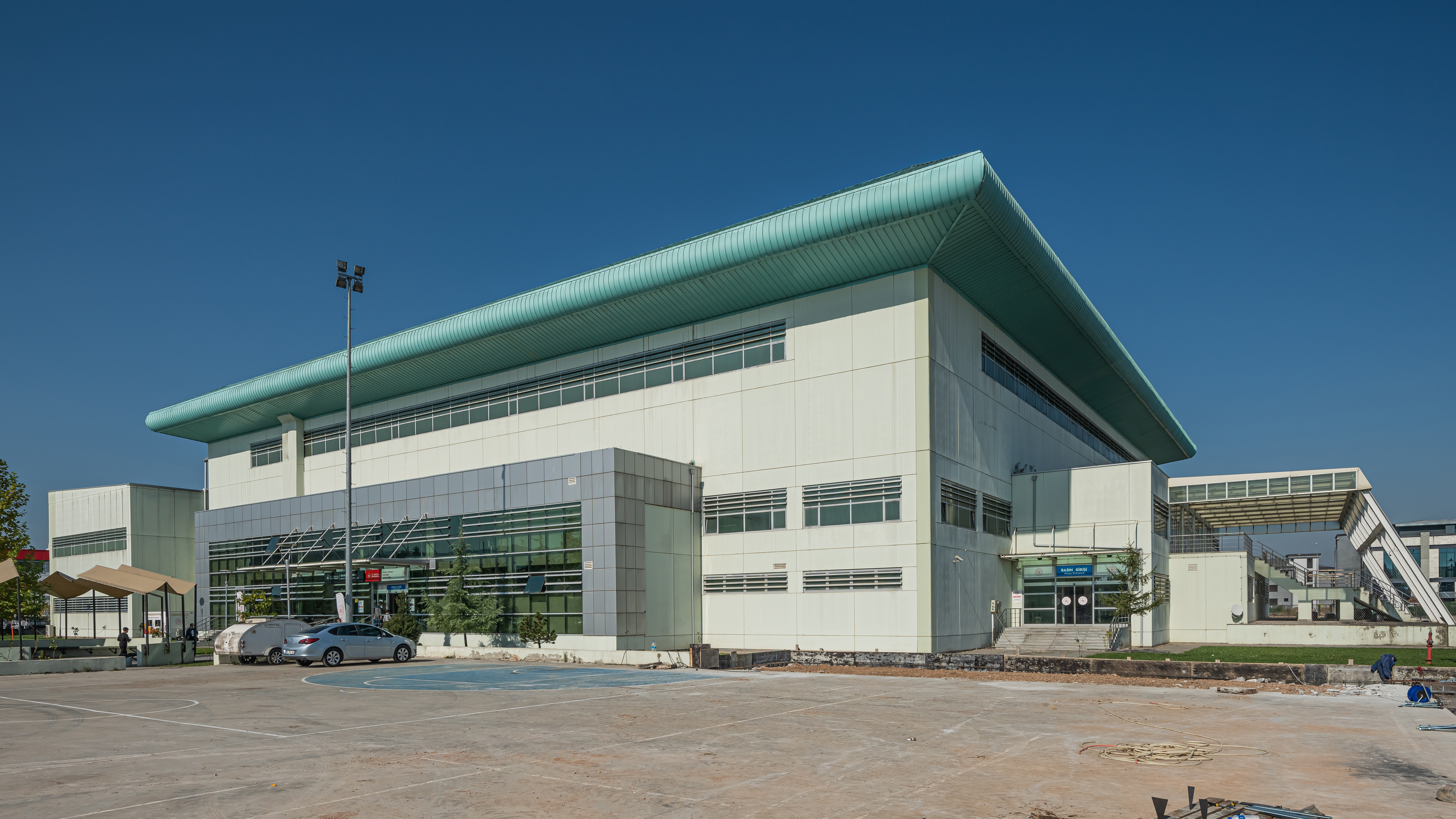
- Interactive map of Sakarya Sports Hall
- Full name: Sakarya Spor Salonu
- Location: Yazlık Mah. Serdivan, Adapazarı, Turkey
- Coordinates: 40°47′13″N 30°22′06″E
- Owner: Youth and Sports Directorate of Sakarya Province
- Capacity: 5,000
- Acreage: 21,000 m^{2} (5.2 acres)

Construction
- Groundbreaking: 25 May 2011
- Opened: 24 June 2013; 13 years ago
- Cost: ₺ 30 million (approx. US$18.75 million in May 2011)

Tenant
- Sakarya BB (2017–present)

Sakarya Sports Hall (Turkish: Sakarya Spor Salonu) is a multi-purpose indoor arena located at Yazlık neighborhood of Serdivan district in Adapazarı, Sakarya Province, Turkey.

The venue is used for competitions and trainings of a wide variety of sports branches including basketball, volleyball, handball, fencing, table tennis, wrestling, judo, karate, kick boxing and taekwondo. The sports hall was built in a land covering 21,000 m^{2} (5.2 acres), which was granted to the Youth and Sports Directorate of Sakarya Province by the Serdivan municipality on 1 September 2010. The construction, which was projected to cost ₺ 30 million (approx. US$18.75 million in May 2011), began with a ground breaking ceremony held on 25 May 2011. Opened officially on 24 June 2013, the facility has a seating capacity of 5,000.

== Events hosted ==
- 3rd International Sakarya Karate Open, 2013,
- 2015 Boys' Youth European Volleyball Championship.
