= 2010 FIBA World Championship knockout stage =

The knockout stage of the 2010 FIBA World Championship commenced play on 4 September 2010. The teams that finished fourth or higher at their respective preliminary round groups qualify for the knockout stage; the knockout stage is a modified single-elimination tournament, with a third–place game for the losers of the semifinals. The teams played all of their games at Sinan Erdem Dome, Istanbul, Turkey.

Eliminated teams at the quarterfinals played for fifth to eighth places, the loser of the first round play for seventh place, while the winners play for fifth place.

In order to give each contest more ticket sales, more TV coverage and more media coverage, the Local Organizing Committee proposed the measure to FIBA to extend the eighth-finals (round of 16)'s schedule to last four days instead of the previously done two days as was done in Saitama. FIBA accepted the proposal.

== Bracket ==
All times are local (UTC+3).

=== Championship Bracket ===
Round of 16
4 September 2010
Serbia | 73
Croatia | 72
4 September 2010
Spain | 80
Greece | 72
5 September 2010
Turkey | 95
France | 77
5 September 2010
Slovenia | 87
Australia | 58
6 September 2010
United States | 121
Angola | 66
6 September 2010
Russia | 78
New Zealand | 56
7 September 2010
Lithuania | 78
China | 67
7 September 2010
Argentina | 93
Brazil | 89

Quarter-finals
8 September 2010
Serbia | 92
Spain | 89
8 September 2010
Turkey | 95
Slovenia | 68
9 September 2010
United States | 89
Russia | 79
9 September 2010
Lithuania | 104
Argentina | 85

Semi-finals
11 September 2010
Serbia | 82
Turkey | 83
11 September 2010
United States | 89
Lithuania | 74

Final
12 September 2010
Turkey | 64
United States | 81
Third place
12 September 2010
Serbia | 88
Lithuania | 99

=== Consolation Bracket ===
Classification round
10 September 2010
Spain | 97
Slovenia | 80
10 September 2010
Russia | 61
Argentina | 73

Fifth place
12 September 2010
Spain | 81
Argentina | 86
Seventh place
11 September 2010
Slovenia | 78
Russia | 83

== Eighth–finals ==
=== Serbia vs. Croatia ===
The first eighth-final round match-up pitted two former Yugoslav republics against each other as Group A winner Serbia met Group B fourth-place finisher Croatia, the first meeting for the teams in a major international tournament. Serbia prevailed 73–72 in a back-and-forth battle that neither team led by more than eight points at any point during the game. Milan Mačvan, Serbia's youngest player at age 20, drained a three-pointer to extend Serbia's lead to 64–57 with 4:24 remaining before Croatia began a late comeback to pull within one at 68–67 with 24 seconds left in the game. Aleksandar Rašić hit two free throws to extend the lead to three with 21 seconds left before Croatia's Marko Popović answered with two free throws of his own with 15 seconds left. Marko Tomas then stole the ensuing inbounds pass and dished to Popović, who was fouled with 11 seconds left. Popović made only one of two free throws to tie the game at 70 and set up a dramatic finish.

Serbia freed Rašić with a screen on the ensuing inbounds pass and he made an uncontested layup with nine seconds left. Popović was then fouled with 5.9 seconds left, and hit both free throws to tie the game at 72. Serbia inbounded the ball to Rašić, who drove downcourt and was fouled by Croatia's Davor Kus while attempting an off-balance shot with one second left. Rašić made the first and missed the second free throw to give Serbia a one-point victory. Rašić ended up with 15 points, including eight in the fourth quarter and five in the final 21 seconds. Croatia's Popović led all scorers with 21 points to go along with five rebounds and five assists. The Oklahoma City Thunder's Nenad Krstić scored a team-high 16 points for Serbia.

4 September
18:00

Report

| Serbia | 73–72 | Croatia |
Scoring by quarter: 19–27, 15–9, 20–14, 19–22
| Pts: Krstić 16; Rebs: Tepić 7 Asts: Tepić 4 | | Pts: Popović 21; Rebs: Tomić 8 Asts: Popović 5 |

Sinan Erdem Dome, Istanbul
Attendance: 15,000
Referees: Cristiano Jesus Maranho (BRA), Anthony Dewayne Jordan (USA), Scott Jason Butler (AUS)

=== Spain vs. Greece ===
The second game of the knockout phase was a rematch of the 2006 FIBA World Championship final between Spain and Greece. Like the previous meeting, Spain prevailed, winning 80–72 over the Greeks. The game was tight for three quarters and Greece led by one entering the final quarter before Spain used an 18–6 run to pull away. Spain switched from a man-to-man defense to a zone defense to begin the fourth quarter, and Greece could not take advantage, missing nine of 12 three-pointers in the period. Juan Carlos Navarro scored a game-high 22 points and Ricky Rubio dished out six assists for Spain in the victory. Nikolaos Zisis scored 16 points for Greece in the loss.

With the victory, Spain had eliminated Greece in the knockout stage of each of the previous two FIBA World Championship and Eurobasket tournaments. Spain thus owned a five-game winning streak over the Greeks in major international competitions. This represented a reversal of the previous situation, as Greece had defeated Spain in the four previous major international competitions where the two teams had played against each other (1998 FIBA World Championship, Eurobasket 1995, Eurobasket 1993 and 1990 FIBA World Championship), while the last Greek victory over Spain (until a new victory at the Eurobasket 2013) had been in a friendly in Madrid in September, 2005. Following the loss, Greek basketball icon Dimitris Diamantidis – widely acknowledged as one of the best players in the country's history – announced his retirement from the national team.

4 September
21:00

Report

| Spain | 80–72 | Greece |
Scoring by quarter: 22–19, 15–12, 15–20, 28–21
| Pts: Navarro 22; Rebs: Reyes 10; Asts: Rubio 6 | | Pts: Zisis, Diamantidis 16; Rebs: Fotsis 7 Asts: Spanoulis 3 |

Sinan Erdem Dome, Istanbul
Attendance: 15,000
Referees: Jose Anibal Carrion (PUR), William Gene Kennedy (USA), Reynaldo Antonio Mercedes Sanchez (DOM)

=== Slovenia vs. Australia ===
In the third game of the knockout round, Slovenia cruised over Australia in an 87–58 victory. Australia stumbled out of the gate, falling behind 12–0, and never mounted a challenge against the Group B runner-up Slovenes. By halftime, Australia had nine turnovers while only making six field goals on 22% field goal shooting as Slovenia opened up a 21-point halftime lead. The Aussies were not much better in the second half, finishing 18 of 58 (31 percent) from the field and 2 of 19 from the three-point line. Slovenia, meanwhile, shot 16 of 33 from three-point range, led by Jaka Lakovič's 19 points on 5-of-11 three-point shooting. Goran Dragić added 10 points and 8 assists and all twelve Slovenian players scored as they rolled into the quarterfinal round.

With the victory, Slovenia reached the Quarterfinals in the FIBA World Championship for the first time in their short history, while Australia was knocked out in the Round of 16 for the second consecutive tournament.

5 September
18:00

Report

| Slovenia | 87–58 | Australia |
Scoring by quarter: 16–8, 26–13, 29–24, 16–13
| Pts: Lakovič 19; Rebs: Rizvić 5 Asts: Dragić 8 | | Pts: Ingles 13; Rebs: Nielsen 8 Asts: Mills 3 |

Sinan Erdem Dome, Istanbul
Attendance: 15,000
Referees: Romualdas Brazauskas (LTU), Stephen Seibel (CAN), Juan Jose Fernandez (ARG)

=== Turkey vs. France ===
Host Turkey prevailed in the day's second big blowout, beating France 95–77. Like Slovenia before them, Turkey never trailed in becoming the fourth consecutive higher-seeded team to advance to the quarterfinals. The Turks used a 21–4 run during the second and third quarters to open up a 15-point halftime lead and a 26-point third quarter lead en route to the 18-point victory. A capacity crowd was out in full force for Turkey, spending most of the second half singing in unison. Turkey guard Sinan Güler "got the shivers" from the crowd, and fed off the energy with 17 points and three assists. Hedo Türkoğlu was the star for Turkey, scoring 21 points, including four of seven from three-point range, in only 25 minutes of action. Boris Diaw was France's most consistent player in the loss, leading the team in points (21), rebounds (5), and assists (4).

France was eliminated after losing its third consecutive game, while undefeated hosts Turkey advanced to the quarterfinals for the second straight World championship.

5 September
21:00

Report

| Turkey | 95–77 | France |
Scoring by quarter: 19–14, 24–14, 28–17, 24–32
| Pts: Türkoğlu 21; Rebs: İlyasova, Aşık 5 Asts: Güler, Tunçeri, Türkoğlu 3 | | Pts: Diaw 21; Rebs: Diaw 5 Asts: Diaw, Piétrus 4 |

Sinan Erdem Dome, Istanbul
Attendance: 15,000
Referees: Pablo Alberto Estevez (ARG), Jorge Vazquez (PUR), Luigi Lamonica (ITA)

=== USA vs. Angola ===
The unbeaten US team cruised to the biggest blowout of the tournament so far, beating African champions Angola 121–66. After leading 12–4 early on the US used a 10–0 run to build a 33–13 first quarter lead and never looked back in the rout. Angola made only five of 18 shots in the first quarter in digging themselves the early hole. In three of four quarters the US scored at least thirty points, while outscoring Angola by 27 in the first and 28 in the second half. The US team shot 52.6% from the field, including 47.4% (18/38) from the three-point range. The Americans used their athletic advantages in the rebounding area by outrebounding Angola 48–23 and also recording 28 assists with just five turnovers to show their flawless offensive execution. Angola played the game shorthanded, as the team's leading scorer Olimpio Cipriano sat out with a leg injury. With Cipriano out, Joaquim Gomes scored 21 to lead the Angolan side. All twelve players scored for the United States, and four ended up in double digits. Veteran Chauncey Billups scored a team-high 19 and Kevin Durant, Rudy Gay, and Eric Gordon each had 17 points.

Unbeaten United States assured themselves a top eight finish for the 16th consecutive World Championship, while Angola failed to qualify for the quarterfinals for the second straight tournament. Despite the loss, Angola became the first African team to qualify for the knockout stage of back-to-back tournaments.

September 6
18:00

Report

| United States | 121–66 | Angola |
Scoring by quarter: 33–13, 32–25, 26–18, 30–10
| Pts: Billups 19; Rebs: Odom 8 Asts: Rose, Westbrook 6 | | Pts: Gomes 21; Rebs: Ambrosio 7 Asts: Morais 4 |

Sinan Erdem Dome, Istanbul
Attendance: 15,000
Referees: Milivoje Jovcic (SRB), Borys Ryzhyk (UKR), Samir Abaakil (MAR)

=== Russia vs. New Zealand ===
Russia provided the fourth blowout in a row by beating New Zealand 78–56. The "Tall Blacks" jumped out to an early 9–2 lead in the first quarter and ended the first quarter with a two-point advantage. The Russians then played impressive defense to regain a four-point lead at half. When New Zealand's stars Kirk Penney and Mika Vukona were sent to the bench with their fourth fouls midway through the third quarter, Russia blew the game open with a 13–0 run to expand a 38–35 lead to 51–35. The Kiwis were unable to cut the deficit below eight as Russia cruised to a 22-point victory. The Russian defense, despite the absence of injured star forward Viktor Khryapa, held New Zealand to 56 points, well below their pre-knockout stage average of 84.8 points per game. Andrey Vorontsevich had 18 points and 11 rebounds to lead the Russians and Timofey Mozgov chipped in 16 points of his own while Anton Ponkrashov dished out 7 assists. The Kiwis' leading scorer Kirk Penney again led New Zealand with 21 points despite his limited playing time and Thomas Abercrombie ended his impressive play at the World Championship with 13 points. New Zealand just shot 31.2% (15 of 48) from the field and 5 of 24 from beyond the arc.

Russia became the fifth European team to reach the quarterfinals and the sixth straight higher seeded team to advance. With New Zealand's loss, both Oceania teams were knocked out in the eighth finals for the second consecutive World Championship.

6 September
21:00

Report

| Russia | 78–56 | New Zealand |
Scoring by quarter: 13–15, 18–12, 20–13, 27–16
| Pts: Vorontsevich 18; Rebs: Vorontsevich 11; Asts: Ponkrashov 7 | | Pts: Penney 21; Rebs: Vukona 5 Asts: Penney, Vukona, Frank 2 |

Sinan Erdem Dome, Istanbul
Attendance: 15,000
Referees: Sasa Pukl (SLO), David Chambon (FRA), Marcos Fornies Benito (BRA)

=== Lithuania vs. China ===
Group D winner Lithuania continued the European dominance at this World Championship by beating China 78–67 to become the sixth European team in the quarterfinals. China got off to a good start and led 16–5 early on and by five points after the first quarter. Lithuania came back to outscore China by eight in the second quarter to take a three-point lead at halftime. In the third quarter, Lithuania locked down the Chinese offense by just allowing eleven points to stretch their lead to 13. China attempted to make it a close game in the fourth quarter, cutting the lead down to six before Lithuania's Linas Kleiza scored ten unanswered points to put the game away. Kleiza was the player of the match for Lithuania, scoring 30 points and also grabbing 9 rebounds. Liu Wei scored 21 points for the Chinese team, while team scoring leader Yi Jianlian scored 11 points and pulled down 12 rebounds.

China failed to reach the quarterfinals for the third straight year, although they were knocked the last Asian team standing for the third consecutive tournament. Lithuania reached the quarterfinal stage for the third time in their history and remains to be one of three unbeaten teams in this tournament together with the USA and Turkey.

7 September
18:00

Report

| Lithuania | 78–67 | China |
Scoring by quarter: 17–22, 26–18, 21–11, 14–16
| Pts: Kleiza 30; Rebs: Kleiza 9 Asts: Kalnietis 5 | | Pts: Liu W. 21; Rebs: Yi J.L. 12; Asts: Liu W., Wang Z.Z., Wang S.P. 3 |

Sinan Erdem Dome, Istanbul
Attendance: 15,000
Referees: Christos Christodoulou (GRE), Recep Ankarali (TUR), Yuji Hirahara (JPN)

=== Argentina vs. Brazil ===
The last eighth final match featured a South American rivalry between Argentina and Brazil. The game quickly turned into a run and gun spectacle in which no team had a bigger lead than four. The game was tied at 25–25 after the back-and-forth first quarter. Brazil took a narrow 48–46 lead into the halftime break. The third quarter was the lowest scoring quarter, as Argentina made a small comeback to tie the game. The fourth quarter was all about offense again with Leandro Barbosa and Hernán Jasen hitting threes after each other. In the end, Luis Scola made the difference with his stellar performance of 37 points and 9 rebounds. The 37 points tied Kirk Penney's tournament high in points. Marcelo Huertas gave the Brazilian team a lift by scoring 34 points. Barbosa added 20 points of his own, as did Carlos Delfino of Argentina. In the shootout, Argentina shot 57.9% from the field, including 61.1% (11/18) from three-point range, while Brazil shot 53.7% and hit half of their shots from behind the arc (12/24).

With the win, Argentina is assured of finishing in the first eight places for the fourth consecutive time, while one-time powerhouse Brazil failed to medal for the eighth straight World Championship.

7 September
21:00

Report

| Argentina | 93–89 | Brazil |
Scoring by quarter: 25–25, 21–23, 20–18, 27–23
| Pts: Scola 37; Rebs: Scola 9 Asts: Prigioni 8 | | Pts: Huertas 34; Rebs: Splitter, Varejão 5 Asts: Splitter, Barbosa, Huertas, Garcia 2 |

Sinan Erdem Dome, Istanbul
Attendance: 15,000
Referees: Carl Jungebrand (FIN), Juan Artega (ESP), Ilija Belosevic (SRB)

== Quarter–finals ==
=== Serbia vs. Spain ===
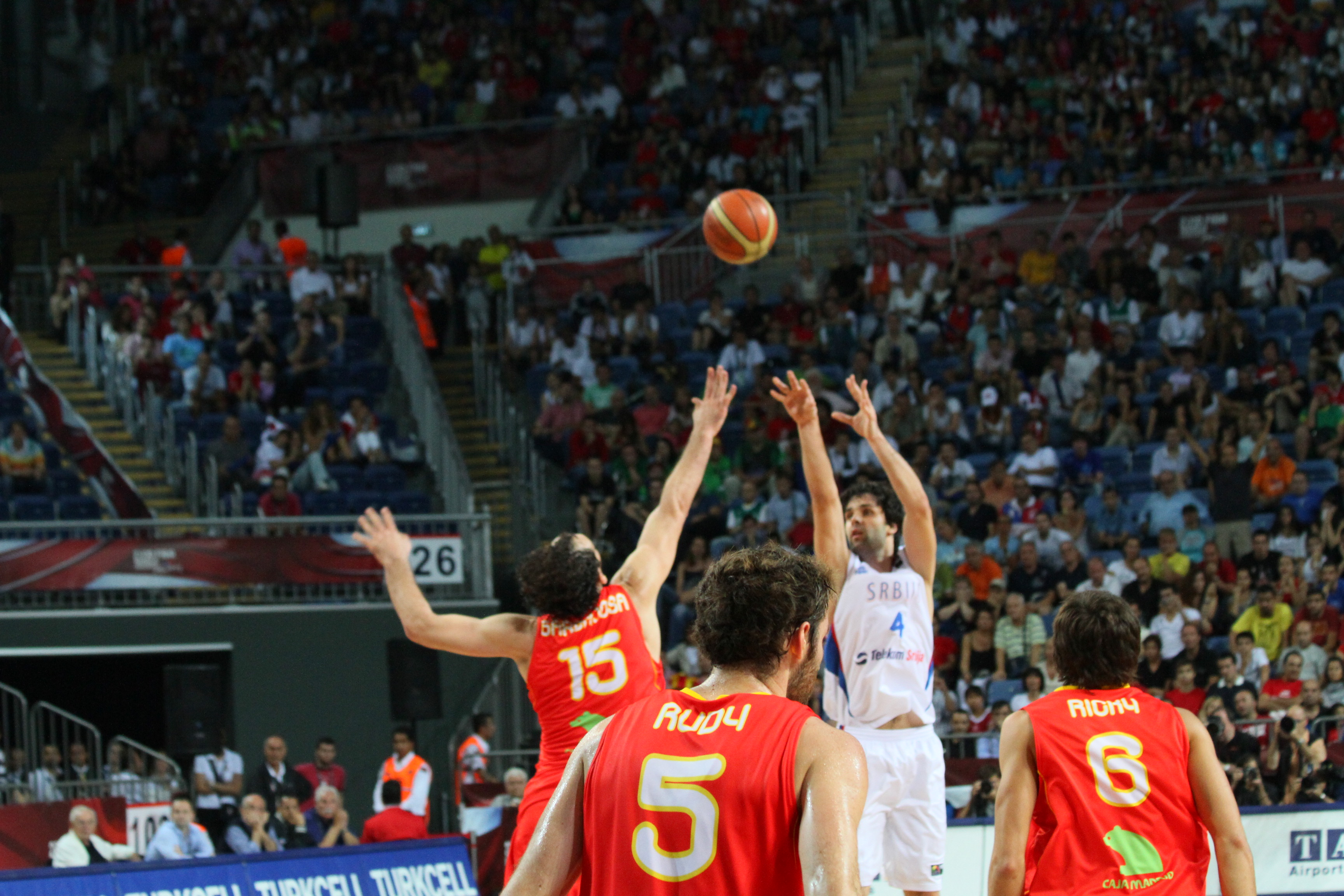
Teodosić's game-winning 3-pointer over Garbajosa

Serbia avenged their EuroBasket 2009 gold medal game loss in the first quarterfinal against Spain in a tight 92–89 victory. Both teams got off to a hot start in the early going, before Serbia went on a quick 10–0 run after Spain's Jorge Garbajosa had tied the game at 13 with a three-pointer at 13. Serbia got a great start from Nemanja Bjelica and Novica Veličković, who scored a combined 21 points in the first quarter. Despite this, Spain came back to cut the lead to just four at the first quarter break. Serbia stretched their lead in the second quarter and went into halftime with an eight-point advantage.

In the third quarter, Spain outscored the Serbian team by five to make it a three-point game heading into the fourth quarter. The fourth quarter was a back-and forth affair in which both teams went onto runs before it came down to the last seconds. Serbia found themselves up by eight points at several points in the quarter, but could not put the Spaniards away. Serbia was holding onto a slim 89–84 lead with a bit over one minute left before Juan Carlos Navarro made a three-pointer before dishing to Marc Gasol on the next possession as Spain tied the game at 89 with 25.8 seconds left in the game. On its final possession, Serbia ran the clock down until five seconds left when Miloš Teodosić took advantage of Spain's defense to make a long three-pointer with just 3.1 seconds left. Spain took a timeout to advance the ball to midcourt, but Garbajosa fumbled the inbound pass and Veličković jumped on the ball to seal the victory. Serbia displayed great team play with having six players in double-figures and recording 18 assists while hitting half of their shots from three-point range (15/30). Navarro's 27 points were not enough for Spain in the losing effort. Ricky Rubio ran into foul trouble in the fourth quarter and was held to a tournament-low three assists by Serbia.

8 September
18:00

Report

| Serbia | 92–89 | Spain |
Scoring by quarter: 27–23, 22–18, 18–23, 25–25
| Pts: Kešelj, Veličković 17; Rebs: Krstić 9 Asts: Teodosić 8 | | Pts: Navarro 27; Rebs: Garbajosa 6 Asts: Navarro 5 |

Sinan Erdem Dome, Istanbul
Attendance: 15,000
Referees: Pablo Alberto Estevez (ARG), William Gene Kennedy(USA) Michael Aylen (AUS)

=== Turkey vs. Slovenia ===
Turkey won the second quarterfinal against Slovenia in a blowout fashion 95–68 in front of an electric home crowd. Slovenia came out strong early on, led by Boštjan Nachbar, who scored seven of the team's first ten points, to take a 10–6 lead. Turkey came back with a 20–5 run to take the lead 27–14 after the first quarter. From there, the game was never in doubt; Slovenia was never able to cut the lead to single digits at any point after the first quarter. In the second quarter, Turkey's bench gave them a lift by taking a 19-point lead at halftime. Turkey shot the ball well, hitting eight of eleven from three-point range in the first half. Turkey outscored Slovenia by nine in the third quarter to take a comfortable 71–43 lead into the last quarter. The last quarter was essentially a victory lap for the Turkish team, as the starters took places on the bench to give playing time to the second unit. Turkey ended the game hitting a tournament-high 71% of the field, 10 of 17 from behind the arc, and recording 24 assists. Slovenia meanwhile struggled offensively, shooting just 35.7% from the field. Ersan İlyasova scored 19 points to lead Turkey. Eleven of twelve Turkish players scored and Hedo Türkoğlu dished out with 7 assists. Sani Bečirovič and Nachbar both had 16 points for the Slovenian team.

With the victory, Turkey became the first host team to reach the final four since Greece advanced to the semifinals at the 1998 FIBA World Championship in Athens. The Turks also assured themselves of their best ever performance at the World Championship. Slovenia improved upon 2006's eighth final performance, reaching the quarterfinals in their second ever World Championship appearance.

8 September
21:00

Report

| Turkey | 95–68 | Slovenia |
Scoring by quarter: 27–14, 23–17, 21–12, 24–25
| Pts: İlyasova 19; Rebs: İlyasova, Erden, Aşık 5 Asts: Türkoğlu 7 | | Pts: Bečirovič, Nachbar 16; Rebs: Brezec 5 Asts: Bečirovič 6 |

Sinan Erdem Dome, Istanbul
Attendance: 15,000
Referees: Jose Anibal Carrion (PUR), Anthony Dewayne Jordan (USA), Cristiano Jesus Maranho (BRA)

=== USA vs. Russia ===
The United States and Russia reignited their rivalry in the quarterfinals on the thirty-eighth anniversary of the Soviet Union's gold medal victory over the United States at the 1972 Summer Olympics. On this occasion, the Americans prevailed, winning 89–79 to reach the semifinals. In the first half, the Russians looked to give the Americans a stiff challenge, as big men Andrey Vorontsevich (14 points, 12 rebounds) and Timofey Mozgov (13 points (9 in the first quarter), 4 rebounds) controlled the middle. The United States struggled from the field, missing 17 of their first 25 shots as Russia built a 35–30 lead midway through the second quarter. On the verge of trailing at halftime for only the second time in the tournament, the Americans answered with a quick 12–0 run and entered halftime with a five-point lead.

Leading 50–45 in the third quarter, Russell Westbrook sparked the United States with seven points and three steals over a three-minute stretch in the third quarter to help the United States open up a 65–50 lead. The Americans dominated from there, leading by as many as 17 and never letting Russia back within single digits en route to the victory. Kevin Durant scored a game-high 33 points as the Americans moved two wins away from their first World Championship since 1994. Westbrook scored ten of his twelve points in the second half to spark the Americans, while Lamar Odom added 12 rebounds. Sergei Bykov scored a game-high 17 points for Russia, while Russian big men Vorontsevich, Mozgov, and Sergei Monia performed well, helping the Russians outrebound the Americans 45–38. Turnovers proved Russia's undoing, however, as the quick American team forced 18 turnovers, including 14 steals.

With the victory, the United States moves to the semifinals with a perfect 7–0 record for the second consecutive World Championship. Russia fell to the consolation bracket, although their quarterfinal appearance assured they would have their best result since finishing second at the 1998 FIBA World Championship.

9 September
18:00

Report

| United States | 89–79 | Russia |
Scoring by quarter: 25–25, 19–14, 26–17, 19–23
| Pts: Durant 33; Rebs: Odom 12; Asts: Billups 5 | | Pts: Bykov 17; Rebs: Vorontsevich 12; Asts: Khvostov 5 |

Sinan Erdem Dome, Istanbul
Attendance: 15,000
Referees: Reynaldo Antonio Mercedes Sanchez (DOM), José Martín (ESP), Jakob Zamojski (POL)

=== Lithuania vs. Argentina ===
Lithuania blew out Argentina in the last quarterfinal of the tournament 104–85. The game started even before Lithuania went on an 8–0 run to lead 17–10 midway through the first quarter. Argentina answered with a 5–0 run on their own but Lithuania closed out the quarter 11–3 to stretch the lead to ten. From there, the game was never really in doubt after Lithuania hit their first eight three-pointers and the lead grew to twenty (50–30) at halftime. The third quarter started with a quick 6–0 run for Lithuania to stretch the lead to 26 before Pablo Prigioni finally made the first three-pointer of the day for Argentina, after missing their first eleven, with 4:47 left in the third quarter. The lead was 32 after three quarters until a late run by Argentina brought the final deficit down to 19. All seven players that scored for Lithuania ended up in double-figures, led by Simas Jasaitis with 19. Linas Kleiza, the Lithuanians' high scorer for the tournament, scored 17 points and grabbed nine rebounds. Carlos Delfino was the leading scorer for Argentina with 25, while the overall tournament scoring leader Luis Scola struggled by hitting just five of his 13 shots for 13 points. Argentina made only four of their 21 tries from behind the arc, while Lithuania made half of their shots from three-point range (12 of 24).

Number-one ranked Argentina lost in the quarterfinals after reaching the semifinals at each of their last four major international tournaments (two Olympics and two World Championships). Unbeaten Lithuania qualified for the World Championship semifinals for the first time in their history, after finishing seventh in each of their first two appearances (1998 and 2006). All four group winners advanced to the semifinals for the second straight time under the new format that FIBA unveiled in 2006.

9 September
21:00

Report

| Lithuania | 104–85 | Argentina |
Scoring by quarter: 28–18, 22–12, 35–23, 19–32
| Pts: Jasaitis 19; Rebs: Kleiza 9 Asts: Kalnietis, Jankūnas 5 | | Pts: Delfino 25; Rebs: Oberto, Jasen 5 Asts: Prigioni 6 |

Sinan Erdem Dome, Istanbul
Attendance: 15,000
Referees: Jorge Vasquez (PUR), Guerrino Cerebuch (ITA), Scott Jason Butler (AUS)

== Fifth–eighth classification ==
=== Spain vs. Slovenia ===
Defending world champions Spain overcame a sluggish start to beat Slovenia 97–80 in the first consolation round game. The pre-tournament favorites showed some signs of wear after their emotional quarterfinal loss to Serbia in the early going, missing eight of their first ten shots, as Slovenia opened up a seven-point first quarter lead. From there, Spain settled in and the lead changed hands several times over the next two quarters before Spain entered the fourth quarter leading 64–62. Sergio Llull hit his only two baskets of the game, both three-pointers, and Juan Carlos Navarro added two more threes as Spain blew the game open with a 15–6 late run. The Spaniards eventually won by seventeen in a game that was far closer than the final score line indicates. Navarro led Spain with 26 points, while Rudy Fernández and Fran Vázquez pitched in with 16 each. Jaka Lakovič and Goran Dragić paced Slovenia with 19 points each. With the victory, Spain kept its hopes alive for finishing in the top five in four consecutive World Championship tournaments.

10 September
18:00

Report

| Spain | 97–80 | Slovenia |
Scoring by quarter: 16–23, 22–18, 26–21, 33–18
| Pts: Navarro 26; Rebs: Reyes 10; Asts: Navarro 7 | | Pts: Lakovič, Dragić 19; Rebs: Brezec 9 Asts: Lakovič 4 |

Sinan Erdem Dome, Istanbul
Attendance: 15,000
Referees: Romualdas Brazauskas (LTU), Murat Biricik (TUR), Olegs Latisevs (LAT)

=== Russia vs. Argentina ===
The second consolation bracket game was all Luis Scola and Carlos Delfino as the Argentine duo combined for 53 of Argentina's 73 total points in a 73–61 victory over Russia. The game was a tight defensive struggle for most of the game before Argentina used a late fourth quarter run to pull away. Russia had gotten within two at 58–56 on Timofey Mozgov's bucket with 6:50 to play before Argentina outscored the Russians 17–5 the rest of the way. Only four players scored more than one basket for Argentina, with Fabricio Oberto adding 10 and Pablo Prigioni scoring 5. Mozgov scored 10 points and grabbed 11 rebounds to pace Russia, while Sergei Monia scored a team-high 17 points.

With the victory, Argentina advances to the fifth-place game versus Spain, in a rematch of the 2006 FIBA World Championship semifinal. Many predicted that this matchup – between world number one Argentina and defending champion Spain – could be for the final before the tournament. Russia will face Slovenia in the seventh place game.

10 September
21:00

Report

| Russia | 61–73 | Argentina |
Scoring by quarter: 11–15, 22–21, 19–18, 9–19
| Pts: Monia 17; Rebs: Mozgov 11; Asts: Ponkrashov 4 | | Pts: Scola 27; Rebs: Delfino 7 Asts: Prigioni 5 |

Sinan Erdem Dome, Istanbul
Attendance: 15,000
Referees: Anthony Dewayne Jordan (USA), Srdan Dozai (CRO), Eddie Viator (FRA)

=== Seventh–place game ===
Russia ended their World Championship campaign with a victory after beating Slovenia 83–78. Slovenia outplayed Russia in a sloppy first half that included only four total points in the first five minutes of the second quarter. Slovenia used a late 7–0 run to lead 37–30 at halftime. Slovenia opened up the second half with a quick run to lead by 14 midway through the third quarter before Russia trimmed the lead back down to seven at the end of the third quarter. Russia started the fourth quarter strong with a 12–0 run to take the lead 64–62 before Slovenia made two three-pointers to take back the lead. Vitaly Fridzon was the Russian hero of the day as he scored 15 of his 17 points in the final quarter. Slovenian star Boštjan Nachbar chipped in 11 of his game-high 20 points in the final six minutes, including a three-pointer that gave Slovenia a five-point 74–69 lead with 2:31 left. Russia answered with a 14–4 run in the last 2:15, led by Timofey Mozgov, who scored seven of his team-high 19 points in the final 82 seconds of the game.

After finished 12th at the last World Championships, Slovenia achieved the eighth place, the best finish in their short history, while Russia ended up in seventh place for its best finish since 1998.

11 September
15:00

Report

| Slovenia | 78–83 | Russia |
Scoring by quarter: 23–21, 14–9, 22–22, 19–31
| Pts: Nachbar 20; Rebs: Slokar 7 Asts: Dragić 7 | | Pts: Mozgov 19; Rebs: Monia 7 Asts: Bykov 7 |

Sinan Erdem Dome, Istanbul
Attendance: 15,000
Referees: Guerrino Cerebuch (ITA), Recep Anakrali (TUR), Fernando Rocha(POR)

=== Fifth–place game ===
Spain and Argentina met in the fifth place game in a match billed by the media as the "clash for crumbs" after both teams fell short of expectations as pre-tournament favorites. The majority of the game was surprisingly uncompetitive, as Argentina never trailed at any point in the game. After extending a 17-point halftime lead to 25 on Carlos Delfino's three-pointer with 6:45 left in the third quarter, Spain mounted a furious comeback. Rudy Fernández scored eleven points and Sergio Llull added seven more during a 28–6 run over the last 6:30 of the third quarter that trimmed Argentina's lead to 65–62 entering the final quarter. From there, the Spaniards could never get over the hump, as Argentina hung onto the narrow lead. After Marc Gasol hit one of two free throws to tie the game at 80 with 2:11 left – the first tie since it was 4–4 in the opening minutes – Luis Scola made a basket and Pablo Prigioni followed with a dagger three-pointer as the shot clock expired to give Argentina a commanding four-point lead with 15 seconds left.

Fernández led all scorers with 31 points in the losing effort. Argentine stars Delfino (27 points), Scola (22 points, 11 rebounds), and Prigioni (17 points, 7 assists) continued to pace Argentina. With his 22 points, Scola likely locked up the tournament's scoring title; only a monumental performance from the USA's Kevin Durant could top him. The Argentines sealed fifth place after finishing second and fourth in the last two World Championships while the Spaniards finished below fifth place for the first time since 1994.

12 September
15:00

Report

| Spain | 81–86 | Argentina |
Scoring by quarter: 16–23, 16–26, 30–16, 19–21
| Pts: Fernández 31; Rebs: Gasol 10; Asts: San Emeterio, Fernández, Navarro, Llull 3 each | | Pts: Delfino 27; Rebs: Scola 11; Asts: Prigioni 7 |

Sinan Erdem Dome, Istanbul
Attendance: 15,000
Referees: Jose Anibal Carrion (PUR), Ilija Belosevic (SRB), Scott Jason Butler (AUS)

== Semifinals ==
=== USA vs. Lithuania ===
The US team continued their unbeaten streak at the World Championship by beating Lithuania 89–74. In the first quarter, Lithuania held an early 11–9 lead before the US took the game over with 12 unanswered points, while holding Lithuania without a field goal over a six-minute stretch in the first and second quarters. Kevin Durant was the star early on as he outscored the entire Lithuanian team with 17 points in the first quarter. The Lithuanians finished the first quarter by missing their final eight shots after starting out shooting 5-for-8. The Americans led by eleven to start the second quarter and were able to grow the lead to 17 at halftime. Lithuania made an early push in the third period to cut the lead to ten before the USA answered with a 9–0 run to widen the lead to 19. Tomas Delininkaitis scored eight points in a row to bring his team back within 10, but the Lithuanians could not cut the lead to single digits. Late in the fourth quarter, Durant put the game away with his fifth three-pointer to give the USA an 84–67 lead en route to the fifteen-point victory.

Durant was the top scorer with a tournament-high 38 points, topping the all-time US record for most points in a game. Lamar Odom had a double-double with 13 points and 10 rebounds to go along 3 blocked shots, while Andre Iguodala recorded four steals and held Lithuanian top scorer Linas Kleiza to just four points on 1 for 11 shooting, the only time all tournament that he was held in single digits. Robertas Javtokas led Lithuania with 15 points, and was the only Lithuanian scorer to shoot more than 50% on the afternoon.

Lithuania will play in the bronze medal game and have a chance to win a medal for the first time in their history, while the USA put themselves to win a record-setting fourth title that would be its first since the 1994 World Championship. With the victory, the USA assured that they will regain the Number One ranking in the FIBA World Ranking from Argentina following the tournament.

11 September
19:00

Report

| United States | 89–74 | Lithuania |
Scoring by quarter: 23–12, 19–15, 23–26, 24–21
| Pts: Durant 38; Rebs: Odom 10; Asts: Billups, Rose, Westbrook 3 | | Pts: Javtokas 15; Rebs: Javtokas 9 Asts: Kalnietis, Mačiulis, Pocius, Delininkaitis 2 |

Sinan Erdem Dome, Istanbul
Attendance: 15,000
Referees: Carl Jungebrand (FIN), Sasa Pukl (SLO), Marcos Fornies Benito (BRA)

=== Serbia vs. Turkey ===
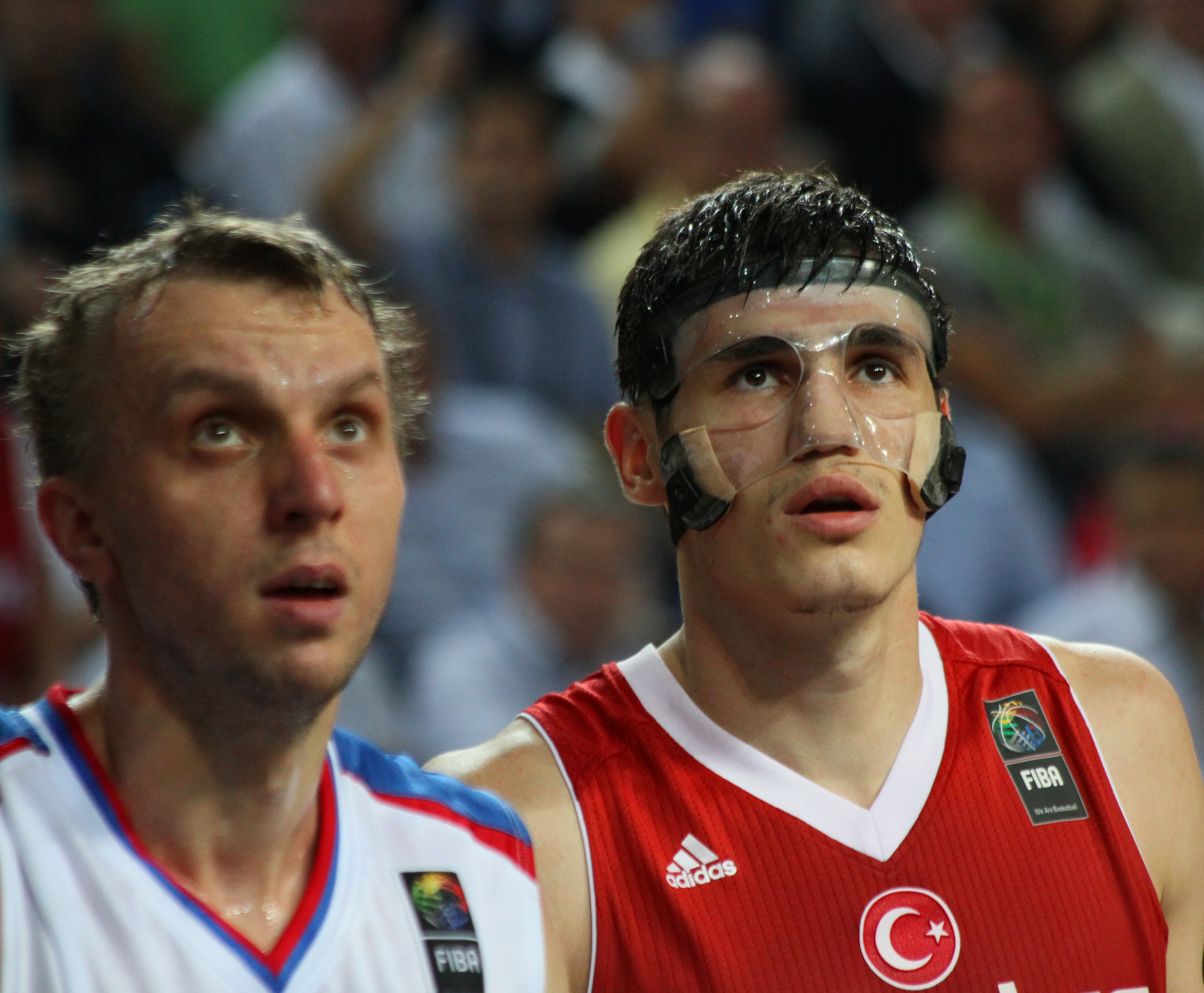
Duško Savanović & Ersan İlyasova during the match

The second semifinal provided the most thrilling finish of the tournament as the hosts were able to keep their magical run alive with an 83–82 victory over Serbia. Serbia controlled the game for much of the first half, leading by three at the end of the first quarter before growing their lead to 7 in the second quarter to lead 42–35 at halftime. Turkey came out firing in the second half, scoring 25 in the third quarter to cut the lead to three before the fourth quarter. Turkey hung tight for most of the second half, never leading but never falling behind by double digits as Serbia could not separate themselves from the Turks. Serbian star Miloš Teodosić hit a three-pointer with 5:36 left to give Serbia a 72–64 lead to match their biggest lead of the game. Turkey came roaring back following Teodosić's three, going on a 14–3 run over the next two minutes. Kerem Tunçeri, who scored eight of Turkey's 14 points during the run, hit a three-pointer with 3:25 left gave Turkey its first lead since it was 4–3 early in the first quarter to set up the thrilling finish.

After both teams exchanged free throws over the next few minutes, Serbia got the lead back with 28 seconds left when Marko Kešelj hit two free throws. On the ensuing possession, Turkey's Semih Erden got a dunk and a foul with 16.8 seconds to go. He missed the free throw and Serbia had the chance to win it. Novica Veličković hit a shot with four seconds left to give Serbia an 82–81 lead and set up a frantic finish. After a timeout, Turkey inbounded the ball to Hedo Türkoğlu near midcourt; Türkoğlu mishandled the ball but it fell right to Tunçeri who drove along the baseline for an uncontested layup as the buzzer sounded, sending the home crowd into a frenzy. An official review put 0.5 seconds back on the clock, and Serbia had one last chance for a miracle. On the ensuing inbounds pass, Duško Savanović hit a streaking Veličković in front of the basket for an alley-oop, but Erden got a hand on the ball to deflect the shot and preserve the historic victory for Turkey.

Tunçeri was the hero for Turkey, scoring 10 of his 12 points in the final 5:16, while Türkoğlu scored a team-high 16 points. Big men Kešelj (18 points, 7 rebounds) and Nenad Krstić (15 points, 7 rebounds) paced Serbia in the loss. Teodosić continued his strong tournament performance, tying a tournament high with 11 assists. With the victory, Turkey advanced to the final against the US, ensuring themselves their first ever FIBA World Championship medal in the process. They are the first host team to make the final since Yugoslavia in 1970. Serbia, unable to win a third straight knockout stage game in the final seconds, will play in the bronze medal game against Lithuania in an attempt to win a third medal in the last four World Championship tournaments.

After the game, Serbian players and media blamed the referees and FIBA for their loss, because of several decisions in the last minutes of the game they deemed suspicious. A few days after the game, Serbian media have published an amateur video showing Kerem Tunçeri stepping out of bounds before making the decisive last-second layup for Turkish victory.

11 September
21:30

Report

| Serbia | 82–83 | Turkey |
Scoring by quarter: 20–17, 22–18, 21–25, 19–23
| Pts: Kešelj 18; Rebs: Kešelj, Krstić 7 Asts: Teodosić 11 | | Pts: Türkoğlu 16; Rebs: Aşık 7 Asts: Tunçeri 5 |

Sinan Erdem Dome, Istanbul
Attendance: 15,000
Referees: Jose Anibal Carrion (PUR), Pablo Alberto Estevez (ARG), Reynaldo Antonio Mercedes Sanchez (DOM)

== Third–place game ==
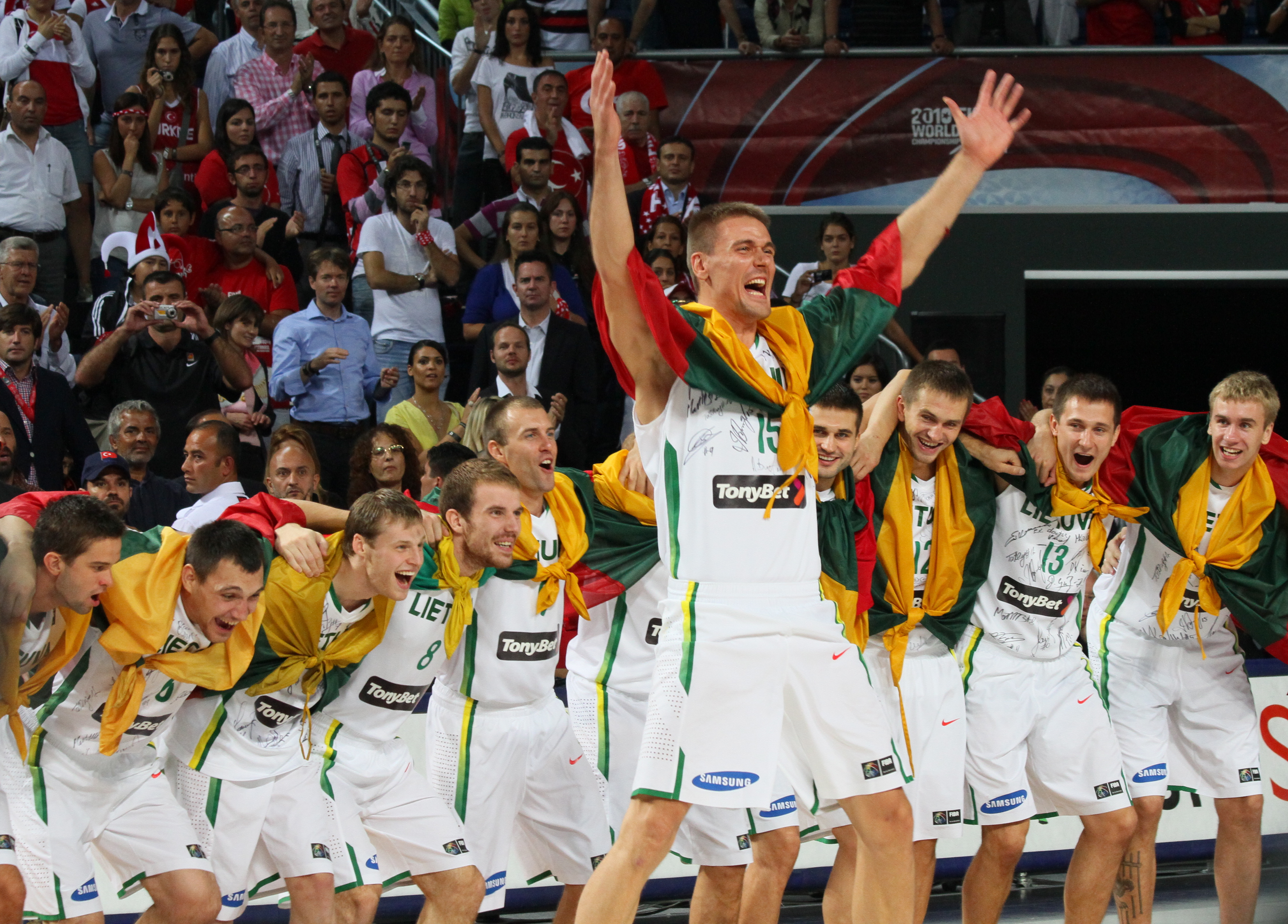
Lithuania win bronze medal

In the bronze medal match, it was all about offense as Lithuania defeated Serbia 99–88. Serbia got the better start, and led 18–9 midway through the first quarter before Lithuania came back with a 14–4 run to take a one-point lead at the first break. In the second quarter, Lithuania used their hot shooting and some minor runs to open up a ten-point halftime lead. The third quarter was more of the same; Lithuania was the better team and extended their lead to 22 at one point before Serbia cut the lead to 18 heading into the final quarter. Neither team missed many shots in the back-and-forth final quarter. Serbia could not cut the deficit below double digits, as Lithuania shot consistently and hung on for the 11-point victory.

Serbia shot 60.5% on two-point shots but made just six of 17 from behind the arc while Lithuania shot 52.2% from three-point range and 59% overall. Linas Kleiza bounced back from his poor performance yesterday and scored 33 points on 12 of 18 shooting, and Simas Jasaitis had a double-double with 14 points and ten rebounds. Novica Veličković led Serbia with 18 points while Aleksandar Rašić dished out ten assists. With the victory, Lithuania won their first ever medal at a World Championship. Serbia finished in fourth place in their first tournament competing under the name Serbia, after previous appearances as the Federal Republic of Yugoslavia and Serbia and Montenegro.

12 September
19:00

Report

| Serbia | 88–99 | Lithuania |
Scoring by quarter: 22–23, 16–25, 16–24, 34–27
| Pts: Veličković 18; Rebs: Krstić 8 Asts: Rašić 10 | | Pts: Kleiza 33; Rebs: Jasaitis 10; Asts: Kleiza 4 |

Sinan Erdem Dome, Istanbul
Attendance: 15,000
Referees: Jorge Vasquez (PUR), Anthony Dewayne Jordan (USA), Christos Christodoulou (GRE)

== Final ==
In a matchup of the only two unbeaten teams remaining in the tournament, USA captured its record-setting fourth World Championship with an 81–64 victory over Turkey. Kevin Durant again led the Americans, scoring 28 points while Lamar Odom added 15 points and 11 rebounds. With the title, USA also qualifies for the 2012 Summer Olympic tournament. Hosts Turkey ended their tournament run in front of the home crowd by capturing the silver medal, its first medal of any kind in one of the two major international tournaments.

12 September
21:30

Report

| Turkey | 64–81 | United States |
Scoring by quarter: 17–22, 15–20, 16–19, 16–20
| Pts: Türkoğlu 16; Rebs: İlyasova 11; Asts: Tunçeri 5 | | Pts: Durant 28; Rebs: Odom 11; Asts: Rose 6 |

Sinan Erdem Dome, Istanbul
Attendance: 15,000
Referees: Cristiano Jesus Maranho (BRA), Luigi Lamonica (ITA), Juan Arteaga (ESP)
