= Selçuk Ernak =

Turkish basketball player (born 1970)

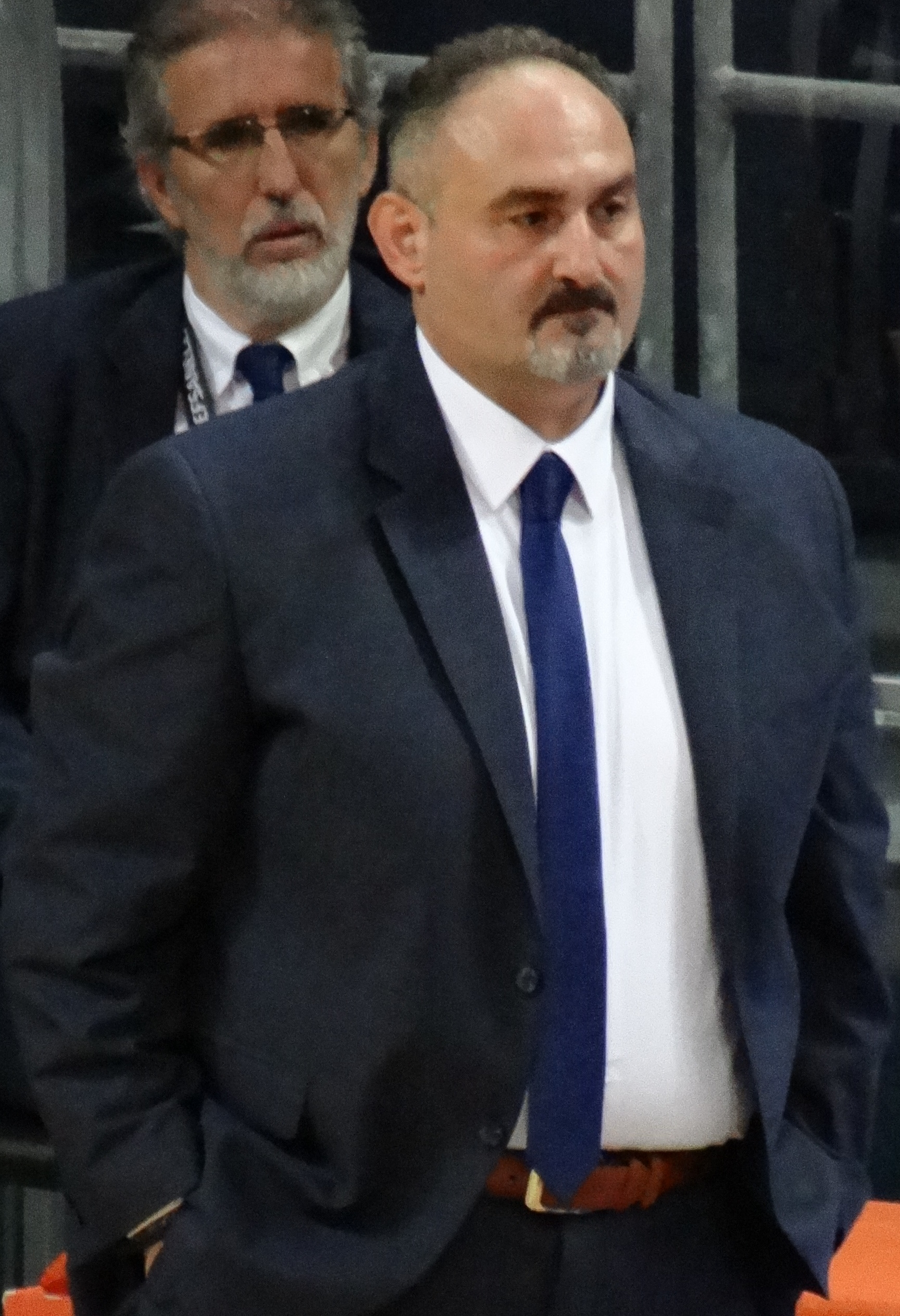
- Ernak coaching Sakarya in 2018

Personal information
- Born: August 25, 1970 (age 56) Istanbul, Turkey
- Position: Head coach
- Coaching career: 2006–present

Career history

Coaching
- 2006–2007: Banvit (assistant)
- 2007–2009: Banvit
- 2007: China (assistant)
- 2009–2011: Banvit (youth)
- 2011–2014: Bandırma Kırmızı
- 2014–2015: Banvit (assistant)
- 2015–2016: Banvit
- 2016–2018: Sakarya BB
- 2018–2023: Darüşşafaka
- 2023–2024: Türk Telekom
- 2024–2025: Anwil Włocławek
- 2025–2026: Trabzonspor

Career highlights
- PLK Coach of the Year (2025); Turkish First League champion (2017)

Burak Selçuk Ernak (born August 25, 1970, in Istanbul, Turkey) is a Turkish former professional basketball player, he was most recently the head coach of Trabzonspor of the Basketbol Süper Ligi (BSL).

== Coaching career ==
In the 2016–17 season, Ernak led his team Sakarya BB to promotion to the first tier Basketbol Süper Ligi for the first time in club history.

On December 1, 2018, Ernak parted ways with Sakarya after disagreements. On December 12, 2018, Ernak signed a two-year contract with Darüşşafaka. Darüşşafaka also played in the EuroLeague which meant the EuroLeague debut for Ernak.

On October 27, 2023 he signed with Türk Telekom of the Turkish Basketbol Süper Ligi (BSL). Ernak finished the 2023-24 Basketbol Süper Ligi regular season 8th place.

On June 28, 2024, he signed with Anwil Włocławek of the Polish Basketball League (PLK).

On May 10, 2025, Ernak gathered the most votes to become the Best Coach Award in Polish Basketball League (PLK).

On July 4, 2025, he signed with Trabzonspor of the Basketbol Süper Ligi (BSL).
