= Kenny Gabriel =

American basketball player (born 1989)

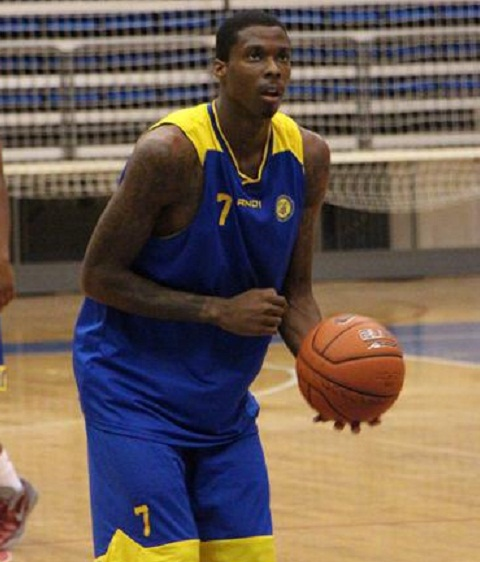
- Gabriel with Maccabi Ashdod in 2012

CS Vâlcea 1924
- Position: Power forward
- League: Liga Națională

Personal information
- Born: July 3, 1989 (age 37) Charlotte, North Carolina, U.S.
- Listed height: 6 ft 9 in (2.06 m)
- Listed weight: 218 lb (99 kg)

Career information
- High school: United Faith Christian Academy (Charlotte, North Carolina)
- College: Paris JC (2008–2009); Auburn (2009–2012)
- NBA draft: 2012: undrafted
- Playing career: 2012–present

Career history
- 2012: Maccabi Ashdod
- 2013: AEL Limassol
- 2013: Taranaki Mountainairs
- 2013–2014: Rethymno Aegan
- 2014–2016: Pınar Karşıyaka
- 2016: Lokomotiv Kuban
- 2016–2018: Panathinaikos
- 2018–2019: Türk Telekom
- 2019–2020: College Park Skyhawks
- 2020–2021: Mornar Bar
- 2021–2024: Brescia Leonessa
- 2024–2025: Fortitudo Bologna
- 2025–: CS Vâlcea 1924

Career highlights
- Greek League champion (2017, 2018); Greek Cup winner (2017); Turkish League champion (2015); 2× Turkish Super League All-Star MVP (2016, 2019); 2× Turkish All-Star (2016, 2019); TBL Slam Dunk Contest winner (2015); All-Greek League Second Team (2014); Greek League rebounding leader (2014); Greek All Star Game Slam Dunk Contest winner (2014)
- Stats at Basketball Reference

Kenneth Benard Gabriel (born July 3, 1989) is an American professional basketball player for CS Vâlcea 1924 of the Romanian Liga Națională. At a height of 6 ft 9 in (2.06 m) tall, he plays at the power forward position. He played college basketball for the Auburn Tigers.

== High school ==
Gabriel attended United Faith Christian Academy, in Charlotte, North Carolina, where he also played high school basketball.

== College career ==
Gabriel played college basketball at Paris Junior College (NJCAA), and at Auburn (NCAA Division I), where he played with the Auburn Tigers. In his senior season, Gabriel averaged 12.2 points, 7.3 rebounds and 2.3 blocks per game and was named the team's MVP.

== Professional career ==
On August 10, 2012, Gabriel signed his first professional contract with the Israeli League club Maccabi Ashdod. On November 20, 2012, he parted ways with Ashdod, after appearing in five games. In that season, he also played with AEL Limassol of the Cypriot League, and Taranaki Mountainairs of the New Zealand National Basketball League.

In the summer of 2013, Gabriel signed for the Greek League club Rethymno Aegan, for the 2013–14 season.

On June 28, 2014, Gabriel signed a one-year deal to play in Turkey, with the Turkish League club Pınar Karşıyaka. In July 2015, he won the Turkish League championship with Karşıyaka, after his team beat Anadolu Efes 4–1 in the league's finals. On August 3, 2015, he re-signed with Karşıyaka, for one more season.

On August 8, 2016, Gabriel signed a two-year deal with Russian club Lokomotiv Kuban. On November 24, 2016, he left Lokomotiv and signed with Greek club Panathinaikos for the rest of the season.

On June 28, 2017, after having won both domestic titles with Panathinaikos, Gabriel renewed his contract with the Greek champions for three (1+1+1) years. His team option was declined on June 25, 2018, and he was compensated with a buy-out.

On June 26, 2018, he returned to Turkey and signed with Türk Telekom.

On October 28, 2019, the College Park Skyhawks, the G League team owned by the Atlanta Hawks, invited Gabriel to their training camp as an affiliate player. On December 20, Gabriel tallied 19 points, nine rebounds, three assists and one steal in a win against the Austin Spurs. He averaged 7.6 points and 4.8 rebounds in 20.1 minutes per game for College Park. On July 18, 2020, Gabriel signed with Mornar Bar of the ABA League and the Montenegrin League. He averaged 8 points and 2.8 rebounds per game. On July 23, 2021, Gabriel signed with Basket Brescia Leonessa of the Lega Basket Serie A.

On July 24, 2024, Gabriel signed with Fortitudo Bologna of the Serie A2.

== Career statistics ==
Legend
GP	Games played	GS	Games started	MPG	Minutes per game
FG%	Field-goal percentage	3P%	3-point field-goal percentage	FT%	Free-throw percentage
RPG	Rebounds per game	APG	Assists per game	SPG	Steals per game
BPG	Blocks per game	PPG	Points per game	PIR	Performance index rating
**Bold**	Career high

=== EuroLeague ===
Year	Team	GP	GS	MPG	FG%	3P%	FT%	RPG	APG	SPG	BPG	PPG	PIR
2015–16	Pınar Karşıyaka	10	10	**27.4**	**.622**	.326	**.900**	**4.6**	**1.3**	**0.8**	**0.7**	**9.7**	**10.7**
2016–17	Panathinaikos	23	**12**	15.5	.523	**.408**	.778	3.0	0.3	0.5	0.4	5.2	5.1
2017–18	Panathinaikos	**33**	1	11.1	.607	.288	.333	2.4	0.2	0.3	0.3	2.9	2.5
Career		66	23	18.0	.578	.335	.675	3.0	0.6	0.5	0.5	6.9	6.1
