= Ömer Ünver =

Turkish basketball player

Personal information
- Born: July 26, 1981 (age 45) Afyon, Turkey
- Listed height: 6 ft 7 in (2.01 m)

Career information
- Playing career: 2003–present
- Position: Small forward

Career history
- 2003–2004: Tofaş
- 2004–2006: Tuborg Pilsener
- 2006–2008: CASA TED Kolejliler

Ömer Ünver (born 26 July 1981 in Afyon, Turkey) is a Turkish professional basketball player for Beşiktaş Cola Turka and has great 3pt-shooting skills. He won the 3pt-Shootout in the Allstar Weekend 2008.
