= Sinan Erdem Dome =

Multi-purpose indoor arena in Istanbul, Turkey

Sinan Erdem Spor Salonu
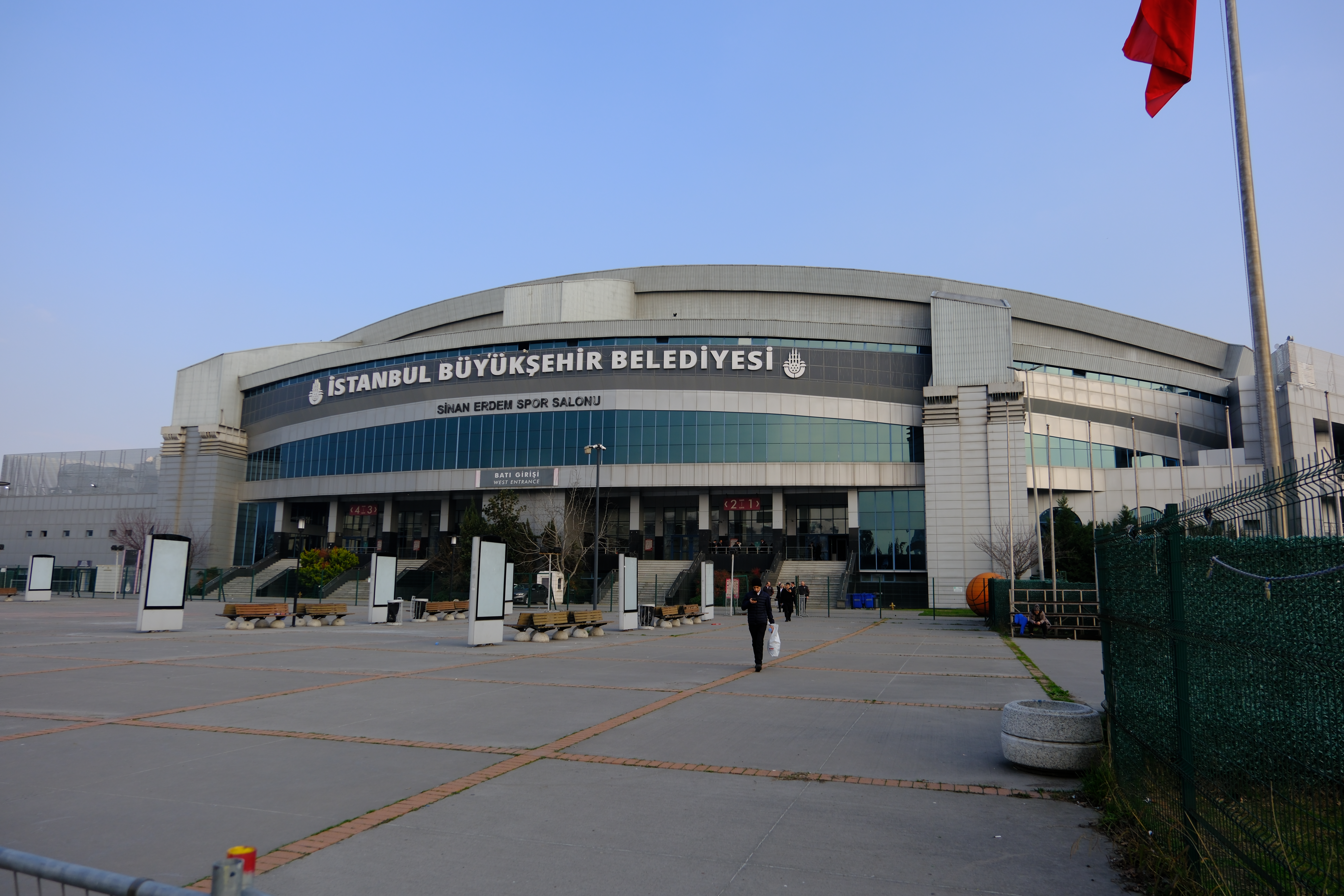
- Interactive map of Sinan Erdem Spor Salonu
- Former names: Ataköy Dome
- Location: Ataköy, Bakırköy, Istanbul, Turkey
- Coordinates: 40°59′18.78″N 28°51′14.15″E
- Owner: Istanbul Metropolitan Municipality – Spor A.Ş.
- Capacity: Basketball: 16,000; Tennis: 16,457; Concerts: 22,500

Construction
- Opened: April 23, 2010; 16 years ago
- Renovated: 2017
- Cost: € 22 million – original construction cost (2003); US$ 47 million – remodel construction cost (2010) ($69.4 million in 2025 dollars)

Tenants
- Turkish national basketball team (2010–present); Anadolu Efes (2010–2012, 2017–2024); Fenerbahçe (2010–2012); Galatasaray (2017–2024, 2026–); Beşiktaş (2015–2016, 2024–2025); Bahçeşehir Koleji (2024–present)

The Sinan Erdem Dome (Turkish: Sinan Erdem Spor Salonu), formerly known as the Ataköy Dome, is a multi-purpose indoor arena that is located in Ataköy, Bakırköy on the European side of Istanbul, Turkey.

It has a seating capacity of 22,500 for concerts. For the sport of basketball, it has a seating capacity of 16,000, and for the sport of tennis, it has a seating capacity of 16,457 people, making it Turkey's largest multi-purpose indoor venue, and the third largest in Europe (although it is not the third largest in Europe in capacity for basketball use). The arena is named after Sinan Erdem (1927–2003), a former Turkish volleyball player who was the President of the Turkish National Olympic Committee, from 1989, until his death in 2003.

== Structure of the building ==
Sinan Erdem Dome has a steel roof structure, in a spherical shell form, with a dimensional span of 112 m × 154 m (367 ft × 505 ft). It also has two planar faces on each side, which forms an overall shuttle like geometry. The main load bearing supports of the arena's structure are 6 reinforced concrete twin columns, with an r/c support mass, which holds the tail section of the roof's form. The head section of the roof is fixed to the existing structure.

The steel trusses have fixed supports on top of twin columns. The top and bottom chords are made up of circular hollow sections, which form a triangular shape. There are three main trusses and secondary circular girders that rest on them, which builds up the skeleton structure, while trapezoidal steel sheet covers complete the roofing system. The steel roof and its supports are separate from the tribune structure, constituting an independent structure by itself.

== History ==
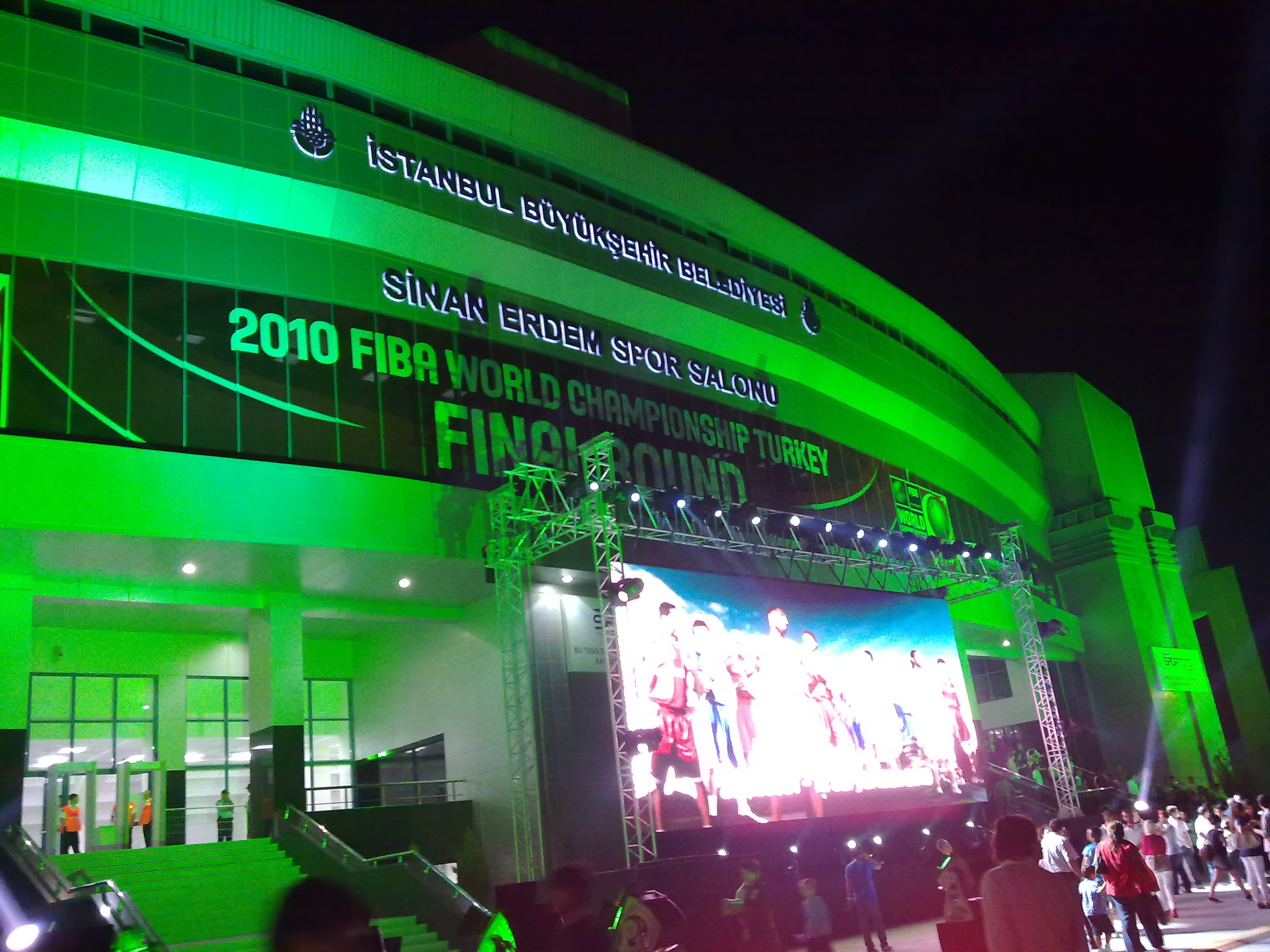
The venue during 2010 FIBA World Championship opening ceremony.

Sinan Erdem Dome hosted the basketball 2010 FIBA World Championship's knockout stage and final. During the 2010 FIBA World Championship, most of the arena's 16,000 seats were placed on temporary stands, which were built on top of the arena's permanent stands.

Sinan Erdem Dome has also hosted the following major sporting events: the tennis 2011 WTA Tour Championships, the EuroLeague's 2012 Euroleague Final Four, the tennis 2012 WTA Tour Championships, the 2012 FINA World Swimming Championships (25 m), and the tennis 2013 WTA Tour Championships.

The arena is also the host site of the major basketball events, the 2017 EuroLeague Final Four, the EuroBasket 2017's final stage and the 2024 FIBA Under-17 Basketball World Cup.

Recently, major volleyball event have been hosted, notably: the 2025 FIVB Women's Volleyball Nations League week 2 pool 4 and the 2026 Women's European Volleyball Championship preliminary and final rounds.

== Tenants ==
The Basketbol Süper Ligi (BSL) club Anadolu Efes hosted its home Turkish League and EuroLeague games at the Sinan Erdem Dome, from 2010 to 2012. The Turkish club Fenerbahçe İstanbul also hosted its home games at the arena, from 2010 and until the inauguration of its own arena, the Ülker Sports Arena. The Turkish club Beşiktaş İstanbul also used the arena to host its home games, during the 2015–16 season. Since the 2017/18 season, Anadolu Efes as well as Galatasaray play their games at Sinan Erdem Dome, following the closure of Abdi İpekçi Arena.

The senior men's Turkish national basketball team has also used the arena, since the year 2010.

== Major events hosted ==
Year	Tournament	Date
2010	FIBA World Championship	4–12 September
2011	WTA Tour Championships	25–30 October
2012	2012 Euroleague Final Four	11–13 May
2012	WTA Tour Championships	23–28 October
2012	FINA World Swimming Championships (25 m)	
2013	WTA Tour Championships	22–27 October
2017	2017 EuroLeague Final Four	
2017	EuroBasket 2017 knockout stage	
2026	2026 Women's European Volleyball Championship Final	6 September

Preceded by Saitama Super Arena; Saitama	FIBA World Cup; Final Venue; 2010	Succeeded by Palacio de Deportes; Madrid
Preceded by Palau Sant Jordi; Barcelona	EuroLeague; Final Four Venue; 2012	Succeeded by The O2 Arena; London
Preceded by Khalifa International Complex; Doha	WTA Finals; Venue; 2011–2013	Succeeded by Singapore Indoor Stadium; Singapore
Preceded by Dubai Sports Complex; Dubai	FINA World Swimming (25m); Venue; 2012	Succeeded by Hamad Aquatic Centre; Doha
Preceded by Mercedes-Benz Arena; Berlin	EuroLeague; Final Four Venue; 2017	Succeeded by Kombank Arena; Belgrade
Preceded by Stade Pierre-Mauroy; Lille	FIBA EuroBasket; Final Venue; 2017	Succeeded by Mercedes-Benz Arena; Berlin
