= Sakarya Büyükşehir Belediyesi S.K. =

Sakarya Büyüksehir Basketbol
- Leagues: TBL
- Founded: 2013; 12 years ago
- Dissolved: 2019; 6 years ago
- Arena: Sakarya Sports Hall
- Capacity: 5,000
- Location: Sakarya, Turkey
- President: Orhan Bayraktar
- Head coach: Selçuk Ernak
- 2019 position: Basketbol Süper Ligi, 15th of 15 (Relegated)
- Website: Link
| Home | Away |

Sakarya Büyükşehir Belediyesi Spor Kulübü, more commonly known as Sakarya BB was a Turkish professional basketball club based in Sakarya which played two seasons in the Turkish Basketball Super League (TBL). The team was founded and sponsored by Sakarya Metropolitan Municipality in 2013. Their home arena was Sakarya Sports Hall with a capacity of 5,000 seats.

In the 2016–17 season, Sakarya were promoted to the first tier Basketbol Süper Ligi for the first time in club history. In the 2017–18 season, they would make their European debut as they qualified for the Basketball Champions League qualification rounds. However, at the end of 2018–19 season, they finished in last place of the Basketbol Süper Ligi and were relegated to Turkish Basketball First League.

== Arenas ==
- Sakarya Atatürk Sports Hall (2013–2017)
- Sakarya Sports Hall (2017–present)

== Season by season ==
| Season | Tier | League | Pos. | Turkish Cup | European competition | |
|---|---|---|---|---|---|---|
| 2013–14 | 2 | TB2L | 3rd | | | |
| 2014–15 | 2 | TB2L | 3rd | | | |
| 2015–16 | 2 | TBL | 4th | | | |
| 2016–17 | 2 | TBL | 1st | | | |
| 2017–18 | 1 | BSL | 8th | Quarterfinalist | | |
| 2018–19 | 1 | BSL | 15th | | 3 Champions League | QR3 |
| 2018–19 | 1 | BSL | 15th | | 4 FIBA Europe Cup | RS |

== European record ==
| Season | Competition | Round | Club | Home | Away | Advanced |
|---|---|---|---|---|---|---|
| 2018–19 | Basketball Champions League | QR3 | (Switzerland) Fribourg Olympic | 87–85 | 76–52 | No, –22 |
| 2018–19 | FIBA Europe Cup | RS | (Netherlands) ZZ Leiden | 56–69 | 99–97 | No, 3rd |
| 2018–19 | FIBA Europe Cup | RS | (Germany) s.Oliver Würzburg | 80–60 | 69–97 | No, 3rd |
| 2018–19 | FIBA Europe Cup | RS | (Romania) Oradea | 84–68 | 84–84 | No, 3rd |

== Notable players ==
Note: Flags indicate national team eligibility at FIBA-sanctioned events. Players may hold other non-FIBA nationalities not displayed.

Criteria

To appear in this section a player must have either:

- Set a club record or won an individual award while at the club
- Played at least one official international match for their national team at any time
- Played at least one official NBA match at any time.

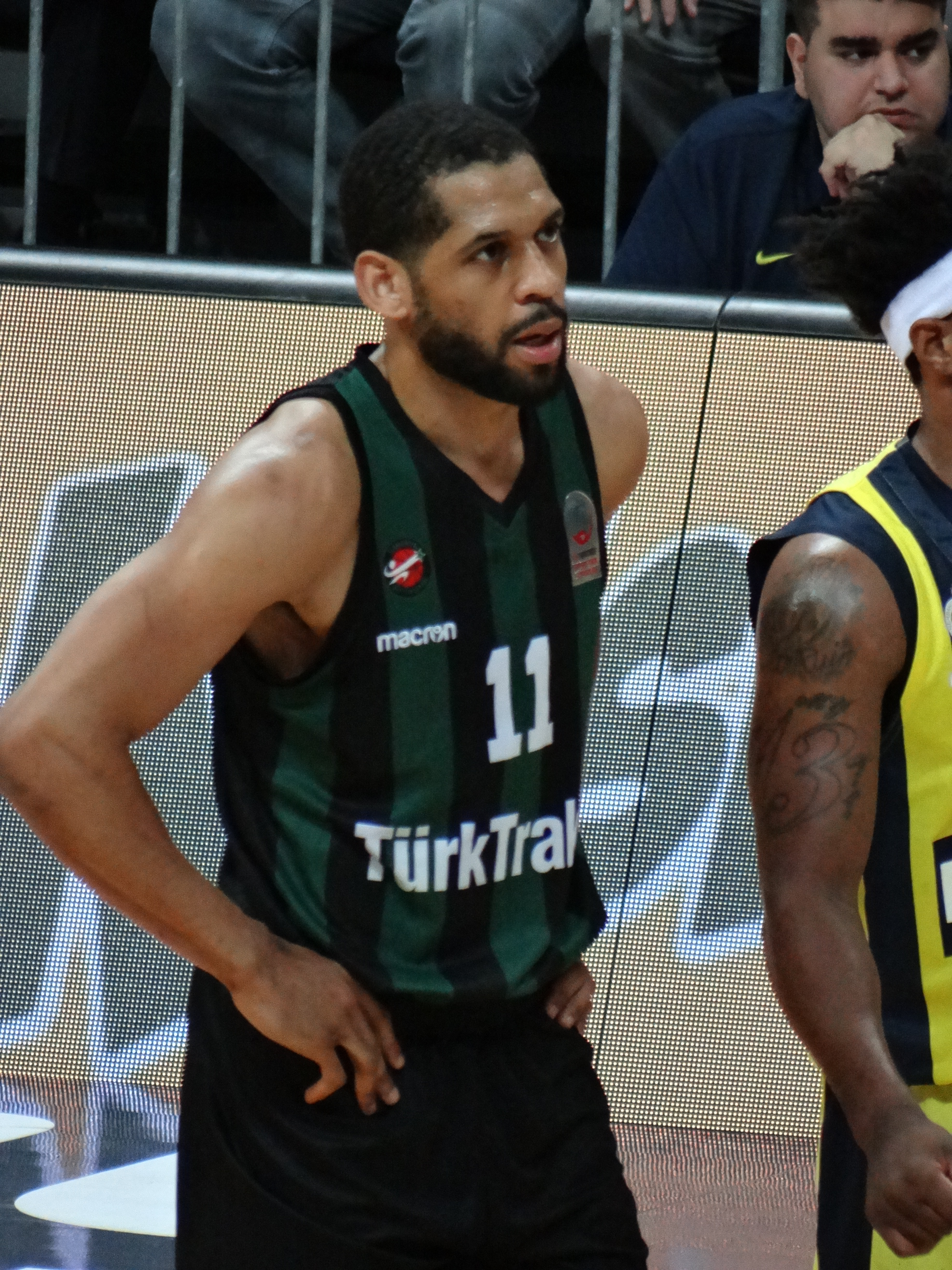
C. J. Harris

- (Turkey) Kerem Gönlüm
- (Turkey) Metecan Birsen
- (France) Moustapha Fall
- (Puerto Rico) Gian Clavell
- (United States) Toney Douglas
- (United States) C. J. Harris
- (Republic of the Congo) Junior Etou

== Head coaches ==
- (Turkey) Okan Çevik (2015–2016)
- (Turkey) Selçuk Ernak (2016–present)
