= National reactions to the 2010 Gaza flotilla raid =

Israel Palestine conflict

National reactions to the Gaza flotilla raid on 31 May 2010 ranged from support to strong condemnation of Israel. Those supporting Israel generally also expressed concern for the loss of life and injuries to civilians. Criticism included the death and injuries of civilians, the disproportionate response, and the execution of the raid.

== Israel ==
Israeli Prime Minister Benjamin Netanyahu, who was in Canada during the incident, expressed regret for the loss of life, and said that the event represents a clear case of self-defense of the IDF soldiers, he expressed his "full backing" for the military raid and cancelled a scheduled trip to the United States to meet with U.S. President Barack Obama. A spokesman for the Prime Minister was quoted as saying that Netanyahu, "feels he has to be home to deal with this". he told a press conference that had Israel not stopped the flotilla from breaking the blockade and entering the Gaza Strip illegally, hundreds of more flotillas would arrive carrying weapons. He stood his ground defending the raid and said Israel will never apologize for the incident. In an address to the country, on 2 June he said "Israel faces hypocrisy and a biased rush to judgment." He further noted that in five of the six vessels in the flotilla, the boarding procedure ended without casualties. "The only difference was with one ship, where extremist Islamic activists, supporters of terrorism, waited for our troops on the deck with axes and knives."

After the boarding took place, Deputy Foreign Minister Danny Ayalon said that the flotilla of ships "was an armada of hate and violence". He added that the flotilla attempt to reach Gaza was "a premeditated and outrageous provocation" and claimed that its organizers had ties not only to Hamas, but also to global Jihad, and al Qaida.

Israeli Foreign Minister Avigdor Lieberman called the international community "two faced" and said Israel was being condemned for its military acts of defense. Lieberman was said to have been "reminding" the UN Secretary General that in the past month alone over 500 people were killed in various incidents in Thailand, Afghanistan, Pakistan, Iraq and India, which had allegedly been "ignored" while Israel was being condemned for its "unmistakably defensive actions". Israel later rescinded its criticism of India.

Opposition leader Tzipi Livni said that the coalition and the opposition are united in support of the defense forces, and that she is ready to assist the government in the political and explanatory aspects of the flotilla incident. She, however, disagreed with what she considered Netanyahu's lack of policy: "The world is certainly hypocritical, but that doesn't absolve us from forming a policy. This is more than an isolated incident. Anything that happened when Israel had a different standing in world opinion would have had a different result. Now, any isolated incident becomes a global drama, and it's becoming worse. We are reaching the stage when Israel's ability to defend itself will no longer exist." She said the lack of policy in the aftermath of the incident would jeopardize Israel's legitimacy and backing from the international community, which she says for years had insisted on not recognizing Hamas until it recognizes Israel and accepts past agreements, and had accepted the closure of Gaza while "it was clear that Israel wanted an agreement with pragmatic forces, with the legitimate Palestinian government." She also said that IDF soldiers acted appropriately, and supports setting up an internal investigation committee with the United States.

Ambassador to the U.K., Ron Prosor, said: "It's obvious – and I won't beat around the bush on this – that this wasn't successful and I think it clearly took up an issue that should have been solved differently." [However, the] other side [behaved] appallingly. [Israel was in a] war situation with terrorists. The loss of life was tragic and I'm not just saying that. When you look at the footage ... it's obvious that the reaction is self—defence to try and save your life."

The Israeli high court rejected a petition seeking to overrule Attorney-General Yehuda Weinstein's decision to halt the police investigation into the attack. On 3 June, the Israeli Supreme Court ruled that the soldiers responded in self-defense, and that the Gaza blockade and the raid of the ships were legal.

Minister of Strategic Affairs Moshe Ya'alon, a former IDF chief of staff, announced that the operation was a failure and instead of distributing citations Israel was busy trying to understand why basic operating protocol was not implemented.

== Turkey ==
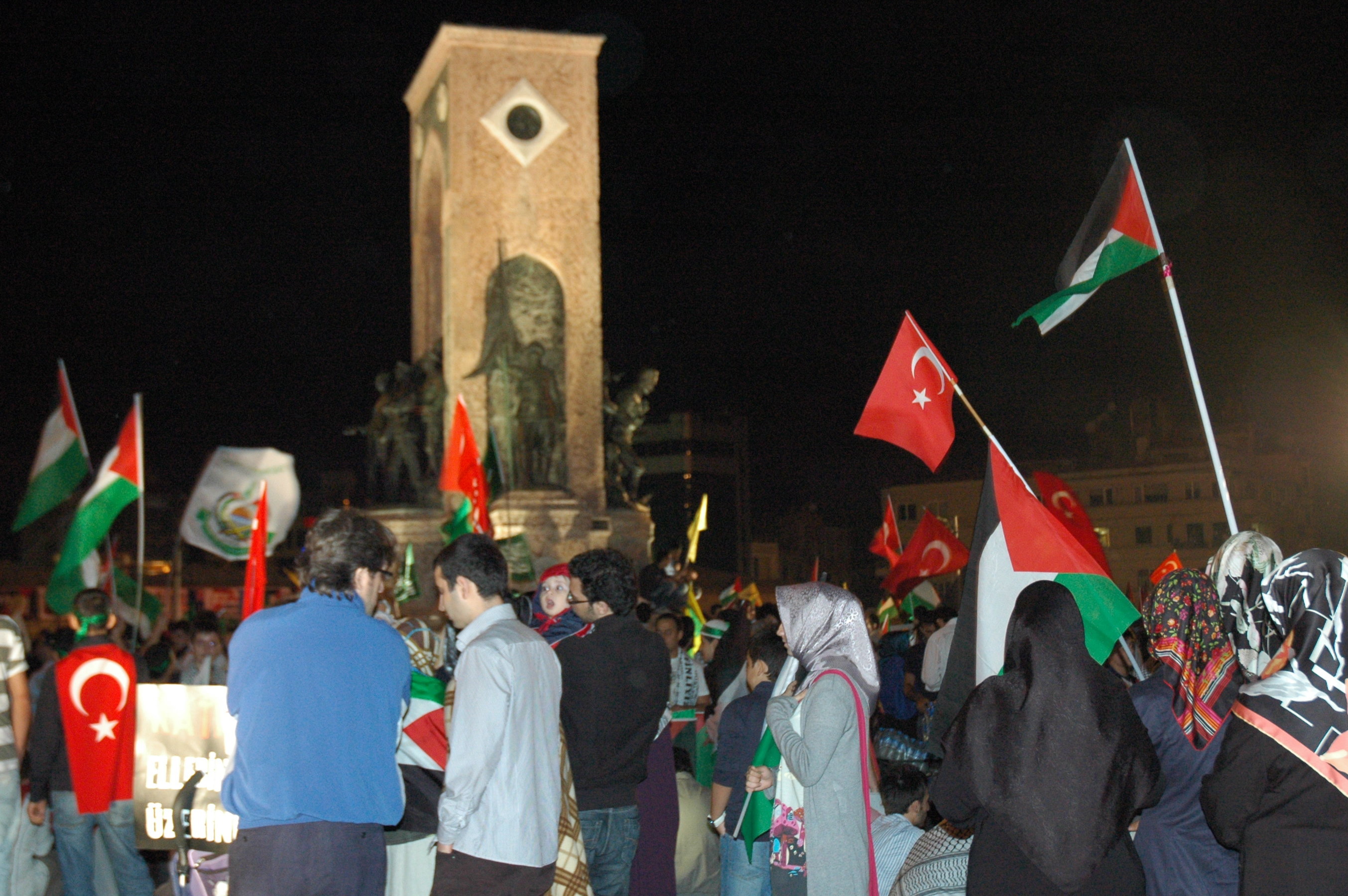
Welcoming activists from Gaza in Istanbul's Taksim Square, on 2 June 2010 following the Gaza flotilla raid.

Turkish Deputy Prime Minister, Bülent Arınç said "In the name of the Turkish people and of our government, we strongly condemn these attacks," and he announced that Turkey canceled an U-19 football game against Israel. He added that no one should think that Turkey would declare war on Israel.

Prime Minister Recep Tayyip Erdoğan said that the raid was "state terror" and decided to return from a state visit to Chile. Erdoğan spoke to the AKP Group at the Turkish Parliament, he said "Turkey's friendship is as strong as its animosity." He also strongly rebuked Israel's action saying even pirates had a code of conduct. Erdoğan upped the ante, in a speech to legislators saying Israel should be "punished" for its "bloody massacre" amid a warning that no one should test Turkey's patience. He said "It is no longer possible to cover up or ignore Israel's lawlessness. The international community must from now on say 'enough is enough'. Dry statements of condemnation are not enough ... There should be results." He said the Israeli action was an attack "on international law, [and] the conscience of humanity and world peace". He even said that Israel acts as it does because it has powerful friends. He called for Israel to lift the "inhuman siege" of the Gaza Strip, which he referred to as an "open-air prison", and announced that he was considering sending the Turkish Navy to escort any future flotillas or to visit Gaza himself, in order to break the blockade. He also urged the international community to impose sanctions on Israel.

President Abdullah Gül said, "From now on, Turkish-Israeli ties will never be the same. This incident has left an irreparable and deep scar." He also said, "Turkey will never forgive this attack." Gül compared Israel's actions to those of al-Qaeda, and demanded that Israel apologize and pay compensation, and also urged Israel to thoroughly investigate the incident and lift the blockade of Gaza.

A Turkish Foreign Ministry statement condemned Israel, and the foreign ministry was reported to have summoned the Israeli ambassador to lodge a protest. Turkey recalled its ambassador from Israel. Foreign Minister, Ahmet Davutoğlu told the UN Security Council that Israel has "lost all legitimacy" as a result of the raid. He called those who died "martyrs". He said, "It is no longer possible to cover up or ignore Israel's lawlessness. It is time for the international community to say 'enough is enough'." He also said that Turkey was ready to normalise ties if the blockade on Gaza was lifted because "it was time calm replaces anger." That, in turn, was accompanied with statement saying the injured would stay in Tel Aviv hospital under the care of a Turkish doctor, "We will not leave them (the wounded) to the mercy of anyone." The Parliament of Turkey unanimously adopted a resolution calling for the United Nations Security Council to impose sanctions on Israel, and called the attack a "blatant violation of the UN Charter and international law".

İlker Başbuğ, Chief of the Turkish Armed Forces held a phone conversation with Gabi Ashkenazi, the Israeli Chief of Staff and called the raid unacceptable and indicated such actions could hold very serious consequences. Turkey said that all future aid vessels would be escorted by the Turkish Navy.

Leaders of opposition parties in Turkey also condemned the raid on Turkish ships. The leader of MHP, Devlet Bahçeli, said the attack was an aggression that should be never accepted by the Turkish nation.

Kemal Kılıçdaroğlu, chairman of the Republican People's Party (CHP), supported Turkish government's efforts for a UN Security Council resolution to condemn Israeli government and he said "We said we have given our support to the prime minister, as he said the attacks would not be left without a response. We said the CHP would support solutions which are concordant with our national interests." However, he also criticized the Turkish government and told Turkish television, "The European Union and the United States consider Hamas a terror organization. We must be careful." He demanded that the government release communications with Israel prior to the incident, suggesting it allowed the flotilla to proceed despite knowing that violence was likely. Erdogan dismissed Kılıçdaroğlu as an Israeli "advocate" after Kılıçdaroğlu recited Torah's the eighth commandment, which says 'Do not steal' and the ninth commandment says 'Do not lie'.

== Arab League ==
Arab League called an emergency meeting on 1 June to discuss what it called Israel's "terrorist act" against the flotilla. Secretary General of the Arab League, Amr Moussa, stated, "we condemn this crime, taken against a humanitarian mission and people. They were trying to help people. They were not on a military mission. Everyone should condemn this."

- Palestinian Authority president, and Chairman of the Palestine Liberation Organisation (PLO) since 11 November 2004, Mahmoud Abbas said, "Israel has committed a massacre," and declared a three-day state of mourning. Palestinian government official Mustafa Barghouti stated that Israel's actions would lead to the international boycott growing in strength. Salam Fayyad said "Israel went beyond all that could be expected. / This [attack] is a transgression against all international covenants and norms and it must be confronted by all international forums."
  - Hamas spokesman Sami Abu Zuhri said, "We call on all Arabs and Muslims to rise up in front of Zionist embassies across the whole world."
- Algeria condemned "in the strongest terms" the Israeli onslaught against the fleet of international aid for Gaza and requested a "strong and unanimous" response from the international community.
- The government of Bahrain stated that it "strongly condemns the Israeli navy's barbaric attack on the aid flotilla in international waters, an attack which caused the deaths of many innocent victims. The Israeli use of force against civilians, including women, children and elders from several countries who sought to provide humanitarian aid to those people besieged in the Gaza Strip, must be condemned, is unacceptable, and is contrary to the basic laws and standards governing international waters."
- The Consulate of The Comoros in Istanbul condemned the raid.
- At the UN Human Rights Council, Mohammed Siad Doualeh of Djibouti expressed deep concern over the killings
- (Egypt) The Egyptian President Hosni Mubarak denounced Israel's use of "excessive and unjustified force" while the Foreign Ministry summoned the Israeli ambassador to express its condemnation. The Egyptian President also ordered the opening of the Egyptian border to Gaza on Tuesday to allow humanitarian and medical aid into the Gaza Strip
- (Iraq) An Iraqi government official, MP Khairallah al-Basri (a member of current premier Nouri al-Maliki's State of Law Coalition), condemned the attack and described it as a "new humanitarian disaster", as well as, "a violation of human rights and a breach of international standards and norms".
- The Jordanian government called the raid a "heinous crime". Minister of Communication and Media Affairs Nabil al-Sharif called the Israeli action an "ugly, unacceptable crime" and said that Jordan held Israel "completely accountable and responsible for any harm caused to the Jordanians on board".
- Kuwait National Assembly Speaker Jassem Mohammad Al-Kharafi condemned the "heinous" Israeli attack on the convoy. He urged the United Nations to ensure the safety of those on board the convoy and to lift the blockade of Gaza. The Kuwaiti parliament has called an emergency session to discuss the attack.
- Saad Hariri, the Prime Minister of Lebanon, said, "The Israeli attack on the aid convoy is a dangerous and crazy step that will exacerbate tensions in the region. Lebanon firmly denounces this attack and calls on the international community, notably major powers ... to take action in order to end this continued violation of human rights and threat to international peace."
  - The Lebanese opposition party and paramilitary group Hezbollah issued a statement denouncing the "horrible terrorist crime committed by the Zionist occupation forces against innocent civilians on a human[e] mission to express solidarity with the Palestinians besieged in the Gaza strip". Adding that this was apparently proof of the "inherent evil in Zionists which targets all human beings regardless of their confession and race as long as they're ready to stand by righteousness in the face of the persistent Zionist terrorism against the Palestinians". And, "this atrocious crime is the materialization of the inherent force of tyranny which has escalated in the past years due to the unlimited Western support to the Zionist scheme, and due to the wrong political bargaining of some Arab regimes."
- Mauritania Ministry of Foreign Affairs issued a statement "strongly" condemning the Israeli attack, calling it a "cowardly act, a clear defiance to the international community and the continuing rejection of Israel to peace and coexistence". It urged the international community "to intervene to clarify this hideous crime, end Israel occupation in all Arab territories and stop the blockade on Gaza".
- Moroccan Foreign Minister Taieb Fassi Fihri stated, "the Kingdom of Morocco strongly denounces the disgraceful attack of Israel against the humanitarian convoy en route to Gaza."
- Oman stated that the attack "violates international law".
- Qatari Emir Sheikh Hamad bin Khalifa Al-Thani condemned Israel's deadly raid against a Gaza-bound aid flotilla, branding it an "act of piracy". At the Doha Forum 2010, he stated "The crime perpetrated this morning against civilians supporting the Palestinians reminds us of the unjust siege, the open, bleeding wound in the Strip. And all those who speak for freedom, justice and democracy must do something now to break the siege imposed on the Gaza Strip so that the blood of these free people will not go in vain. This is a message to the Arab countries that now face the moment of truth." He said the blockade was imposed because "the people of Gaza practised their democratic right in the elections." The Prime Minister and Foreign Minister, Sheikh Hamad bin Jassem bin Jabr Al Thani, lauded the call by the Emir and reiterated Qatar's condemnation of the Israeli assault. He called the attack a premeditated assault on innocent people and a flagrant breach of international law and conventions. Asking "who would pay for the blood of those who were killed yesterday", while holding the international community responsible for tolerating such "barbaric practices" that could have grave repercussions for the region. He also expressed Qatar's solidarity with Turkey and stand supporting justice, though he expressed doubt over whether the Arab peace initiative would now go ahead with indirect and direct negotiations after "Israel was opposing peace."

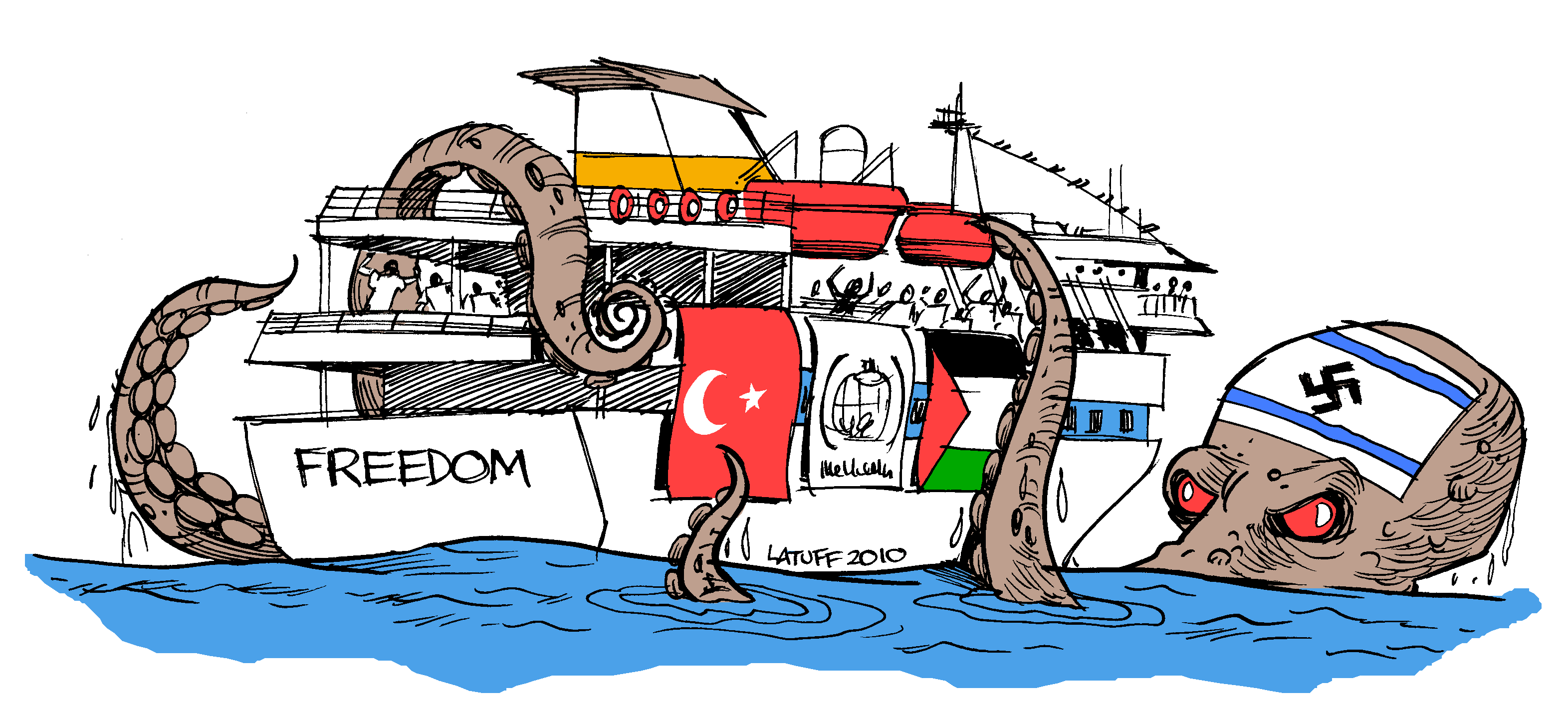
A cartoon by Carlos Latuff depicting the Gaza flotilla raid. It was published in Arab News.

- (Saudi Arabia) Saudi Arabian King Abdullah bin Abdulaziz Al Saud chaired a Saudi Cabinet session that "denounced and condemned the massacre committed" and "described the attack as aggressive and reflects Israel's inhuman practices, flagrant defiance of the whole world and international law, insistence to starve the Palestinian people and prevent all kinds of humanitarian relief, and indulgence in killing innocent people".
- The Sudanese Ministry of Foreign Affairs issued a statement saying the "Sudan government, strongly condemning the repeated Israeli crimes, calls on the international community, including governments, organizations and peoples, to come together, more than [at] any time before, against the state of the Zionist enemy and to show the real power of law to prevent Israel from what is committing of crimes against humanity and genocide against the Palestinian people". The National Assembly of Sudan issued a statement saying "the parliament condemns the Israeli attack against international activists who were trying to deliver food for the civilians in Gaza," adding "the attack constitutes a major crime against civilians and should be condemned". The Sudanese Ministry of Foreign Affairs issued a statement on behalf of the government, saying it was "strongly condemning the repeated Israeli crimes" and "calls on the international community, including governments, organizations and peoples, to come together, more than any time before" to show "the real power of law" to stop the Israeli regime from committing what it described as "crimes against humanity and genocide against the Palestinian people". It called on the international community to unite to end Israel's "enjoy[ment of] protection and support of influential countries" and what it sees as "exposed silence on the part of the United Nations".
- (Syria) Syrian Foreign Ministry issued a statement condemning Israeli assault on the Gaza-bound international aid flotilla and called it a "bloody and heinous piracy crime committed by Israel in the Mediterranean international water". The Syrian government has called a meeting of the Arab League to discuss the attack.
- The Foreign Affairs Ministry of Tunisia issued a statement saying "While reiterating its condemnation of all forms of collective punishment, Tunisia urges the international community, particularly influential forces to immediately intervene to lift the unjust blockade imposed on the Palestinian people in Gaza and to put an end to their suffering." Tunisia added that it was "reaffirm[ing] its rejection of these hostile practices that are an affront to the international community and a violation of agreements and international and humanitarian resolutions, which threaten to further complicate the situation in the region and undermine any hope of peace".
- United Arab Emirates condemned Israel's violent attack on the Freedom Flotilla. Shaikh Abdullah said, "the attack on civilians traversing across the sea to deliver aid to the Palestinian people strongly defied international laws" and called for a United Nations led investigation.
- The Parliament of Yemen strongly condemned the Israeli attack and demanded for "an Islamic army to encounter the Israeli arrogance".

In a joint-statement, Syrian President Bashar al—Assad and Lebanese Prime Minister Saad Hariri "condemn[ed] the heinous crime committed by Israel through the brutal attacks on unarmed civilians on board the Freedom Flotilla". While warning that Israel's "violations of basic humanitarian norms and international laws threatens to plunge the Middle East into a war which will not only affect the region". After reconfirming bonds with Turkey and harshly criticizing the Israeli siege, al-Assad joint Erdogan in proposing a new initiative aimed at having the blockade on Gaza lifted "once and for all". His plan involved "a number of political ideas for regional and international activity aimed at lifting the siege". Qatar is slated to take part in the initiative's implementation. At the conference, Erdogan urged Arab nations to unite and step-up efforts to end Israel's blockade on the Gaza Strip. He said "Are we going to remain silent over the murder of nine people? We can't turn a blind eye to this banditry in international waters. This can't continue as it is. Peace and stability will not come to the region as long as the blockade of Gaza persists. Painful experience has made it clear that no [regional] country will fully achieve prosperity and security as long as the Palestinian-Israeli conflict remains unresolved."

== Africa ==
- African Union condemned Israel for the killings.
- The representative of Gabon at the UN Security Council expressed his shock at the events. He further called upon Israel to lift the blockade of Gaza, and called all parties to refrain from violence.
- (Kenya) The Kenyan government issued a statement condemning the killing of nine activists as "grossly callous and a brazen violation of international law".
- The government of the Sahrawi Arab Democratic Republic condemned "in the strongest terms the abject and shameful attack of the Israeli army against the Flotilla of Freedom. By carrying out the bombing of a fleet carrying humanitarian aid to the people of Gaza, deprived of everything including medication, Israel commits an unforgivable act contrary to international law and the Universal Declaration of Human Rights, which guarantees the protection of citizens around the world," the statement added.
- South Africa Foreign Ministry issued a statement "strongly condemning all military aggression by Israel against innocent civilians, including those in the occupied West Bank and Gaza". On 3 June, South Africa recalled its ambassador from Israel, and the Israeli ambassador was summoned to the Foreign Ministry for a reprimand.

== Americas ==
Organization of American States

The Secretary General of the Organization of American States said "Nothing can justify excessive use of military force to attack, with serious loss of human lives, to a disarmed civil convoy." Also he warned of a violence increase risk in the Middle East, Mr. José Miguel Insulza asked "to avoid actions which can means to increase the situation that, once again, threatens seriously the peace process in the Middle East".

- Argentina's Foreign Affairs Ministry (Cancillería) issued a statement condemning the attack by Israeli forces, called for a full investigation and deeply regretted the loss of human lives. It also asked for an immediate stop to acts of violence in the area, and the lifting of the blockade.
- Bolivia Ministry of Foreign Affairs issued a statement calling the attack "atrocious", adding that the actions were a flagrant violation of international law and called for an investigation.
- Brazil's Ministry of External Relations issued a statement strongly condemning the Israeli action, calling for an independent investigation and the end of the blockade of the Gaza Strip. Brazil also expressed deep concern over the well-being of one of its citizens, Iara Lee, that was on board the flotilla. They further said that they had instructed the Permanent Representative of Brazil to the United Nations to fully support an emergency meeting of the United Nations Security Council to discuss the Israeli military action, and that the Ambassador of Israel in Brasília had been summoned to explain the events.
- The Canadian prime minister's office released a statement saying it "deeply regrets" the loss of life in the Israeli raid on an aid flotilla sailing to the blockaded Gaza Strip and that they "... are currently looking for more information in order to shed light on what exactly happened". The Edmonton Journal asserted its view that Canada's "cautious" approach was the right one as "tragedies involving loss of life in the Middle East invariably provoke reflexive responses from opposing camps". This was despite the arrest of Canadian Kevin Neish.
- The Chilean Foreign Ministry said in a statement, "Chile condemns the use of the forces in any form." Chilean Senator Alejandro Navarro, who was scheduled to be aboard the Gaza aid convoy, denounced the attack as "cowardly and disproportionate against unarmed civilians". He further stated that Chile "condemns Israel and this event will have multilateral consequences because it set a serious precedent".
- Ecuador President Rafael Correa said he recalled his ambassador to Israel for consultations after which the Ecuadorian Foreign Ministry said the ambassador would leave Tel Aviv immediately "as an act of protest against the attack which left civilians killed and injured".
- Mexico Secretariat of Foreign Affairs issued a statement "strongly condemning the Israeli attack on civilian vessels in international waters carrying humanitarian aid". It called for a full investigation.
- (Nicaragua) The Nicaraguan government called the Israeli actions "a clear violation of humanitarian and international law", and suspended diplomatic ties with Israel in protest of the raid.
- Paraguay Foreign Affairs Ministry issued a statement "condemning" and "strongly rejecting" the Israeli attack on the convoy and supported the United Nations' call for a full investigation.
- Peruvian Foreign Affairs Ministry issued a statement condemning Israeli violent attack on the human assistance convoy. Peru disapproves the use of military force based on international rights principles and calls for a full investigation. Peruvian government exhorts to restore dialogue and negotiation in order to reach permanent peace agreements and made an urgent call to the Government of Israel to allow the free flow of humanitarian aid to the people in Gaza Strip
- The United States Secretary of State Hillary Clinton said, "United States supports the United Nations Security Council's condemnation of the acts leading to this tragedy, and we urge Israel to permit full consular access to the individuals involved, and to allow the countries concerned to retrieve their deceased and wounded immediately. We support in the strongest terms the Security Council's call for a prompt, impartial, credible, and transparent investigation." A White House spokesman cautiously said that the United States "deeply regrets the loss of life and injuries sustained, and is currently working to understand the circumstances surrounding this tragedy". President Barack Obama told his counterpart Benjamin Netanyahu that he deeply regretted the loss of life in the Israeli raid urged him to quickly get to the bottom of the incident. The White House summarized the President's conversation saying "The president expressed deep regret at the loss of life in today's incident, and concern for the wounded." In the Senate, Majority Leader Harry Reid and Minority Leader Mitch McConnell co-authored a letter signed by 85 other senators arguing for the legality of the blockade and the raid and calling on the President to support Israel. Rep. Anthony Weiner of the U.S. congress criticized the flotilla, saying that it had was supported "by some of the worst enemies of peace in that region, and some of the worst enemies, quite literally, not only of Israel, but of the United States as well. And I mean Turkey, Iran, Hamas. These are not entities that were looking for some peaceful resolution here." "The complicity of Turkey in launching a flotilla to challenge the blockade in Gaza, the ensuing violence that occurred, the grievous loss of life is deeply troubling to those of us who have supported the U.S.-Turkish alliance in the past," Rep. Mike Pence said on the House floor. "Turkey needs to decide whether its present course is in its long-term interests, but America will stand with Israel." In an interview with Charlie Rose, Vice President Joe Biden defended Israel's decision to intercept the pro-Palestinian flotilla bringing humanitarian aid to the coastal territory, but did not defend the Israel Navy raid itself. He stated, "you can argue whether Israel should have dropped people onto that ship or not[, but Israel] has a right to know whether or not arms are being smuggled in." Mike Hammer, a spokesperson for the National Security Council, said: "The current arrangements are unsustainable and must be changed." The city of San Francisco's Board of Supervisors was considering a non-binding resolution introduced John Avalos and Sophie Maxwell calling for "condemning the Israel Defense Forces' military attack on the Freedom Flotilla", while also calling on the US Congress and Obama to continue working to bring peace and security to the Gaza region.
- Uruguay's Foreign Affairs Ministry condemned the Israeli navy's action, expressed sorrow for the loss of life and demanded a "quick independent investigation and called on the Israeli government for full cooperation". The ministry has also expressed its solidarity with the families of the victims and is asking for the siege on Gaza to end.
- (Venezuela) Venezuelan President Hugo Chavez condemned Israel's "attack on peace activists". He called the attack "an act of war undertaken by the Israeli army against defenseless civilians" who were trying to break through Israel's "criminal blockade". At a rally, Chavez described Israel as "cursed terrorist and murderous state" and further alleged "Israel is financing the Venezuelan opposition. There are even groups of Israeli terrorists, of the Mossad, who are after me trying to kill me."

Non-OAS members

- The Cuban Ministry of Foreign Affairs condemned the Israeli action, calling it a "criminal attack" and expressed its "most energetic condemnation". Cuba calls for the lifting of the Gaza blockade and reaffirms its solidarity with the Palestinian people. Former Cuban President Fidel Castro condemned Israel's attack on the Freedom Flotilla as "Nazi fascist fury". Adding that the Israeli commandos who boarded the ships fired "frenetically" at the aid workers. he then asked "Is it possible [for Obama to be re-elected] without the Pentagon of ... Israel ... use nuclear weapons against Iran?"

== Asia ==
- Bangladesh's Ministry of Foreign Affairs stated, "Bangladesh is shocked and saddened at the unwarranted attack on unarmed civilians on board the Mavi Marmara on 31 May 2010, and the resultant loss of lives." The Ministry also said that Bangladesh expresses its profound condolences and sincerest sympathy to the bereaved families, and joins in prayer for the eternal peace of the departed souls. Bangladesh also called for collective international action to end the siege immediately and to allow the people of Palestine to return to normal life.
- Brunei Foreign Minister Pengiran Muda Mohamed Bolkiah condemn the recent Israeli raid on Gaza-bound Turkish aid ships. In a joint statement with other ministers of the second Asean-Gulf Cooperation Council (Asean-GCC), he condemn the act of violence in international waters and expressed condolences to the victims of the raid and expressed solidarity with the people and government of Turkey and other countries. The ministers also urged the immediate release of those who are still held hostage by the Israeli authorities and called for the removal of the Israeli blockade in accordance with the relevant UN Security Council resolutions, in particular United Nations Security Council Resolution 1860. With the recent raid, Israel has once again created additional hurdles to the Middle East peace process which is currently entering a critical phase with the launch of "proximity talks". The ministers agreed there is a need for international cooperation to ensure that Israel is held accountable for its action in accordance with international law and urged the United Nations to conduct a thorough investigation of the Israeli attack in order to ensure its accountability.
- China Foreign Ministry spokesman Ma Zhaoxu condemned Israel's raid on the international convoy and urged Israel to seriously implement UN Security Council resolutions and improve the humanitarian situation in Gaza.
- India's Ministry of External Affairs released a statement strongly condemning the attack by Israeli forces. "India deplores the tragic loss of life and the reports of killings and injuries to people on the boats carrying supplies for Gaza. There can be no justification for such indiscriminate use of force, which we condemn. We extend our sympathies to the families of the dead and wounded. It is our firm conviction that lasting peace and security in the region can be achieved only through peaceful dialogue and not through use of force."
- (Indonesia) Indonesian president Susilo Bambang Yudhoyono condemned Israeli action. Foreign Minister Marty Natalegawa also condemned the action and said that the Israeli blockade in Gaza is a violation of international law.
- Iran Supreme Leader of the Islamic Revolution Ayatollah Sayyid Ali Khamenei condemned Israeli actions, and said is Israel is more brutal than Fascists. Iran president Mahmoud Ahmedinejad said that the incident was an "inhuman action of the Zionist regime against the Palestinian people" and that it would bring the regime "closer than ever to its end". The Iranian government has called for a boycott of Israel. Iran's Supreme National Security Council (SNSC) Secretary Saeed Jalili underlined the necessity for coordination among regional and Islamic states to confront the Zionist regime of Israel effectively. Iran's Foreign Ministry condemned the raid, saying "the incident once again revealed the criminal and war-mongering nature of the Zionist regime." Iran also called on the UN Security Council and the OIC to take swift punitive action against Israel. At an Asian security summit in Istanbul, Turkey on 8 June 2010, Ahmadinejad stated that the raid "showed violence and hatred and war-mongering attitudes. The devilish sound of the uncultured Zionists was coming out from their deceit.... They were holding up the flag of the devil itself." He also claimed that the raid would accelerate the end of Israel, stating, "[The raid] has actually rung the final countdown for its existence. It shows that it has no room in the region and no one is ready to live alongside it. Actually, no country in the world recognizes it, and you know that the Zionist regime is the backbone of the dictatorial world order."
- Japan Ministry of Foreign Affairs issued a statement stating that it is "shocked at the report that people aboard boats carrying supplies to the Gaza Strip were victimized as a result of confrontation with Israel Defense Forces. We deeply deplore the casualties and the injuries of many people. Japan condemns the violent acts which caused this tragic incident." It also expressed deep condolences for the affected families and urged a full investigation into the matter.
- Malaysia Prime Minister Datuk Seri Najib Tun Razak stated, "in the name of the Malaysian government and the people strongly condemn this inhumane, brutal aggression by the Israeli regime on the flotilla which is bringing humanitarian aid to the beleaguered people of Gaza." He added "the whole world should condemn the action of this cruel regime," and "hoped the incident will result in a censure on Israel". Malaysia's government also urged Israel not to take any action that could harm people aboard the Malaysian-funded MV Rachel Corrie, which would carry its citizens. Foreign Affairs Minister Anifah Aman said Israeli authorities should ensure a safe passage for the vessel to deliver its humanitarian cargo.
- The Maldives Ministry of Foreign Affairs released a statement expressing its great sadness at the incident and extending condolences to those affected. It condemned "in the strongest possible terms" the attack on civilians. The Maldives joint calls for an international enquiry and for those responsible to be held accountable. It also urged an immediate end to the blockade of Gaza.
- North Korea's Foreign Ministry condemned Israel for having "mercilessly killed or wounded dozens of civilians aboard the boats". It went on to call the attack a "crime against humanity perpetrated at the U.S. connivance and under its patronage and a blatant challenge to the Arabs including Palestinians and the Mideast peace process". The statement also "expresses full support and solidarity with the cause of the Palestinians and other Arab people[s]".
- Pakistan strongly condemned the Israeli action, calling it a cruel act and an open violation of international laws and ethics. Foreign Minister Shah Mahmood Qureshi stated, "Pakistan strongly condemns this incident. Our point of view was that there was no moral or legal reason for this attack." The Pakistani government also expressed deep concern over the well-being of Pakistanis and journalists on board and Pakistani missions are in touch with Arab countries of the region to get information about the status of the Pakistani nationals in the flotilla. President of Pakistan Asif Ali Zardari and Prime Minister of Pakistan Yousuf Raza Gilani strongly condemned the Israeli actions. They further said that the Government of Pakistan is exerting all its efforts to find out what had happened to the Pakistanis aboard the flotilla.
- The Government of South Korea downgraded Israeli President Shimon Peres' visit to 'working' status.
- The Government of Sri Lanka condemned the attacks saying it deeply regrets the loss of life and injuries resulting from this operation and condemned the indiscriminate use of force to prevent the carriage of supplies for people under occupation, and reiterates its conviction that sustainable peace and security in the region is achievable only through peaceful dialogue.
- Ministry of Foreign Affairs of Tajikistan condemned the Israeli attack on humanitarian aid convoy in international waters and called for international investigation of the incident.
- The foreign minister of Uzbekistan condemned the Israeli attack, and called on Israel to lift the blockage of Gaza.
- Vietnam cancelled scheduled visit of Israeli President Shimon Peres after the flotilla incident.

A summit at the Conference on Interaction and Confidence Building Measures in Asia a statement agreed to by 21 of the 22 participants at the conference (Israel being the 22nd) read "All member states, except one, expressed their grave concern and condemnation for the actions undertaken by the Israeli Defence Forces." In response Turkish President Abdullah Gul said the near-unanimous condemnation showed Israel was isolated and that it "will suffer the consequences for its mistake against Turkey".

== Europe ==
European Union

The President of the European Parliament, Jerzy Buzek, called it "an unjustified attack" and said, "it is a clear and unacceptable breach of international law, especially the fourth Geneva Convention. We demand that Israel explain its actions immediately, with the utmost transparency, and guarantee full accountability by co-operating with any full inquiry that is to be set up."

- Other members of the European Parliament described Israel's actions using words such as "obscene", "kidnapping", "revulsion", and even "terrorism". EU foreign affairs chief Catherine Ashton demanded Israeli authorities mount a "full inquiry" into the deaths on the flotilla. She also appealed for the opening of the border so humanitarian aid can get through. The ambassadors of the 27 EU members said "The EU condemns the use of violence that has produced a high number of victims among the members of the flotilla and demands an immediate, full and impartial inquiry into the events and the circumstances surrounding it. EU does not accept the continued policy of closure, it is unacceptable and politically counterproductive, we need to urgently achieve a durable solution to the situation in Gaza."
- Belgium's foreign minister, Steven Vanackere, called the use of Israeli force "disproportionate" and "invited the Israeli ambassador to explain how the events unfolded".
- The Bulgarian Foreign Ministry demanded the immediate release of two Bulgarian journalists travelling in the convoy. In addition, Bulgaria "slammed" the attack, saying "nothing can justify the violence that resulted in the killing of over 10 people on board one of the ships." It called for an investigation.
- In Cyprus, Israel's ambassador was summoned to the Foreign Ministry to explain the operation. Cyprus stated its belief that NGOs must be allowed to do their work freely and lawfully. Further, it called for the lifting of the blockade of Gaza.
- (Czech Republic) Czech foreign ministry spokesman Philip Kanda said Prague is not planning to issue separate statements to the event because it agrees with the observations of the EU foreign policy chief Catherine Ashton.
- Denmark's Minister of Foreign Affairs, Lene Espersen, described the confrontation as strongly worrying and has summoned the Israeli ambassador to the Ministry of Foreign Affairs to explain the incident.
- Estonia Minister for Foreign Affairs, Urmas Paet, condemned the incident and expressed their condolences to the loved ones of the casualties, and wished for a quick recovery for all the injured in the incident. Estonia also called for a thorough investigation of the incident, and expressed concern over the situation.
- Finland Foreign Minister, Alexander Stubb, expressed "shock" at the Israeli commando raid and called for an explanation of the incident and on the circumstances surrounding it. The Israeli Ambassador to Finland was called to the Foreign Ministry over the incident. He demanded Israel immediately re-open Gaza border crossings. He stated, "All violence directed at civilians must be condemned."

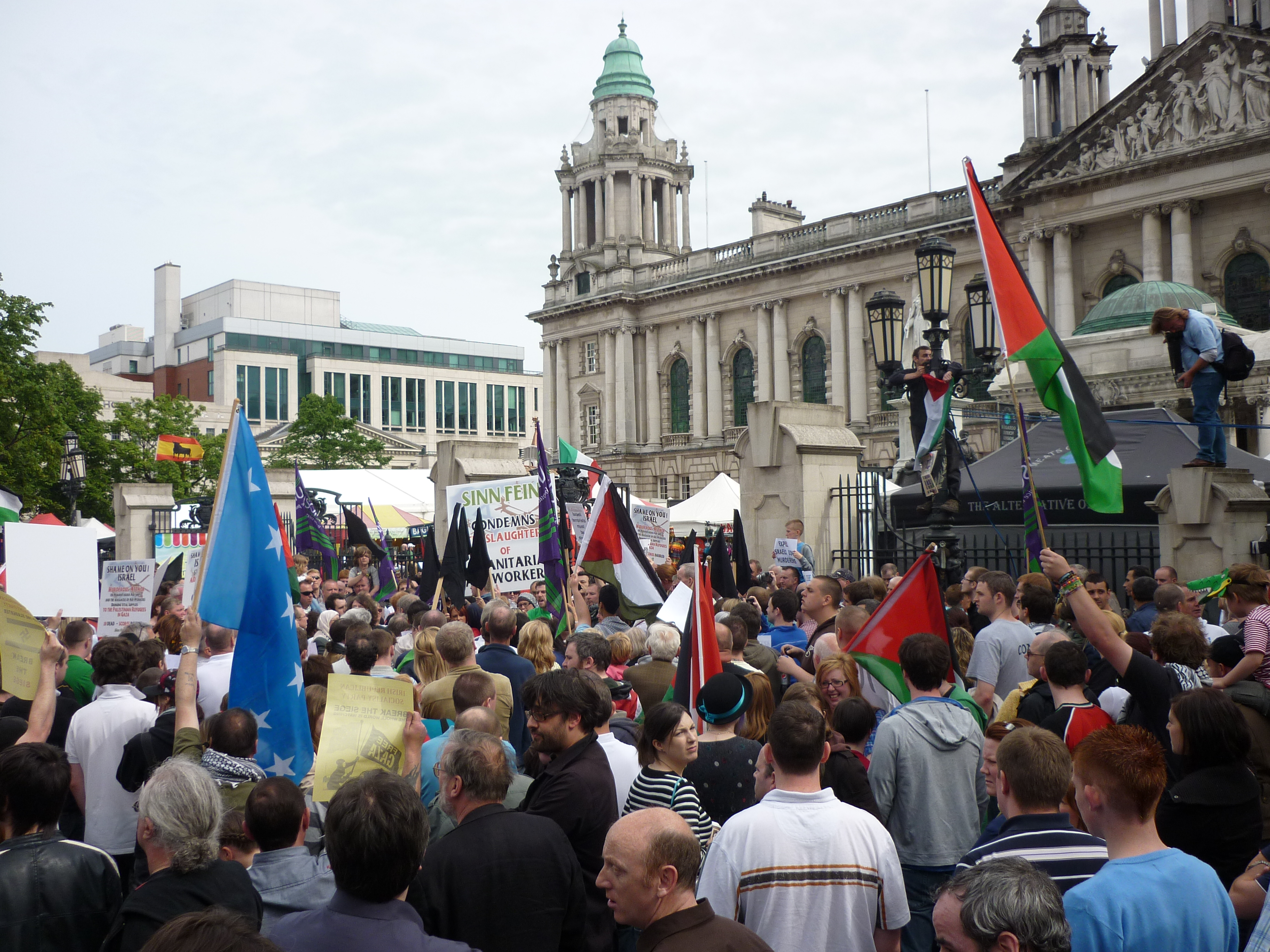
Demonstration in Belfast, Northern Ireland, on 31 May 2010 following the Gaza flotilla clash.

- (France) French President Nicolas Sarkozy condemned "the disproportionate use of force" against the flotilla. French Minister of Foreign and European Affairs Bernard Kouchner was "profoundly shocked" by the incident and demanded an inquiry. Kouchner stated, "Nothing can justify the use of violence such as this, which we condemn."
- (Germany) German Foreign Minister Guido Westerwelle voiced "deep concern" at reports of deaths, and called for a "full and transparent investigation". German Chancellor Angela Merkel's office said Israel's response to the ships was disproportionate, and reaffirmed the German government's demand for lifting the blockade of the Gaza strip.
- Greek Deputy Minister of Foreign Affairs Dimitris Droutsas summoned Ali Yahia, the Israeli Ambassador in Greece to inquire about the incident and convey the annoyance of the Greek government; he stressed, "nothing could justify the use of such violence." After the meeting he announced the discontinuation of the joint Greek-Israeli military exercise "Minoas 2010" as well as the postponement of the scheduled visit of the Israeli Air Force commander to Athens. In a press release issued later in the day the Foreign Ministry described the operation as "incomprehensible" and "utterly alarming" and the resulting loss of life as something that "cannot be justified by any claim whatsoever". The ministry's Crisis Handling Unit was activated to handle the ongoing situation.
- (Republic of Ireland) Irish Taoiseach Brian Cowen condemned the attacks, describing them as "very serious" and stated that he feels the blockade action was a violation of international law. He also stated that people are allowed to receive humanitarian assistance and that there should be an international investigation into the matter, describing the Israeli action as "disproportionate". On 1 June, Cowen told Dáil Éireann that there would be "serious consequences" if Irish citizens had come to any harm at the hands of Israel. Minister for Foreign Affairs Micheál Martin said he was "gravely concerned" about the reports of at least ten people being killed. No Irish citizens were harmed in the attack. The Israeli ambassador to Ireland, Zion Evrony, was summoned to the Irish Department of Foreign Affairs, after appearing on the radio programme Today with Pat Kenny where he explained "This is what soldiers do," and said it was "a sad result" that "a few [activists] were killed". Martin sent his condolences to the Turkish government on the loss of their citizens and to Turkish families who were affected by the tragedy. Martin was reported to be "furious" that Israel had kidnapped Irish citizens in international waters and brought them to Israel where they would then be deported. He said "They were essentially kidnapped from international waters, taken into Israel. And now they are being asked to sign a document almost confirming that they entered illegally. And we think that is unacceptable. I have said this to the Ambassador – it makes no sense. These people should be released unconditionally."
  - Two members of Dáil Éireann, Chris Andrews and Aengus Ó Snodaigh were refused access to the flotilla by the Cypriot authorities and had to abandon plans to travel with aid workers.
  - Sinn Féin's Martin McGuinness (also the Deputy First Minister of Northern Ireland) said "The Rachel Corrie contains only humanitarian aid for the people of Gaza. It is being crewed by Human Rights activists. The Israeli government know this to be the case. They know the Rachel Corrie and her cargo presents no threat to Israel. The human rights activists onboard the boat had made it clear they had no issue with UN officials checking the cargo before they proceeded to Gaza. The Rachel Corrie should have been allowed to proceed to Gaza without Israeli aggression. The decision of the Israeli government to board the Rachel Corrie and divert her away from Gaza is a completely unjustified and unacceptable use of force. This is an attack on an Irish flagged vessel and it demands a strong response by the Irish government. Sinn Féin have already made clear that part of this response must be the expulsion of the Israeli Ambassador from Ireland." The party's Spokesperson for International Affairs Aengus Ó Snodaigh and Gerry Adams also called for the expulsion of the ambassador. This was after Snodaigh expressed disappointment at not being allowed to go with the flotilla by Cypriot authorities. The Irish activist Shane Dillon was sent back to Ireland, though six other Irish activists – including Fintan Lane and Fiachra O Luain – were detained in the Beersheba detention camp.
- Italy condemned the Israeli military operation, and supported the UN Security Council resolution calling for an investigation and the release of detainees. Italian Foreign Minister Franco Frattini condemned the killing of civilians, saying "I deplore in the strongest terms the killing of civilians. This is certainly a grave act." Italy also called for an EU investigation. Earlier Italian Deputy Foreign Minister Alfredo Mantica had called the international flotilla to the Gaza Strip a "provocation". However, he had not justified the Israeli course of action. "The manner of the response is debatable, but to think that it would all pass without Israeli action is naiveté on the part of the organizers. I believe someone wanted to see how harsh Israel's response would be," he had said.
- (Lithuania) The Lithuanian Ministry of Foreign Affairs released a statement expressing "deep concern" over the Israeli action, offered condolences to the families of the victims and called for an investigation.
- Luxembourg Deputy Prime Minister and Minister for Foreign Affairs, Jean Asselborn, "strongly condemned those responsible for the attack on the flotilla" and demanded an international investigation to ascertain responsibilities.
- (Netherlands) Dutch foreign minister Maxime Verhagen stated, "Israel had, based on military law at sea, the authority to inspect the cargo of the convoy carrying aid supplies for Gaza." In reaction to questions by members of the Dutch Parliament, he wrote: "The risk of breaking a blockade lies with those who do so, provided that the blockade was declared properly." He also stated, "investigation, in the first place by Israel itself, must answer what exactly happened".
- Poland's Foreign Minister, Radek Sikorski said "The whole world calls for a clarification. The next step will depend on how well, and convincingly, the Israeli authorities explain what happened." He, however, did not say whether Poland would summon the Israeli ambassador to provide explanations.

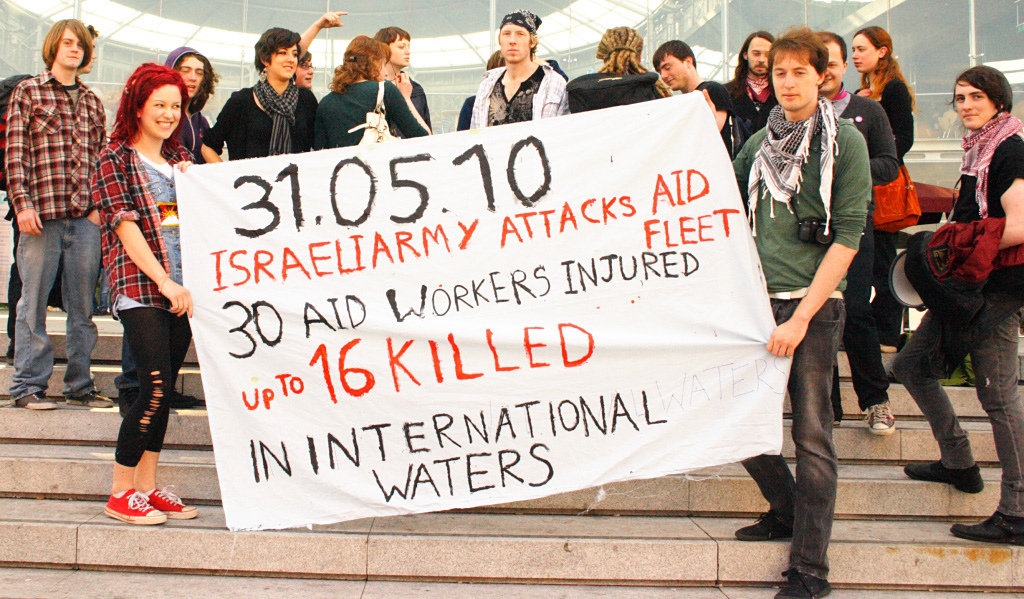
Students from the University of East Anglia outside the Forum in Norwich.

- Portugal Foreign Ministry issued a statement expressing "deep concern" over the incident, condemned the "excessive use of force against civilian targets" and called for an "impartial" investigation.
- The President of Romania Traian Băsescu told the departing Israeli ambassador Oren David that Romania was concerned about the raid on the flotilla that might result in negative consequences for the Middle East Peace Process. On 23 June 2010 at a summit of Balkan countries in Istanbul Romania was one of the countries that strongly condemned Israel's attack on the aid flotilla as well as the loss of life.
- Spain condemned the attack, has summoned the Israeli ambassador for questioning. The Foreign Minister, Miguel Angel Moratinos, decried the excessive use of force against a humanitarian convoy, and recalled that the European Union had already requested an end to the blockade.
- Sweden summoned the Israeli ambassador, Benny Dagan, to the Ministry for Foreign Affairs. The Foreign Affairs Secretary Frank Belfrage and the Minister for Foreign Affairs Carl Bildt called the Israeli raid "completely unacceptable". On 2 June, it was reported that as a reaction to Israels raid on the flotilla, the Swedish Football Association would attempt to call off an upcoming qualifying game in Israel for the 2011 UEFA European Under-21 Football Championship. On 5 June it was reported that a one-week ban of Israeli goods would be launched by the Swedish Port Workers Union.
- United Kingdom's Prime Minister David Cameron has condemned the Israeli attack, called it "completely unacceptable", and told Israel to "respond constructively" to "legitimate international criticism". Foreign Secretary William Hague said he "deplored" the loss of life and called on Israel to open border crossings for aid access. Scotland'sDeputy First Minister Nicola Sturgeon said Israel's actions had been "rightly condemned around the world". She called on Israel to lift its blockade of Gaza, and expressed her "deep sadness" at the loss of life on the flotilla. In Belfast, protests were held in front of the City Hall to condemn Israel's actions and to call for an end to the siege of Gaza.

Non-EU members

- (Albania) The Albanian Ministry of Foreign Affairs condemned the violence, considering it "unjustifiable" and calling on the "Israeli authorities to investigate immediately this incident, which has tensioned the regional and global stability".
- The Azerbaijani president, Ilham Aliyev condemned the attack: "We condemn Israel's deadly attack on the Turkish ship carrying aid to the Gaza Strip and express our support for Turkey." He also offered his condolences to the Turkish government and citizens on behalf of the Azerbaijani people. The Azerbaijani Ministry of Foreign Affairs condemned the attack. He noted that created situation caused anxiety in Azerbaijan: "Azerbaijani side considers that the conclusion of humanitarian action with human losses is a fact giving rise to anxiety. This incident must be investigated accurately in a short time and the offenders must be punished."
- Belarus' Press Secretary Andrei Savinykh condemned the Israeli attack, stating that Belarus is "very concerned" by the situation, "deplores" the use of force and considers Israel's actions to be "a gross violation of international law". He stressed the need for a full investigation into what happened and for all interested countries to calm tensions so that comprehensive peace talks could begin.

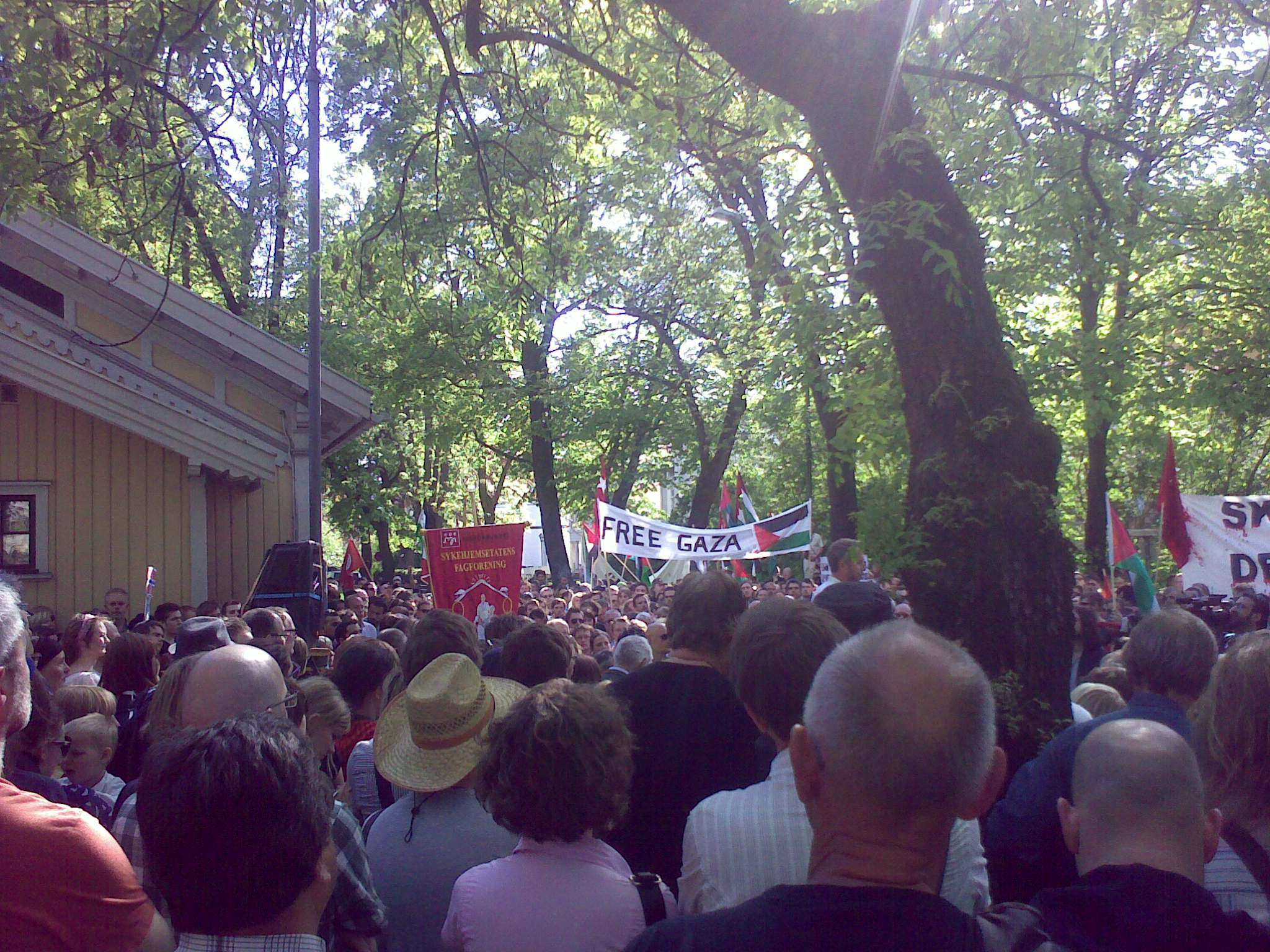
Bård Vegar Solhjell speaking to approximately 2000 demonstrators at the Israeli embassy in Oslo, Norway, following the Gaza flotilla raid.

- (Bosnia and Herzegovina) Bosnian representative at the UN Security Council, Ivan Barbalić, condemned the Israeli attack "in the strongest possible terms". He called for an investigation and for Israel to lift the blockade of Gaza.

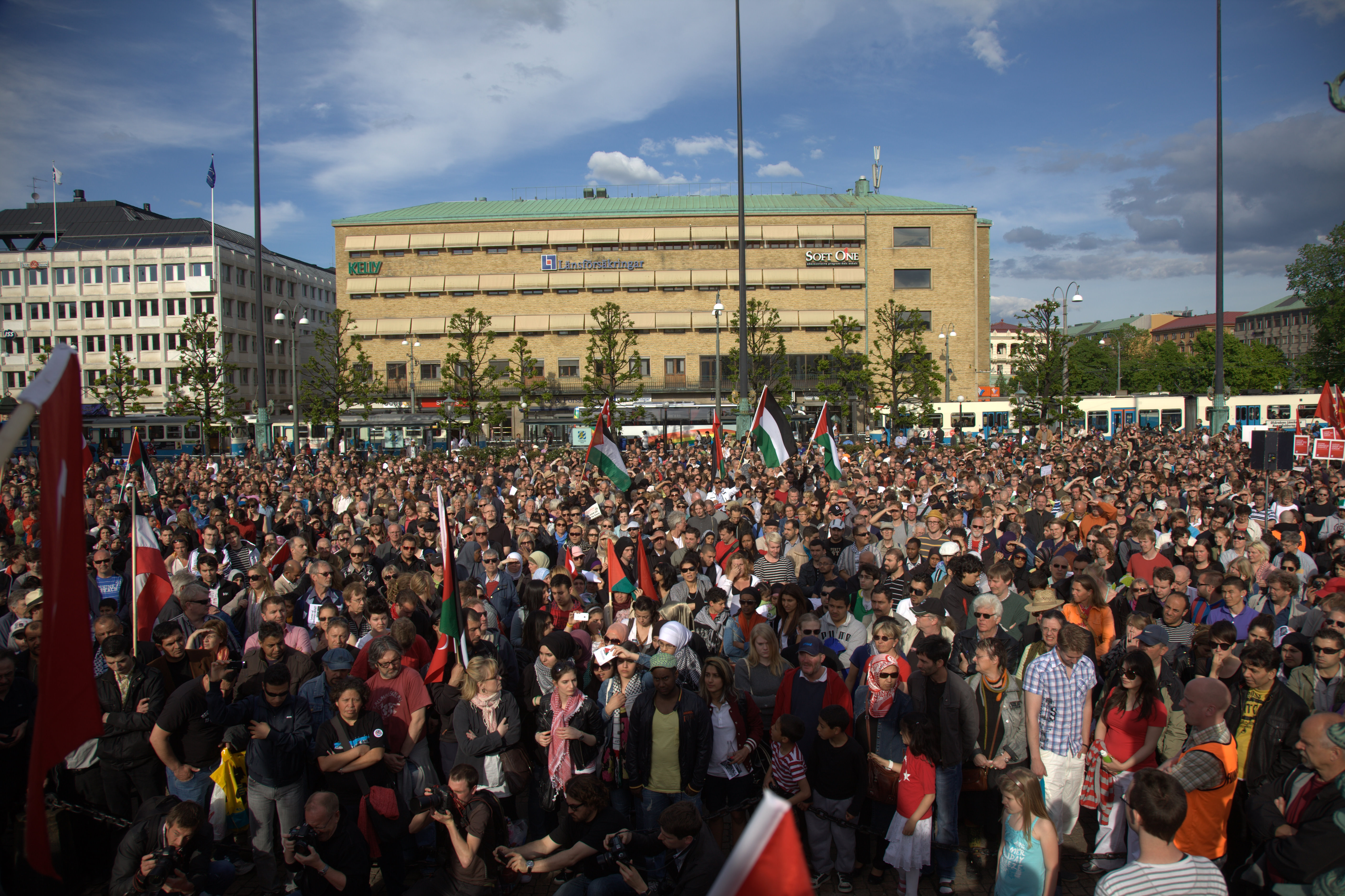
4000 people gathered on Gustav Adolfs Torg in Gothenburg, Sweden, in support of Ship to Gaza

- Croatian President Ivo Josipović, expressing deep regret over the loss of lives and injuries, gave condolences to the families of the deceased, and strongly condemned the use of violence. Croatian Ministry of Foreign Affairs and European Integration expressed regret over the loss of lives and gave condolences to the families of the deceased. It additionally underscored the need for refraining from escalation of the conflict, calling for an investigation that will meet international standards, and expressed hope that this incident will not hamper the recently restarted Middle East peace process. Furthermore, it emphasized the need for humanitarian aid access to the civilian population of the Gaza Strip. As a member of NATO, Croatia activated an emergency decision-making mechanism.
- The Foreign Minister of Iceland, Össur Skarphéðinsson, condemned the attack saying, "Gaza is in fact a giant prison where international law is violated. This must stop," and "We support the demands that have been made, e.g. by the EU, that this matter be thoroughly investigated. It is intolerable that Israel repeatedly exerts force in this way."
- Norway's Prime Minister, Jens Stoltenberg, said "a military attack against civilian activists is totally unacceptable." Foreign Minister, Jonas Gahr Støre, has called for a meeting with the Israeli ambassador to Norway. Protests also spontaneously erupted in a number of cities throughout Norway. A group of 12 Norwegian Members of Parliament wore Palestinian scarves to a session of the Norwegian Parliament as a "show of solidarity with the Palestinian people". On 4 June, the Norwegian military canceled a seminar that included a speech by an Israeli soldier. It was reported immediately after the raid that 43 percent of Norwegians either would like to boycott Israeli products, or were already doing so.
- Russia's President Dmitry Medvedev called for a thorough investigation of the incident and said that, in any case, the deaths of people are irreversible. Prime Minister Vladimir Putin condemned the assault and expressed concern that it was conducted in international waters. On 8 June, Putin condemned the acts and said it has to be investigated specially, especially since it was on international waters. The Foreign Ministries of Russia and the EU adopted a joint statement concerning the flotilla attack, which correlates with the UN Security Council activity in the situation. Russia's Foreign Ministry expressed "condemnation and profound concern" over the incident and called for a full investigation. It also called the use of "use of arms against civilians and the detention of the vessels on the high seas without any legal grounds constitute a gross violation of generally accepted international legal norms". The head of the Russian State Duma Foreign Affairs Committee, Konstantin Kosachev, called for an "urgent meeting" of the Middle East Quartet to discuss the incident.
- The Serbian Ministry of Foreign Affairs condemned the excessive use of force that caused the deaths of innocent civilians. It also endorsed the UN Security Council's call for an immediate and impartial investigation into the incident. On 23 June 2010 at a summit of Balkan countries in Istanbul, Serbia was one of the countries that strongly condemned Israel's attack on the aid flotilla as well as the loss of life.
- Switzerland called for an international inquiry and summoned the Israeli ambassador.
- (Vatican City) The Holy See expressed "great concern and pain" about the incident.

== Oceania ==
- Australian prime minister Kevin Rudd and MPs condemned the Israeli raid. Rudd stated "The Australian government condemns any use of violence under the sorts of circumstances that we have seen." Australia's Department of Foreign Affairs and Trade said it was "deeply saddened by loss of life following the incident". Prime Minister Kevin Rudd, speaking during a media conference, said the Government was "deeply concerned" by the turn of events and called for "a full investigation" and for the results to be brought before the United Nations Security Council (UNSC).
- New Zealand Foreign Affairs Minister Murray McCully condemned the Israeli attack, and urged restraint from all parties. "Representatives from our Mission in New York [are] attending the emergency meeting of the United Nations Security Council and we will continue to follow their deliberations carefully." Israel's ambassador to New Zealand Shemi Tzur was later summoned to a meeting with McCully who stated that: "I left him in no doubt about the seriousness of the Government's concerns in relation to the incident off Gaza."

== See also ==
- Reactions to the Gaza flotilla raid
- International reaction to the Gaza War
