= 2011 UEFA European Under-21 Championship qualification =

The 2011 UEFA European Under-21 Championship started with a qualifying competition which began on 27 March 2009 and finished on 13 October 2010. The final tournament was held in Denmark between 11–25 June 2011.

The first stage of the qualifying competition was a group stage followed by play-offs. Each of the 10 group winners, as well as the four highest ranked second place teams, advanced to the play-off. The play-offs determined which seven nations joined Denmark in the final tournament. Denmark, as hosts, qualified automatically.

== Groups ==
=== Summary ===
Teams that secured a place in the play-offs are highlighted in green in their respective qualifying groups. The teams are ordered by final group position.

Group 1	Group 2	Group 3	Group 4	Group 5
Romania	Switzerland	Italy	Netherlands; Spain	Czech Republic; Iceland
Russia; Moldova; Latvia; Faroe Islands; Andorra	Turkey; Georgia; Armenia; Estonia; Republic of Ireland	Wales; Hungary; Bosnia and Herzegovina; Luxembourg	Finland; Poland; Liechtenstein	Germany; Northern Ireland; San Marino

Group 6	Group 7	Group 8	Group 9	Group 10
Sweden	Croatia	Ukraine	Greece; England	Scotland; Belarus
Israel; Montenegro; Kazakhstan; Bulgaria	Slovakia; Serbia; Norway; Cyprus	Belgium; France; Slovenia; Malta	Portugal; Lithuania; Macedonia	Austria; Albania; Azerbaijan

In case of equal points, the teams are ranked by their head-to-head record:

1. number of points
2. goal difference
3. goals scored
4. goals scored away from home.

If some teams have equal head-to-head record, then the following tiebreaks apply:

1. overall goal difference
2. overall goals scored
3. overall goals scored away from home
4. fair play conduct.

=== Group 1 ===
Team	Pld	W	D	L	GF	GA	GD	Pts	(Romania)	(Russia)	(Moldova)	(Latvia)	(Faroe Islands)	(Andorra)
Romania	10	8	1	1	23	6	+17	25	—	3–0	3–0	4–1	3–0	2–0
Russia	10	7	1	2	22	6	+16	22	0–0	—	3–1	2–1	2–0	4–0
Moldova	10	4	2	4	9	13	−4	14	0–1	0–3	—	1–0	1–0	1–0
Latvia	10	4	1	5	16	15	+1	13	5–1	0–4	1–1	—	0–1	4–0
Faroe Islands	10	3	2	5	8	16	−8	11	0–4	1–0	1–1	1–3	—	3–1
Andorra	10	0	1	9	3	25	−22	1	0–2	0–4	1–3	0–1	1–1	—

=== Group 2 ===
Team	Pld	W	D	L	GF	GA	GD	Pts	(Switzerland)	(Turkey)	(Georgia (country))	(Armenia)	(Estonia)	(Republic of Ireland)
Switzerland	10	6	2	2	15	8	+7	20	—	0–2	1–0	2–1	0–1	1–0
Turkey	10	5	1	4	13	11	+2	16	1–3	—	0–1	1–0	0–0	1–0
Georgia	10	4	3	3	12	9	+3	15	0–0	4–0	—	0–2	2–0	1–1
Armenia	10	4	1	5	18	19	−1	13	1–3	2–5	2–3	—	1–1	4–1
Estonia	10	3	3	4	9	16	−7	12	1–4	1–0	2–0	2–3	—	1–1
Republic of Ireland	10	1	4	5	11	15	−4	7	1–1	0–3	1–1	1–2	5–0	—

=== Group 3 ===
Team	Pld	W	D	L	GF	GA	GD	Pts	(Italy)	(Wales)	(Hungary)	(Bosnia and Herzegovina)	(Luxembourg)
Italy	8	5	1	2	12	5	+7	16	—	1–0	2–0	1–1	2–0
Wales	8	5	1	2	15	6	+9	16	2–1	—	4–1	2–0	5–1
Hungary	8	4	1	3	9	7	+2	13	2–0	0–1	—	0–0	3–0
Bosnia and Herzegovina	8	2	2	4	4	8	−4	8	0–1	2–1	0–2	—	0–1
Luxembourg	8	1	1	6	2	16	−14	4	0–4	0–0	0–1	0–1	—

=== Group 4 ===
Team	Pld	W	D	L	GF	GA	GD	Pts	(Netherlands)	(Spain)	(Finland)	(Poland)	(Liechtenstein)
Netherlands	8	7	0	1	19	5	+14	21	—	2–1	2–0	3–2	3–0
Spain	8	6	1	1	15	5	+10	19	2–1	—	1–0	2–0	3–1
Finland	8	3	1	4	11	7	+4	10	0–1	1–1	—	2–0	3–0
Poland	8	3	0	5	11	13	−2	9	0–4	0–1	2–1	—	2–0
Liechtenstein	8	0	0	8	1	27	−26	0	0–3	0–4	0–4	0–5	—

=== Group 5 ===
Team	Pld	W	D	L	GF	GA	GD	Pts	(Czech Republic)	(Iceland)	(Germany)	(Northern Ireland)	(San Marino)
Czech Republic	8	7	1	0	25	4	+21	22	—	3–1	1–1	2–0	5–0
Iceland	8	5	1	2	29	11	+18	16	0–2	—	4–1	2–1	8–0
Germany	8	3	3	2	26	10	+16	12	1–2	2–2	—	3–0	6–0
Northern Ireland	8	2	1	5	12	16	−4	7	1–2	2–6	1–1	—	4–0
San Marino	8	0	0	8	0	51	−51	0	0–8	0–6	0–11	0–3	—

=== Group 6 ===
Team	Pld	W	D	L	GF	GA	GD	Pts	(Sweden)	(Israel)	(Montenegro)	(Kazakhstan)	(Bulgaria)
Sweden	8	6	1	1	15	5	+10	19	—	1–2	2–0	5–1	2–1
Israel	8	5	1	2	18	8	+10	16	0–1	—	5–0	1–1	4–0
Montenegro	8	4	1	3	9	11	−2	13	0–2	1–0	—	3–1	2–0
Kazakhstan	8	1	2	5	7	17	−10	5	1–1	1–2	0–2	—	2–0
Bulgaria	8	1	1	6	8	16	−8	4	0–1	3–4	1–1	3–0	—

=== Group 7 ===
Team	Pld	W	D	L	GF	GA	GD	Pts	(Croatia)	(Slovakia)	(Serbia)	(Norway)	(Cyprus)
Croatia	8	5	2	1	17	10	+7	17	—	1–1	3–1	4–1	0–2
Slovakia	8	4	2	2	11	11	0	14	1–2	—	2–1	1–4	1–0
Serbia	8	4	1	3	14	12	+2	13	2–2	1–2	—	3–2	2–0
Norway	8	2	1	5	14	18	−4	7	1–3	2–2	0–1	—	1–3
Cyprus	8	2	0	6	8	13	−5	6	1–2	0–1	1–3	1–3	—

=== Group 8 ===
Team	Pld	W	D	L	GF	GA	GD	Pts	(Ukraine)	(Belgium)	(France)	(Slovenia)	(Malta)
Ukraine	8	4	4	0	13	5	+8	16	—	1–1	2–2	0–0	1–0
Belgium	8	4	3	1	8	5	+3	15	0–2	—	0–0	2–0	1–0
France	8	4	3	1	12	6	+6	15	2–2	0–1	—	1–0	2–0
Slovenia	8	2	2	4	6	10	−4	8	0–2	2–2	1–3	—	1–0
Malta	8	0	0	8	0	13	−13	0	0–3	0–1	0–2	0–2	—

=== Group 9 ===
Team	Pld	W	D	L	GF	GA	GD	Pts	(Greece)	(England)	(Portugal)	(Lithuania)	(North Macedonia)
Greece	8	6	1	1	13	7	+6	19	—	1–1	2–1	1–0	3–1
England	8	5	2	1	15	7	+8	17	1–2	—	1–0	3–0	6–3
Portugal	8	4	1	3	12	8	+4	13	2–1	0–1	—	4–1	3–1
Lithuania	8	1	2	5	3	11	−8	5	0–1	0–0	0–1	—	1–0
Macedonia	8	0	2	6	9	19	−10	2	1–2	1–2	1–1	1–1	—

=== Group 10 ===
Team	Pld	W	D	L	GF	GA	GD	Pts	(Scotland)	(Belarus)	(Austria)	(Albania)	(Azerbaijan)
Scotland	8	5	2	1	16	7	+9	17	—	1–0	3–1	5–2	2–2
Belarus	8	5	2	1	16	11	+5	17	1–1	—	2–1	4–2	1–0
Austria	8	4	2	2	17	11	+6	14	1–0	3–3	—	3–1	4–0
Albania	8	1	1	6	11	20	−9	4	0–1	1–2	2–2	—	1–0
Azerbaijan	8	1	1	6	8	19	−11	4	0–4	2–3	1–2	3–2	—

=== Ranking of second-placed teams ===
Since Groups 1 and 2 were composed of six teams, results against the 6th-ranked team were excluded.

Grp	Team	Pld	W	D	L	GF	GA	GD	Pts
4	Spain	8	6	1	1	15	5	+10	19
9	England	8	5	2	1	15	7	+8	17
10	Belarus	8	5	2	1	16	11	+5	17
5	Iceland	8	5	1	2	29	11	+18	16
6	Israel	8	5	1	2	18	8	+10	16
3	Wales	8	5	1	2	15	6	+9	16
1	Russia	8	5	1	2	14	6	+8	16
8	Belgium	8	4	3	1	8	5	+3	15
7	Slovakia	8	4	2	2	11	11	0	14
2	Turkey	8	3	1	4	9	11	−2	10

Rules for classification: 1. Total points, 2. Goal difference, 3. Goals scored, 4. Goals scored away from home, 5. Disciplinary record, 6. Drawing of lots.

== Play-offs ==
The play-off first legs played on 9 October 2010, second legs played on 13 October 2010.

Team 1	Agg.	Team 2	1st leg	2nd leg
England	2–1	Romania	2–1	0–0
Netherlands	3–3 (a)	Ukraine	1–3	2–0
Spain	5–1	Croatia	2–1	3–0
Switzerland	5–2	Sweden	4–1	1–1
Iceland	4–2	Scotland	2–1	2–1
Czech Republic	5–0	Greece	3–0	2–0
Italy	2–3	Belarus	2–0	0–3

== Qualified teams ==
Country	Qualified as	Date qualification was secured	Previous appearances in tournament
Denmark	Host	10 December 2008	4 (1978, 1986, 1992, 2006)
Switzerland	Play-off winners against Sweden	11 October 2010	2 (2002, 2004)
Iceland	Play-off winners against Scotland	11 October 2010	First appearance
England	Play-off winners against Romania	12 October 2010	10 (1978, 1980, 1982, 1984, 1986, 1988, 2000, 2002, 2007, 2009)
Spain	Play-off winners against Croatia	12 October 2010	10 (1982, 1984, 1986, 1988, 1990, 1994, 1996, 1998, 2000, 2009)
Belarus	Play-off winners against Italy	12 October 2010	2 (2004, 2009)
Czech Republic	Play-off winners against Greece	12 October 2010	4 (1996, 2000, 2002, 2007)
Ukraine	Play-off winners against Netherlands	12 October 2010	1 (2006)
