= 2011 UEFA European Under-21 Championship qualification Group 6 =

Football tournament qualification stage

The teams competing in Group 6 of the 2011 UEFA European Under-21 Championships qualifying competition were Bulgaria, Israel, Kazakhstan, Montenegro and Sweden.

== Standings ==
Team	Pld	W	D	L	GF	GA	GD	Pts	(Sweden)	(Israel)	(Montenegro)	(Kazakhstan)	(Bulgaria)
Sweden	8	6	1	1	15	5	+10	19	—	1–2	2–0	5–1	2–1
Israel	8	5	1	2	18	8	+10	16	0–1	—	5–0	1–1	4–0
Montenegro	8	4	1	3	9	11	−2	13	0–2	1–0	—	3–1	2–0
Kazakhstan	8	1	2	5	7	17	−10	5	1–1	1–2	0–2	—	2–0
Bulgaria	8	1	1	6	8	16	−8	4	0–1	3–4	1–1	3–0	—

== Matches ==
29 March 2009
15:00 CEST

Israel	1–1	Kazakhstan
Buzaglo 41'	Report	Kenetaev 62'

Kiryat Eliezer Stadium, Haifa
Referee: Richard Liesveld (Netherlands)

2 April 2009
12:00 CEST

Kazakhstan	2–0	Bulgaria
Ibraev 70'; Erbes 90+1'	Report

Almaty Central Stadium, Almaty
Referee: Thomas Vejlgaard (Denmark)

7 June 2009
15:00 CEST

Kazakhstan	0–2	Montenegro
	Report	Jovetić 17'; Lakičević 50'

Almaty Central Stadium, Almaty
Referee: Yunus Yıldırım (Turkey)
10 June 2009
17:00 CEST

Bulgaria	3–4	Israel
Baltanov 3'; Cvetanov 59'; Ivanov 67'	Report	Zhairi 7'; Kayal 29'; Tamuz 54'; Sahar 90'

Georgi Asparuhov Stadium, Sofia
Referee: Dimitrios Kalopoulos (Greece)

4 September 2009
17:00 CEST

Bulgaria	3–0	Kazakhstan
Tonev 58'; Baltanov 64', 90+4'	Report

Gradski Stadium, Lovech
Referee: Sten Kaldma (Estonia)
4 September 2009
20:00 CEST

Montenegro	0–2	Sweden
	Report	Ekdal 84'; Mehmeti 89'

Podgorica City Stadium, Podgorica,
Referee: Alan Black (Northern Ireland)

9 September 2009
13:00 CEST

Kazakhstan	1–2	Israel
Dautov 58'	Report	Natcho 56'; Tamuz 90+1'

Kazhimukan Munaitpasov Stadium, Astana
Referee: Igor Ishchenko (Ukraine)
9 September 2009
20:45 CEST

Sweden	2–1	Bulgaria
Olsson 32'; Bajrami 54'	Report	Genev 56'

Vångavallen, Trelleborg
Referee: Luc Wouters (Belgium)

10 October 2009
17:00 CEST

Bulgaria	1–1	Montenegro
Baltanov 68' (pen.)	Report	Djurović 77'

Gradski Stadium, Lovech
Referee: Euan Norris (Scotland)
11 October 2009
11:00 CEST

Kazakhstan	1–1	Sweden
Shabalin 51'	Report	Almebäck 88'

Kazhimukan Munaitpasov Stadium, Astana
Referee: Boško Jovanetić (Serbia)

14 October 2009
15:00 CEST

Montenegro	3–1	Kazakhstan
Adrović 11'; Djurović 43'; N. Nikolić 82'	Report	Abdukarimov 83'

Stadion Gradski, Nikšić
Referee: Ararat Tshagharyan (Armenia)

14 November 2009
13:00 CEST

Montenegro	1–0	Israel
S. Nikolić 5'	Report

Podgorica City Stadium, Podgorica
Referee: Andrea De Marco (Italy)
15 November 2009
17:00 CEST

Sweden	5–1	Kazakhstan
Fejzullahu 32', 50', 56', 67'; Ekdal 60'	Report	Shomko 89'

Swedbank Stadion, Malmö
Referee: Paulius Malzinskas (Lithuania)

18 November 2009
18:00 CEST

Israel	4–0	Bulgaria
Sahar 7', 24', 57'; Vered 32'	Report

Ramat Gan Stadium, Ramat Gan
Referee: Fritz Stuchlik (Austria)

3 March 2010
17:00 CEST

Montenegro	2–0	Bulgaria
Djurović 24'; Božović 89'	Report

Podgorica City Stadium, Podgorica
Referee: Mattias Gestranius (Finland)

4 June 2010
16:05 CEST

Israel	0–1	Sweden
	Report	Avdić 58'

Ness Ziona Stadium, Ness Ziona
Referee: Babak Rafati (Germany)

8 June 2010
19:15 CEST

Sweden	2–0	Montenegro
Avdić 33' (pen.); Jönsson 89'	Report

Örjans Vall, Halmstad
Referee: Stephan Studer (Switzerland)

3 September 2010
17:30 CEST

Sweden	1–2	Israel
Mehmeti 77'	Report	Natcho 38'; Vered 64'

Gamla Ullevi, Gothenburg
Referee: Euan Norris (Scotland)

7 September 2010
17:00 CEST

Israel	5–0	Montenegro
Natcho 2', 77'; Buzaglo 27' (pen.), 57'; Tchokol 86'	Report

Haberfeld Stadium, Rishon LeZion
Referee: Jérome Efong Nzolo (Belgium)
7 September 2010
17:00 CEST

Bulgaria	0–1	Sweden
	Report	Hamad 90'

Gradski Stadium, Lovech
Referee: Dawid Piasecki (Poland)

== Goalscorers ==
As of 3 September, there have been 51 goals scored over 18 games, for an average of 2.83 goals per game.

Goals	Player	Country
4	Lachezar Baltanov	Bulgaria
4	Ben Sahar	Israel
4	Erton Fejzullahu	Sweden
3	Marko Djurović	Montenegro
2	Bibras Natcho	Israel
2	Toto Tamuz	Israel
2	Idan Vered	Israel
2	Denni Avdić	Sweden
2	Albin Ekdal	Sweden
2	Agon Mehmeti	Sweden

1 goal

Bulgaria
- Momchil Cvetanov
- Victor Genev
- Ivan Ivanov
- Aleksandar Tonev

Israel
- Maor Buzaglo
- Beram Kayal
- Liroy Zhairi

Kazakhstan
- Khassan Abdukarimov
- Damir Dautov
- Vyacheslav Erbes
- Sabyrkhan Ibraev
- Ruslan Kenetaev
- Pavel Shabalin
- Dmitri Shomko

Montenegro
- Zijad Adrović
- Draško Božović
- Stevan Jovetić
- Slobodan Lakičević
- Nemanja Nikolić
- Stefan Nikolić

Sweden
- Michael Almebäck
- Emir Bajrami
- Rasmus Jönsson
- Martin Olsson
