= 2011 UEFA European Under-21 Championship qualification Group 7 =

International football competition

The teams competing in Group 7 of the 2011 UEFA European Under-21 Championships qualifying competition were Croatia, Cyprus, Norway, Serbia and Slovakia.

== Standings ==
Team	Pld	W	D	L	GF	GA	GD	Pts	(Croatia)	(Slovakia)	(Serbia)	(Norway)	(Cyprus)
Croatia	8	5	2	1	17	10	+7	17	—	1–1	3–1	4–1	0–2
Slovakia	8	4	2	2	11	11	0	14	1–2	—	2–1	1–4	1–0
Serbia	8	4	1	3	14	12	+2	13	2–2	1–2	—	3–2	2–0
Norway	8	2	1	5	14	18	−4	7	1–3	2–2	0–1	—	1–3
Cyprus	8	2	0	6	8	13	−5	6	1–2	0–1	1–3	1–3	—

Qualification

- Croatia secured a qualification to the UEFA Play-offs.
- Serbia, Norway and Cyprus are eliminated.

== Matches ==
7 June 2009
17:30 CEST

Croatia	0–2	Cyprus
	Report	Kolokoudias 12', 39'

Koprivnica Gradski Stadion, Koprivnica
Referee: Hubert Siejewicz (Poland)
10 June 2009
18:00 CEST

Norway	2–2	Slovakia
Berget 53' (pen.); Orry Larsen 90'	Report	Sylvestr 26'; Juhar 75'

Viking Stadion, Stavanger
Referee: Yuriy Moseychuk (Ukraine)

12 August 2009
19:00 CEST

Cyprus	1–3	Norway
Efrem 80' (pen.)	Report	Singh 30'; Elyounoussi 75'; Katsis 66' (o.g.)

Dasaki Achnas, Famagusta
Referee: Carlos Xistra (Portugal)

5 September 2009
16:30 CEST

Serbia	1–2	Slovakia
Bosančić 74'	Report	Gergel 55'; Lacny 90'

Vojvodina Stadium, Novi Sad
Referee: Alan Muir (Scotland)
5 September 2009
18:30 CEST

Norway	1–3	Croatia
Berget 19'	Report	Jajalo 12', 55'; Kramarić 82'

Fredrikstad Stadion, Fredrikstad
Referee: Phillippe Kalt (France)

9 September 2009
16:30 CEST

Slovakia	1–0	Cyprus
Sylvestr 68'	Report

Štadión FK Senica, Senica
Referee: Anthony Buttimer (Republic of Ireland)
9 September 2009
18:00 CEST

Norway	0–1	Serbia
	Report	Milanović 90+2'

Fredrikstad Stadion, Fredrikstad
Referee: Simon Lee Evans (Wales)

9 October 2009
15:00 CEST

Serbia	2–0	Cyprus
Milanović 18'; Aleksić 89'	Report

Vojvodina Stadium, Novi Sad
Referee: Levan Paniashvili (Georgia)

13 October 2009
17:30 CEST

Croatia	3–1	Serbia
Oremuš 32'; Kramarić 52'; Ljubičić 83'	Report	Tomić 69'

Stadion Varteks, Varaždin
Referee: Manuel Gräfe (Germany)
14 October 2009
16:00 CEST

Cyprus	0–1	Slovakia
	Report	Stoch 46'

Dasaki Achnas, Famagusta
Referee: Menashe Masiah (Israel)

14 November 2009
15:00 CET

Cyprus	1–2	Croatia
Christofi 25'	Report	Vida 60'; Rakitić 65'

Peyia Municipal Stadium, Paphos
Referee: Fernando Teixeira Vitienes (Spain)
15 November 2009
12:00 CET

Serbia	3–2	Norway
Sulejmani 42', 52', 72'	Report	Forren 2'; Elyounoussi 34'

Vojvodina Stadium, Novi Sad
Referee: Mauro Bergonzi (Italy)

18 November 2009
16:30 CET

Slovakia	1–2	Croatia
Sylvestr 47'	Report	Kalinić 28'; Vida 86'

Štadión FC ViOn, Zlaté Moravce
Referee: Mark Courtney (Northern Ireland)

19 May 2010
17:30 CEST

Croatia	1–1	Slovakia
Rakitić 32'	Report	Ďuriš 30'

Stadion Varteks, Varaždin
Referee: Vladimir Pettay (Russia)

11 August 2010
17:00 CEST

Slovakia	2–1	Serbia
Sylvestr 14', 60'	Report	Đuričić 69'

Štadión FC ViOn, Zlaté Moravce
Referee: Said Ennjimi (France)
11 August 2010
17:30 CEST

Croatia	4–1	Norway
Lovren 3', 82'; Jajalo 25'; Kreilach 90'	Report	Henriksen 52'

Stadion Varteks, Varaždin
Referee: João Ferreira (Portugal)

3 September 2010
18:00 CEST

Norway	1–3	Cyprus
Fellah 78'	Report	Sielis 51'; Pittaras 59', 65'

Color Line Stadion, Ålesund
Referee: Kristo Tohver (Estonia)
4 September 2010
16:00 CEST

Serbia	2–2	Croatia
Šćepović 3'; Đuričić 82'	Report	Perišić 12', 31'

Čika Dača Stadium, Kragujevac
Referee: Lee Probert (England)

7 September 2010
17:00 CEST

Cyprus	1–3	Serbia
Efrem 50' (pen.)	Report	Šćepović 36'; Marković 54'; Savić 78'

Dasaki Achnas, Famagusta
Referee: Nikolay Yordanov (Bulgaria)
7 September 2010
17:00 CEST

Slovakia	1–4	Norway
Sylvestr 76'	Report	Fellah 20', 55'; Elyounoussi 83', 84'

Štadión FC ViOn, Zlaté Moravce
Referee: Christof Virant (Belgium)

== Goalscorers ==
There have been scored 64 goals over 20 games, for an average of 3.2 goals per game.

Goals	Player	Country
6	Jakub Sylvestr	Slovakia
4	Tarik Elyounoussi	Norway
3	Mato Jajalo	Croatia
3	Mohammed Fellah	Norway
3	Miralem Sulejmani	Serbia
2	Dejan Lovren	Croatia
2	Andrej Kramarić	Croatia
2	Ivan Rakitić	Croatia
2	Domagoj Vida	Croatia
2	Ivan Perišić	Croatia
2	Georgios Efrem	Cyprus
2	Georgios Kolokoudias	Cyprus
2	Andreas Pittaras	Cyprus
2	Jo Inge Berget	Norway
2	Filip Đuričić	Serbia
2	Milan Milanović	Serbia
2	Stefan Šćepović	Serbia

1 goal

Croatia
- Nikola Kalinić
- Damir Kreilach
- Krešo Ljubičić
- Mirko Oremuš

Cyprus
- Demetris Christofi
- Valentinos Sielis

Own Goals

- (Cyprus) Antonis Katsis (for Norway)

Norway
- Vegard Forren
- Markus Henriksen
- Peter Orry Larsen
- Harmeet Singh

Slovakia
- Michal Ďuriš
- Roman Gergel
- Martin Juhar
- Miloš Lačný
- Miroslav Stoch

Serbia
- Danijel Aleksić
- Miloš Bosančić
- Saša Marković
- Vujadin Savić
- Nemanja Tomić
