= 2011 UEFA European Under-21 Championship qualification play-offs =

Football tournament qualification play-offs

The play-off first legs were played on 8 October 2010, while the second legs were played on 12 October 2010. Winners of play-off round and host nation Denmark will participate in the championship next year.

== Matches ==
The draw took place on 10 September 2010 in Herning, Denmark. Fourteen teams were drawn into seven two-legged ties. The matches between Iceland and Scotland were moved back a day to avoid a fixture clash with full internationals.

Team 1	Agg.	Team 2	1st leg	2nd leg
England	2–1	Romania	2–1	0–0
Netherlands	3–3 (a)	Ukraine	1–3	2–0
Spain	5–1	Croatia	2–1	3–0
Switzerland	5–2	Sweden	4–1	1–1
Iceland	4–2	Scotland	2–1	2–1
Czech Republic	5–0	Greece	3–0	2–0
Italy	2–3	Belarus	2–0	0–3 (aet)

== First leg ==
7 October 2010
20:15

Switzerland	4 – 1	Sweden
Frei 2'; Hochstrasser 20'; Mehmedi 52'; Kasami 83'	Report	Molins 50'

Stade Tourbillon, Sion
Referee: Vladislav Bezborodov (Russia)

7 October 2010
21:00

Iceland	2 – 1	Scotland
Guðmundsson 34'; Ormarsson 78'	Report	Murphy 19'

Laugardalsvöllur, Reykjavík
Referee: Bas Nijhuis (Netherlands)

8 October 2010
16:00

Czech Republic	3 – 0	Greece
Vošahlík 1'; Pekhart 19' (pen.); Kozák 77'	Report

Stadion Střelnice, Jablonec nad Nisou
Referee: Stephan Studer (Switzerland)

8 October 2010
18:00

Italy	2 – 0	Belarus
Destro 30'; Okaka 61'	Report

Stadio Centro d'Italia, Rieti
Referee: Michael Koukoulakis (Greece)

8 October 2010
20:30

England	2 – 1	Romania
Henderson 63'; Smalling 83'	Report	Hora 71'

Carrow Road, Norwich
Attendance: 25,749
Referee: Paolo Tagliavento (Italy)

9 October 2010
19:00

Netherlands	1 – 3	Ukraine
de Jong 78'	Report	Kryvtsov 2', 7'; Konoplianka 73' (pen.)

Het Kasteel, Rotterdam
Referee: Mark Clattenburg (England)

9 October 2010
21:30

Spain	2 – 1	Croatia
Adrián 21'; San José 42'	Report	Školnik 22'

El Plantío, Burgos
Referee: István Vad (Hungary)

== Second leg ==
11 October 2010
20:00

Sweden	1 – 1	Switzerland
Bengtsson 15'	Report	Khalifa 47'

Swedbank Stadion, Malmö
Referee: Marijo Strahonja (Croatia)

Switzerland won 5–2 on aggregate

11 October 2010
20:45

Scotland	1 – 2	Iceland
Maguire 75'	Report	Sigurðsson 74', 80'

Easter Road, Edinburgh
Referee: Markus Strömbergsson (Sweden)

Iceland won 4–2 on aggregate

12 October 2010
13:30

Romania	0 – 0	England
	Report

Municipal, Botoșani
Attendance: 6,247
Referee: Fredy Fautrel (France)

England won 2–1 on aggregate

12 October 2010
16:00

Croatia	0 – 3	Spain
	Report	Domínguez 67'; Adrián 89'; Jeffrén 90+1'

Stadion Varteks, Varaždin
Referee: William Collum (Scotland)

Spain won 5–1 on aggregate

12 October 2010
16:30

Belarus	3 – 0 (a.e.t.)	Italy
Yurchenko 4', 5'; Veretilo 96'	Report

City Stadium, Borisov
Referee: Cüneyt Çakır (Turkey)

Belarus won 3–2 on aggregate

12 October 2010
17:00

Greece	0 – 2	Czech Republic
	Report	Pekhart 19'; Kozák 79'

Asteras Tripolis Stadium, Tripoli
Referee: Svein Oddvar Moen (Norway)

Czech Republic won 5–0 on aggregate

12 October 2010
19:00

Ukraine	0 – 2	Netherlands
	Report	Dost 45'; Goossens 57'

Valeri Lobanovsky Stadium, Kyiv
Referee: Robert Schörgenhofer (Austria)

3–3 on aggregate, Ukraine won on away goals rule.
