= Michael Almebäck =

Swedish footballer (born 1988)

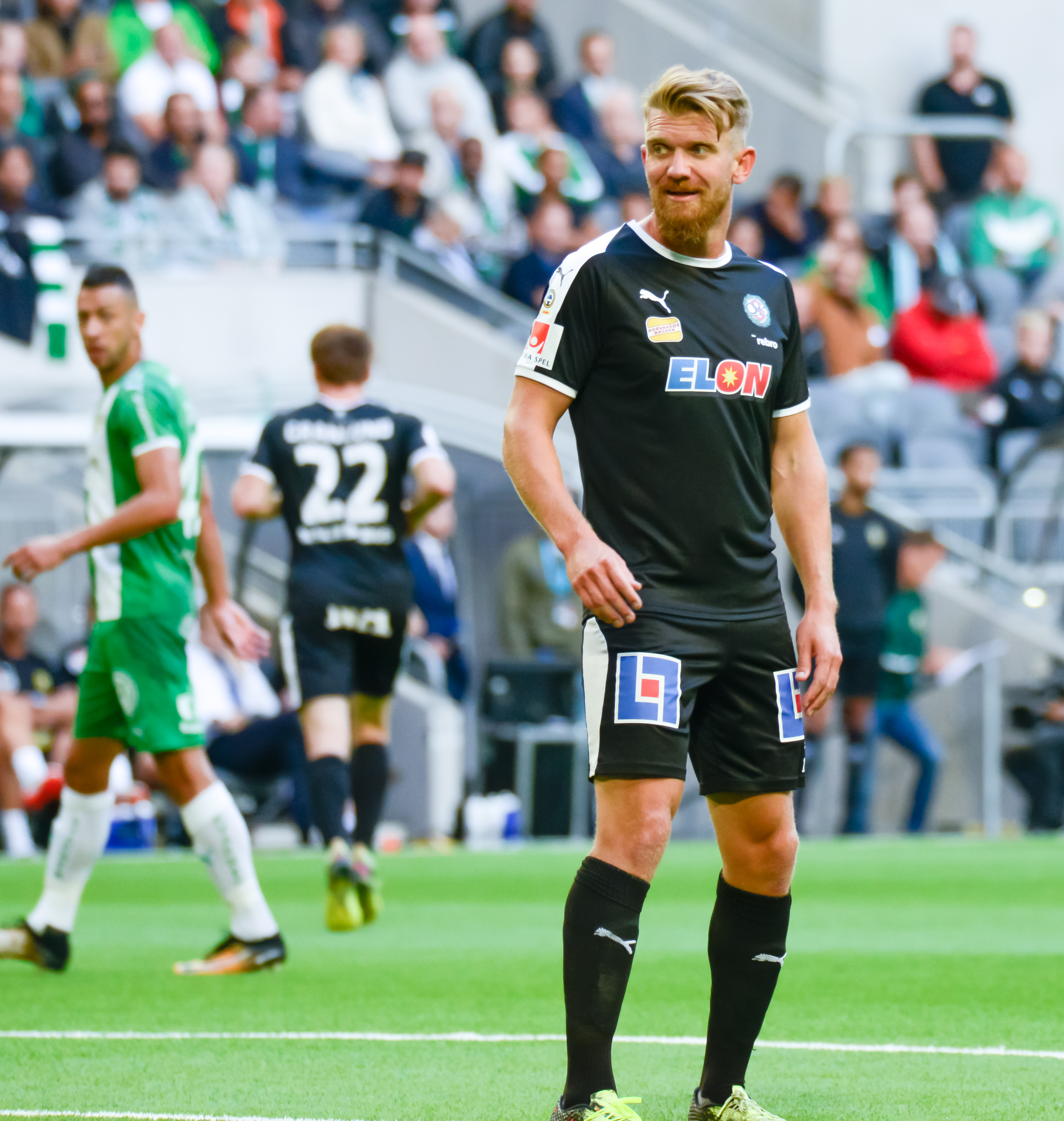
- Michael Almebäck in 2018

Personal information
- Full name: Michael Carl-Eric Almebäck
- Date of birth: 4 April 1988 (age 38)
- Place of birth: Stockholm, Sweden
- Height: 1.84 m (6 ft 0 in)
- Position: Centre-back

Youth career
- –1998: Ängby IF
- 1999–2006: IF Brommapojkarna

Senior career*
Years	Team	Apps	(Gls)
2006–2008	IF Brommapojkarna	22	(0)
2009–2011	Örebro SK	68	(0)
2011–2013	Club Brugge	61	(0)
2013–2016	Brøndby	16	(0)
2015–2016	→ Esbjerg (loan)	22	(0)
2016–2021	Örebro SK	147	(1)
Total		336	(1)

International career
2005	Sweden U17	2	(0)
2005–2007	Sweden U19	13	(1)
2009–2010	Sweden U21	9	(0)
2010–2011	Sweden	4	(0)
- * Club domestic league appearances and goals

Michael Almebäck (born 4 April 1988) is a Swedish former professional footballer who played as a centre-back.

== Career ==
After being rejected by IF Brommapojkarna, Almebäck received an opportunity to play at Örebro SK. Almebäck's breakthrough season was in 2009, when he became part of the Örebro's defensive line. He was one of Örebros best players that season and Almebäck was voted Örebro SK's 'Player of the Year' that season. After the summer break of 2009, Almebäck was nominated for the "Newcomer of the Year" award in Swedish football, which he failed to win.

In the summer of 2011, Almebäck signed for Belgian title contenders Club Brugge, where he immediately became a regular first team player. Almebäck scored his first goal for the club during a friendly against Tubize on 7 July.

In the summer of 2013 he signed a three-year contract with the Danish club Brøndby IF.

In the winter of 2016, Almebäck returned to the Swedish top tier club Örebro SK, signing a three-year contract. He left the club in December 2021, as his contract expired.

In April 2022, Almebäck announced his retirement from football after failing to find a new club.
