= Slobodan Lakićević =

Montenegrin footballer

Personal information
- Full name: Slobodan Lakićević
- Date of birth: 12 January 1988 (age 38)
- Place of birth: Bijelo Polje, SFR Yugoslavia
- Height: 1.87 m (6 ft 2 in)
- Position: Midfielder

Senior career*
Years	Team	Apps	(Gls)
2007–2008	Bayer 04 Leverkusen II	21	(4)
2008–2009	SV Wehen Wiesbaden	3	(0)
2008–2009	→ SV Wehen Wiesbaden II (loan)	20	(3)
2009–2010	Budućnost	11	(0)
2011–2012	Velež Mostar	16	(0)
2012	Pécs	0	(0)
2013–2014	Čelik Zenica	33	(0)
2015–2016	Dečić	13	(3)
2016	Sloboda Tuzla	4	(0)
2016–2017	Jedinstvo BP	15	(0)
2017	Rudar Pljevlja	11	(0)

International career
	Montenegro U-21	12	(1)
2010	Montenegro	1	(0)
- * Club domestic league appearances and goals as of 5 August 2017

Slobodan Lakićević (Cyrillic: Слободан Лакићевић, born 12 January 1988 in Bijelo Polje) is a Montenegrin retired football player who last played for Rudar Pljevlja.

== Club career ==
Lakićević played in the German second tier for SV Wehen Wiesbaden and had three different spells in Bosnia and Herzegovina.

== International career ==
He made his debut for Montenegro in a March 2010 friendly match against Macedonia, coming on as a late substitute for Luka Pejović. It remained his sole international appearance.
