= Coyoacán =

- Borough
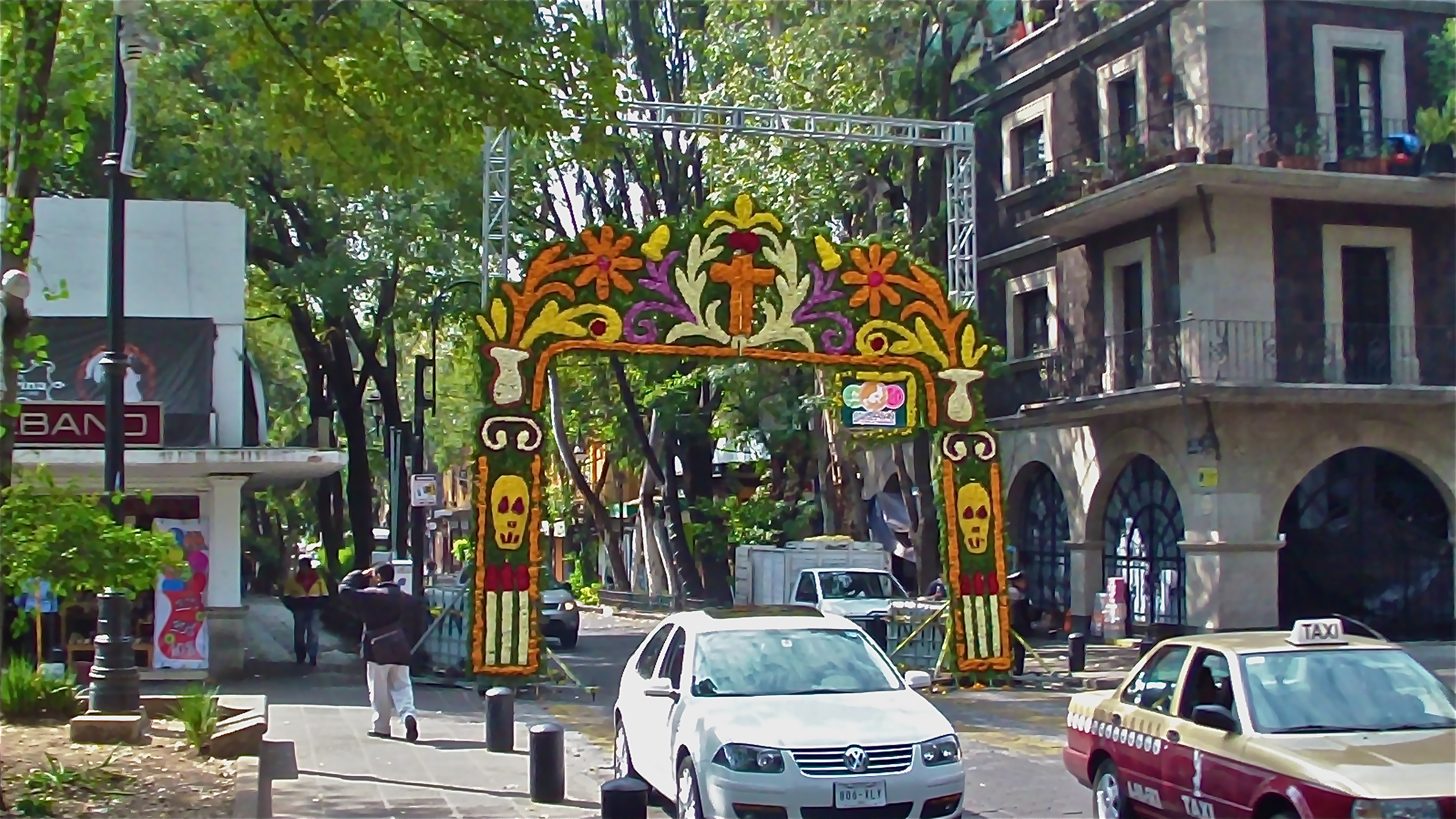
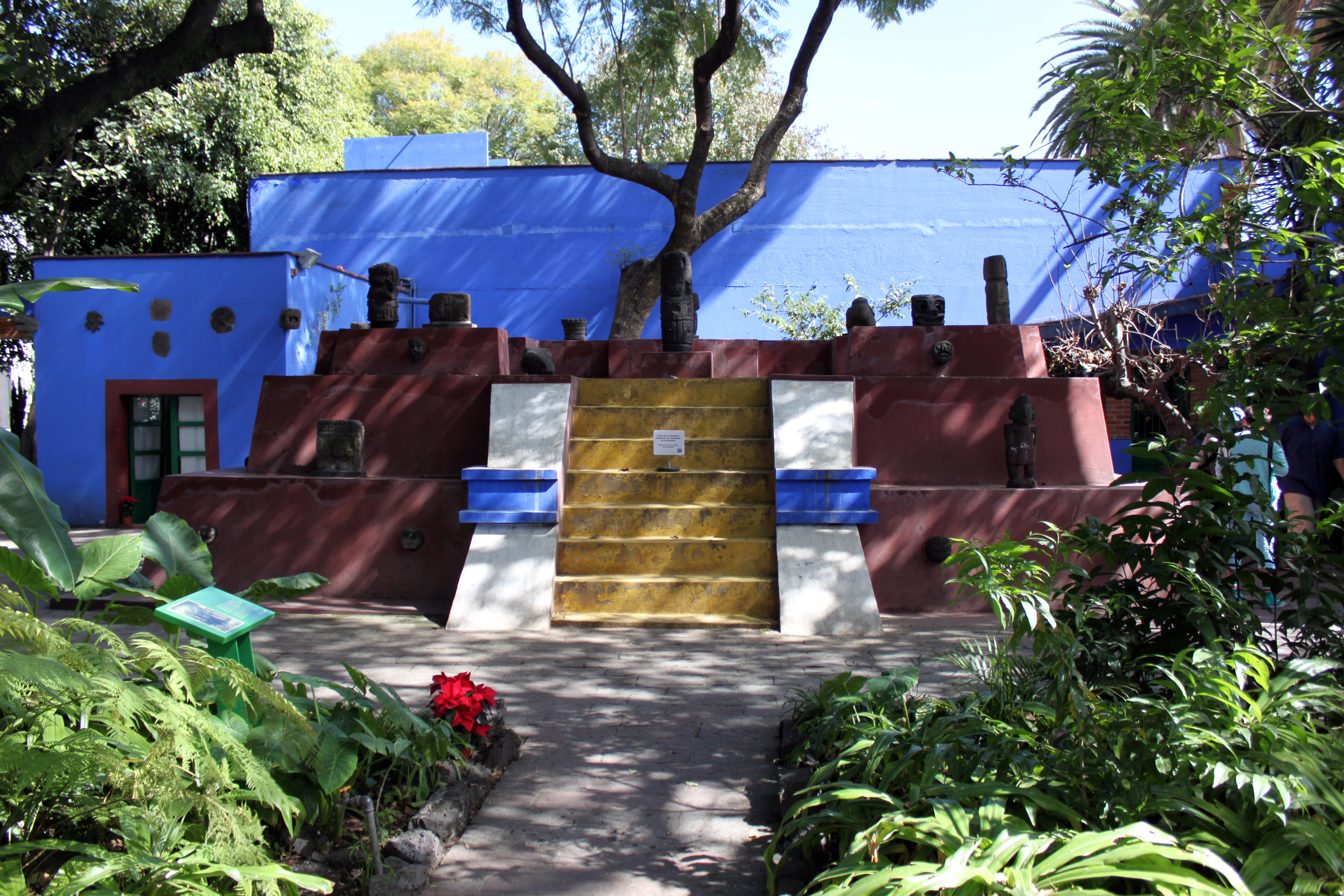
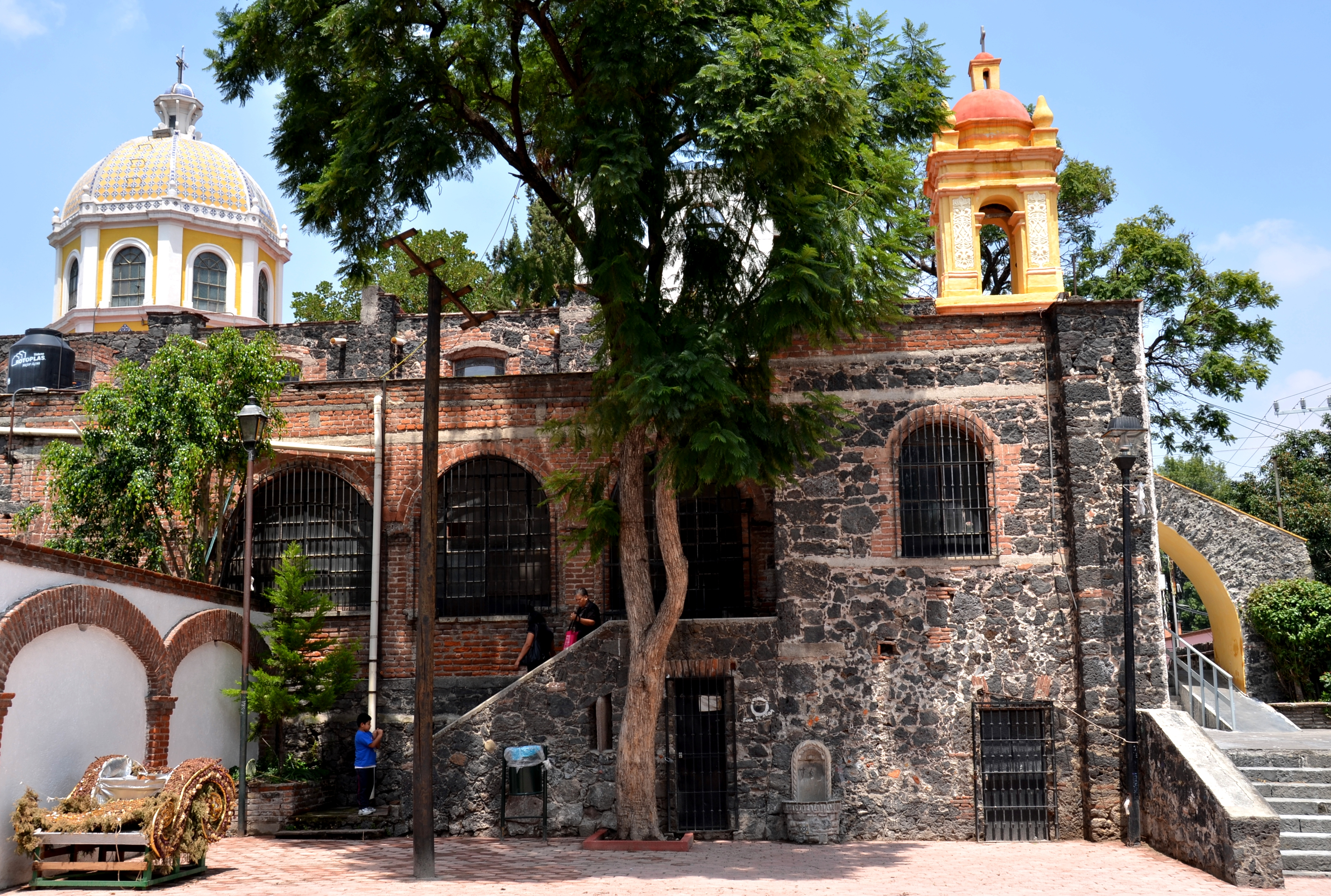
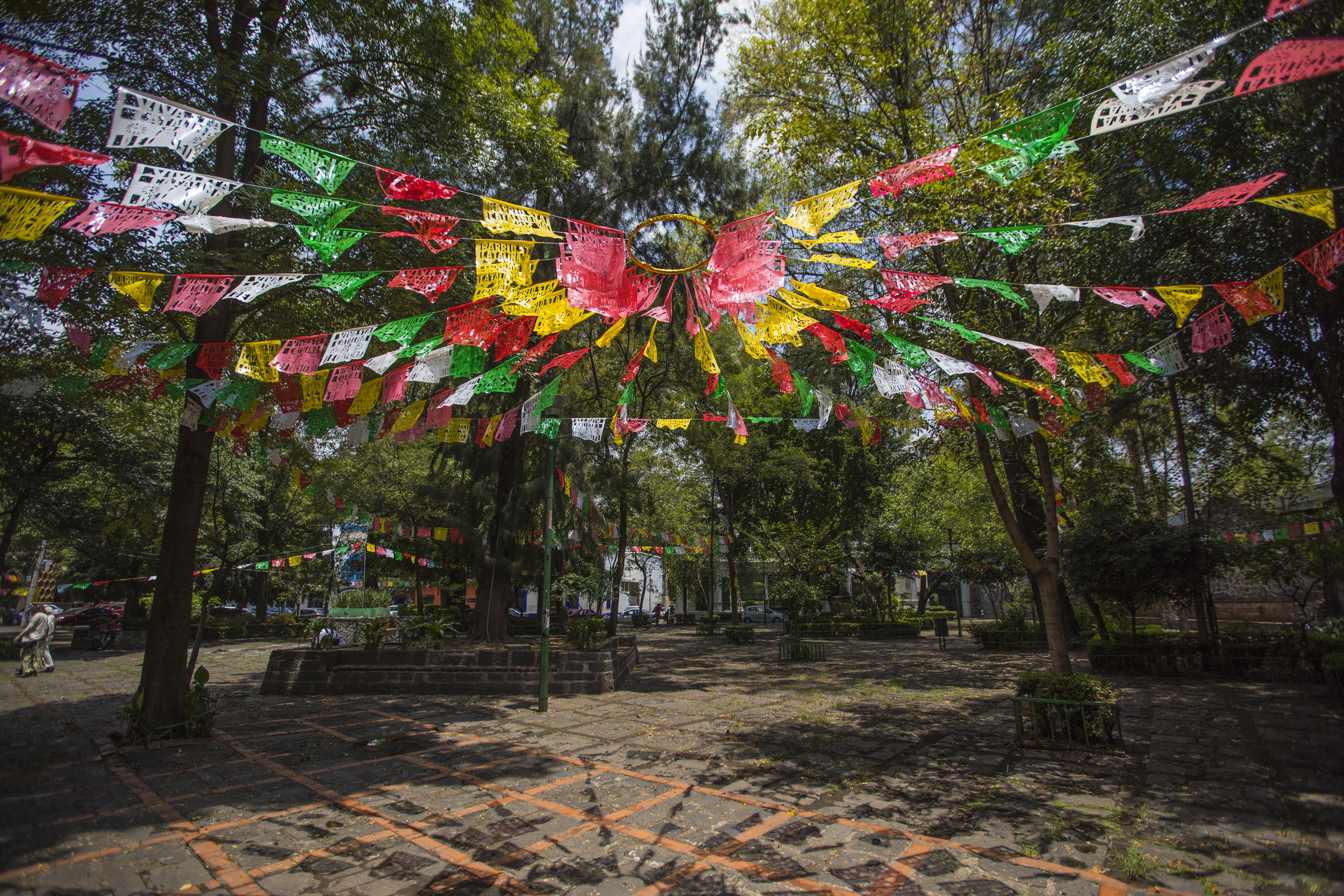
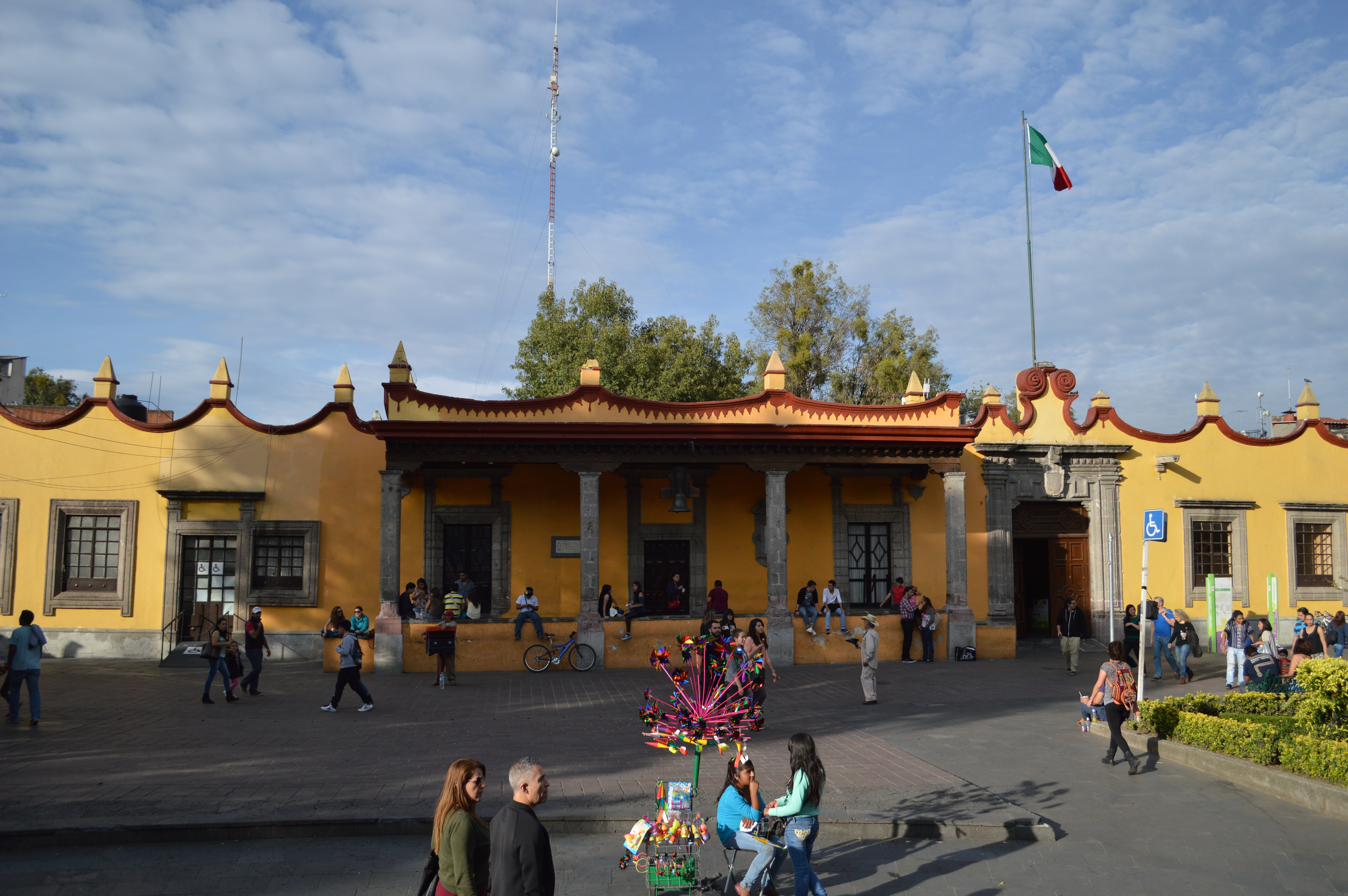
- Top: Coyoacán downtown; Middle: Frida Kahlo Museum, Santo Niño Jesús Chapel; Bottom: Santa Catarina Plaza, Cortés House

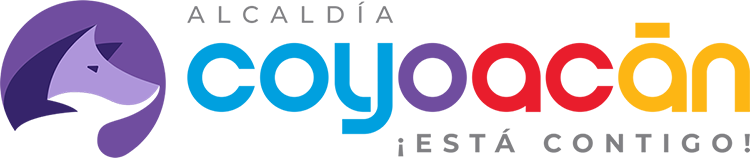
- Seal Logo

- Coyoacán within Mexico City
- Coordinates: 19°21′00″N 99°09′44″W
- Country: Mexico
- Federal entity: Mexico City
- Established: 1928
- Named for: Pre-Columbian city of Coyoacán
- Seat: Jardín Hidalgo No. 1 Col. Villa Coyoacán 04000

Government
  - Mayor: José Giovanni Gutiérrez Aguilar (PAN)
  - Federal electoral districts: CDMX-08 & CDMX-19

Area
  - Total: 54.2 km^{2} (20.9 sq mi)
- Elevation: 2,256 m (7,402 ft)

Population (2020)
  - Total: 614,447
  - Density: 11,300/km^{2} (29,400/sq mi)
- Time zone: UTC-6 (Zona Centro)
- Postal codes: 04000–04980
- Area code: 55
- HDI (2020): ▼0.876 Very High
- Website: www.coyoacan.cdmx.gob.mx

Coyoacán (US: /ˌkɔɪoʊəˈkɑːn/ KOY-oh-ə-KAHN; Spanish: [koʝoaˈkan], Otomí: Ndemiñ'yo) is a borough (demarcación territorial) in Mexico City. The former village became the borough's "historic center". The name comes from Nahuatl Coyōhuahcān, composed of coyōhuah ('one who has coyotes') and -cān ('place'), and therefore means 'place of those who own coyotes', which the Aztecs named a pre-Hispanic village on the southern shore of Lake Texcoco dominated by the Tepanec people. Against Aztec domination, these people allied with the Spanish, who used the area as a headquarters during the Spanish conquest of the Aztec Empire and made it the first capital of New Spain between 1521 and 1523.

The village and later municipality of Coyoacán remained independent of Mexico City through the colonial period into the 19th century. In 1857, the area was incorporated into the then Federal District when this district was expanded. In 1928, the borough was created when the Federal District was divided into sixteen boroughs. The urban expansion of Mexico City reached the borough in the mid-20th century, turning farms, former lakes, and forests into developed areas, but many of the former villages have kept their original layouts, plazas, and narrow streets and have conserved structures built from the 16th to the early 20th centuries. This has made the borough of Coyoacán, especially its historic center, a popular place to visit on weekends.

== Villa Coyoacán or historic center ==
Street map of Villa Coyoacán.

To distinguish it from the rest of Coyoacán borough, the former independent community is referred to as Villa Coyoacán or the historic center of the borough. Consisting now of 29 blocks, it is one of the oldest neighborhoods in Mexico City, located 10 km south of the Zocalo (main square) of Mexico City. This area is filled with narrow cobblestone streets and small plazas, which were laid out during the colonial period, and today give the area a distinct and bohemian identity. The area is filled with mostly single family homes, which were former mansions and country homes built between the colonial period to the mid 20th century. The Project for Public Spaces ranked the neighborhood as one of the best urban spaces to live in North America in 2005 and is the only Mexican neighborhood on the list. This area was designated as a "Barrio Mágico" by the city in 2011.

The center of Coyoacán is relatively peaceful during the week, but it becomes crowded and festive on weekends and holidays. After the Zocalo, the most-visited place in Mexico City is this historic center, especially the twin plazas in its center. According to the borough, the area receives about 70,000 people each weekend. The area is a stop for both the Turibus and Tranvia Turistico tour bus routes, on their routes through San Ángel, Ciudad Universitaria and other locations in the south of Mexico City. People come to enjoy the still somewhat rural atmosphere of the area as well as the large number of restaurants, cafes, cantinas, museums, bookstores and other cultural attractions. Some of these businesses have been around for almost a century. In the two main plazas and even in smaller ones such as the one in the neighboring Santa Catarina neighborhood. Mimes, clowns, musicians, folk and indigenous dancers, storytellers and other street performers can be found entertaining crowds. Vendors sell street food such as ice cream, homemade fruit drinks, esquites (flavored corn kernels) and corn-on-the-cob served with mayonnaise, lime, chili pepper and grated cheese, amaranth bars, and various candies. In the evening, food vendors tend to sell more hot items such as quesadillas, sopes, tortas, tostadas, pozoles and more.

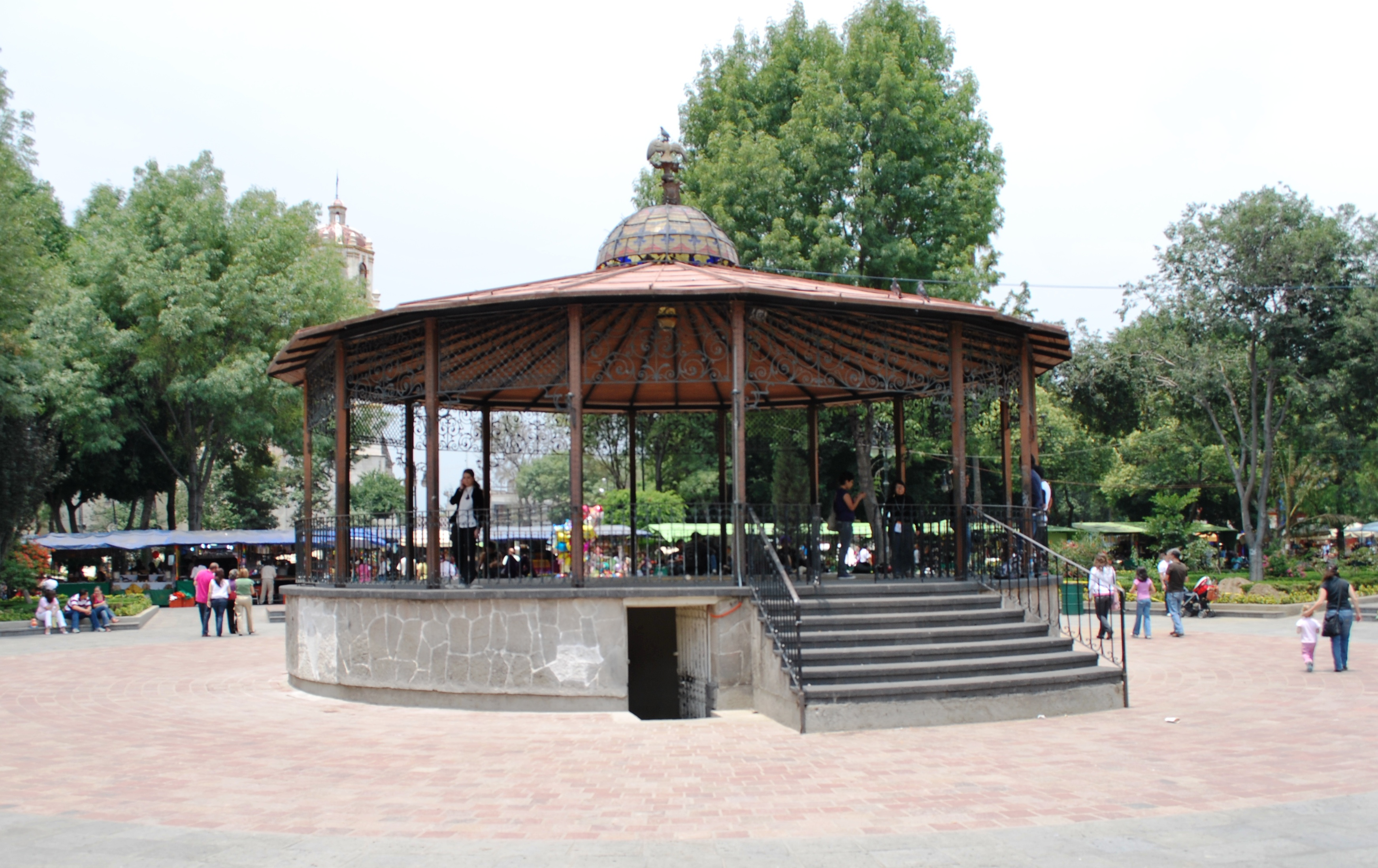
Kiosk in Plaza Hidalgo

The tourism has been a mixed blessing for the historic center as commercial establishments open, helping the economy, but also push residents out. In the historic center, there are over 860 retail businesses, mostly restaurants, about 200 of which were established in the last five years. Residents attribute the growth to Mexico City's promotion of the area tourism in general as well as the opening of commercial centers in the borough. While the growing business helps the economy, resident groups fear that the area will lose its current character, as many businesses are opening in formerly residential buildings, with questionable legal basis. Currently, most of the borough, especially in historic center, is residential with older adults. Property prices are high, leading to sales not to new families but rather to larger commercial interests, squeezing out smaller businesses along with residents. Neighborhood groups have formed to confront the changes and preserve the historic value of the area. Another serious problem for the area is the traffic jams and serious lack of parking in the historic center. The quantity of cars and the lack of traffic patrols have meant the proliferation of “franeleros” or people who illegally take possession of public areas such as streets to charge for parking.

=== Jardin del Centenario ===
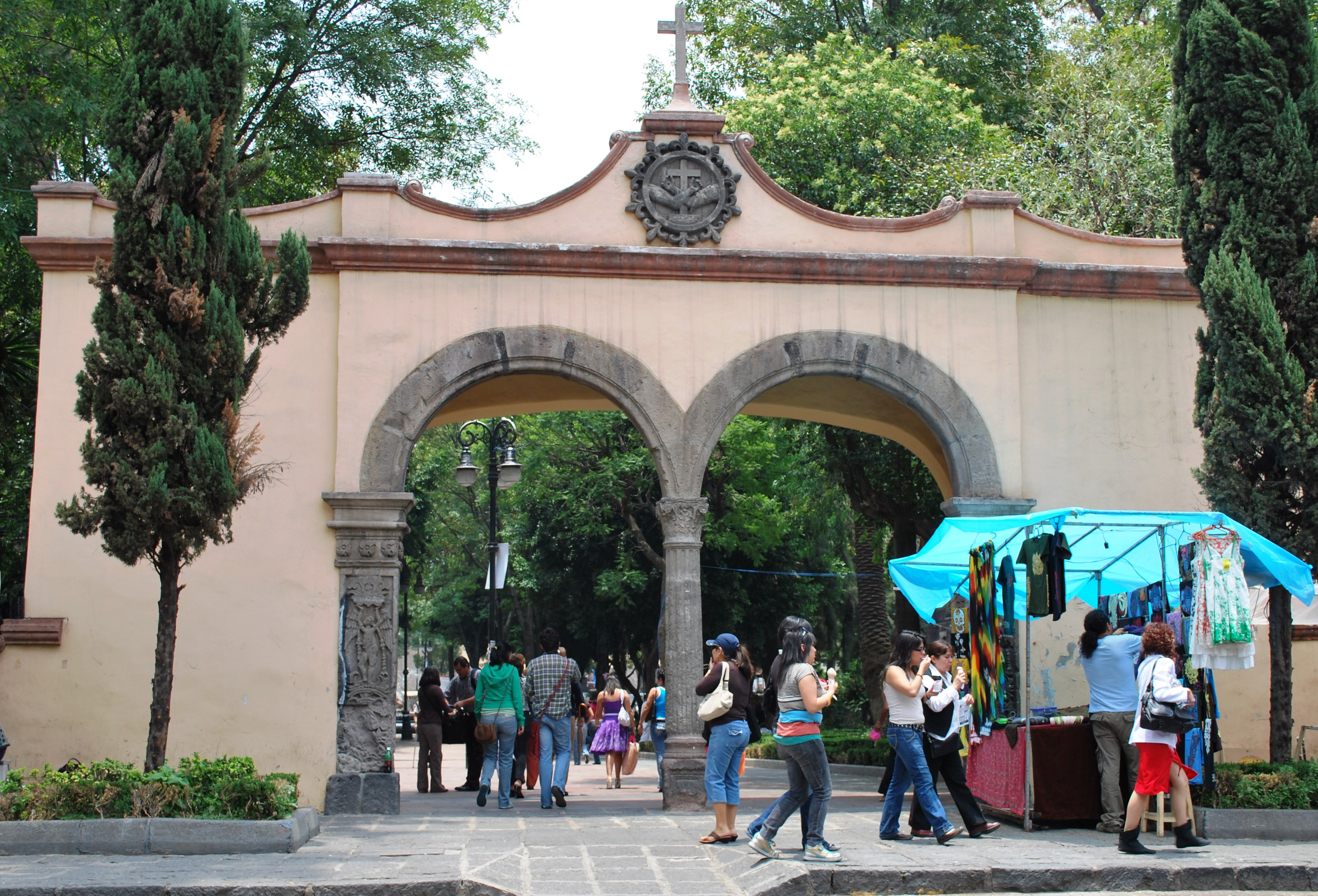
Arcos del Jardín del Centenario

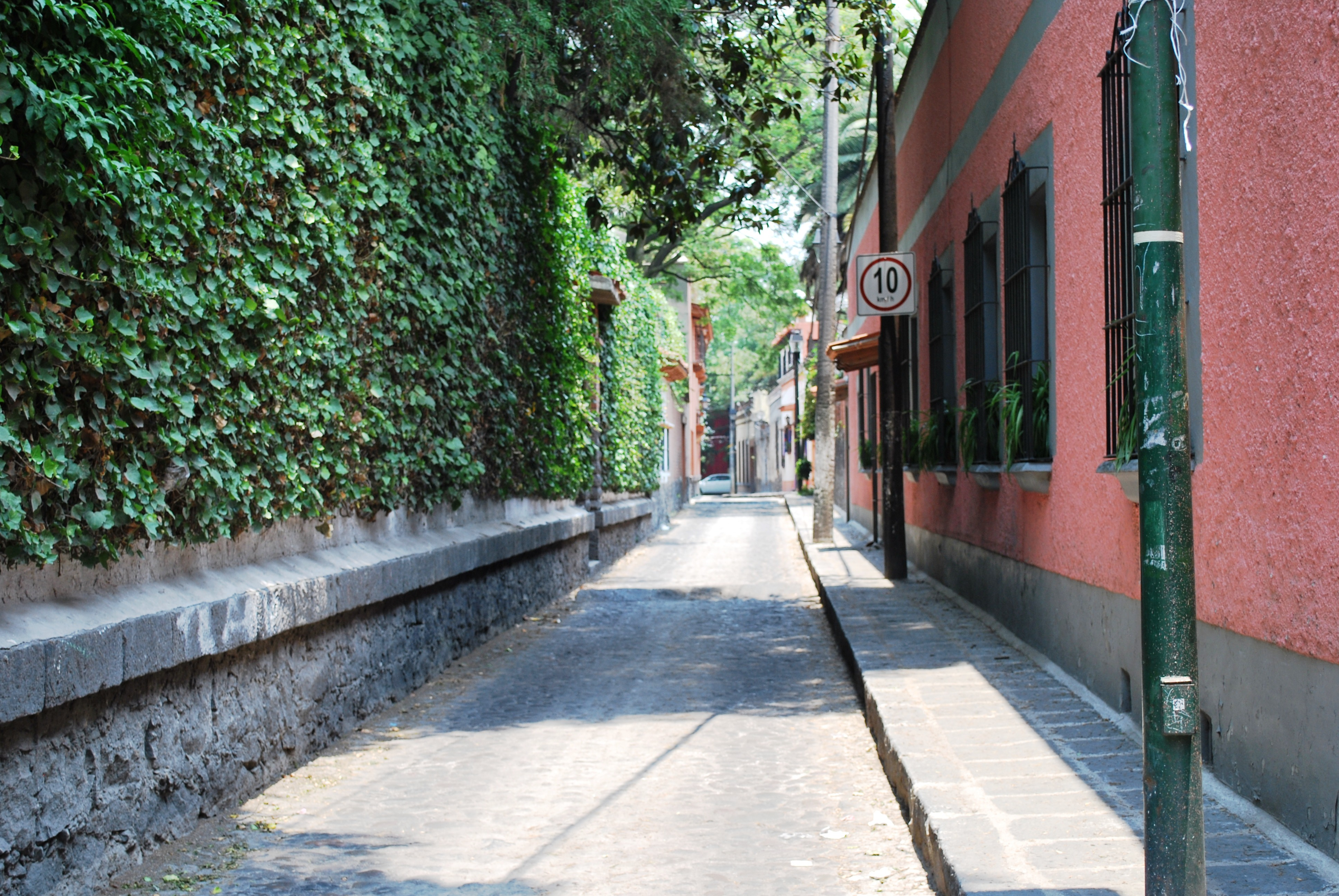
A street in Coyoacán

The historic area is centered on two large plazas filled with Indian laurel trees called the Jardin del Centenario and the Jardín Hidalgo. These plazas cover an area of 24,000 square metres (260,000 ft^{2}; 2.4 ha), which were renovated, along with the areas around them in 2008. The green areas were rehabilitated, and areas were paved with red and black volcanic stone. Renovation of the two plazas and the streets around them cost 88.3 million pesos. For over twenty five years, these plazas, especially Plaza Hidalgo, and the streets around them were filled with vendors (wandering and with stalls). When renovation efforts began, 150 vendors were removed from the plazas proper with about 500 total including the surrounding streets. While the practice was illegal, it had been tolerated by authorities, even though it caused damage to the plazas and caused traffic problems. One of the main goals of the renovation work in 2008 was to remove these vendors and move them to a new crafts bazaar built nearby. Initially, opposition to the removal of the vendors came not only from the vendors themselves, but also from some neighborhood groups and local businesses who feared their removal would hurt tourism. When renovation work finished in 2009, police were assigned to the plazas to keep vendors from returning, leading to confrontations, both physically in the plazas and legally in the courts. The borough began to issue some permits for vendors, but there was opposition. Eventually, a group representing the vendors obtained a court order to allow forty vendors to return to the plazas, citing the history of tolerating such activity in the past. This order is still opposed by some neighborhood groups, but as of 2010, there are still a limited number of these vendors selling in the plazas.

=== Plaza Hidalgo ===
Plaza Hidalgo, also called Jardín (garden) Hidalgo is the main plaza or square of the borough. It is bordered by Calle Carillo Puerto on the east, Calle Caballocalco on the west, Calle B. Dominguez and the Casa Municipal on the north and the Plaza del Centenario and the Parish is San Juan Bautista on the south. In the center of the plaza, there is an early 20th-century kiosk with a stained glass cupola topped by a bronze eagle. This kiosk was donated to the then village by Porfirio Díaz for the then-upcoming Centennial of Mexico's Independence in 1910. The eagle design is one adopted by Mexico after the French Intervention. As the plaza is named after Miguel Hidalgo y Costilla, a statue of the priest, created by Luis Arias can also be found on the plaza. Behind it is a sculpture carved from a tree trunk called “La Familia de Antonio Alvarez Portual y Josué.

=== Plaza del Centenario ===
The Plaza del Centenario (also called the Jardín del Centenario) is slightly smaller and located just west of the Plaza Hidalgo, separated by Calle Carrillo Puerto. This plaza originally was part of the very large atrium that belonged to Parish of San Juan Bautista during the colonial period. The main entrance to this atrium still exist on the west side of this plaza and are called the Arcadas Atrial or the Arcos del Jardín del Centenario. This entrance was built in the 16th century of stone with decorative motifs that show both European and indigenous influence. The current name for this area comes from the Centennial of Mexico's Independence. In the center of the plaza, there is a fountain which contains a bronze sculpture of two coyotes, which refer to the borough's name. The south side of the plaza is lined with cafes and restaurants, including the well-known Café El Parnaso, and the north side features a very large crafts market.

=== Casa Municipal (Casa de Cortés) ===
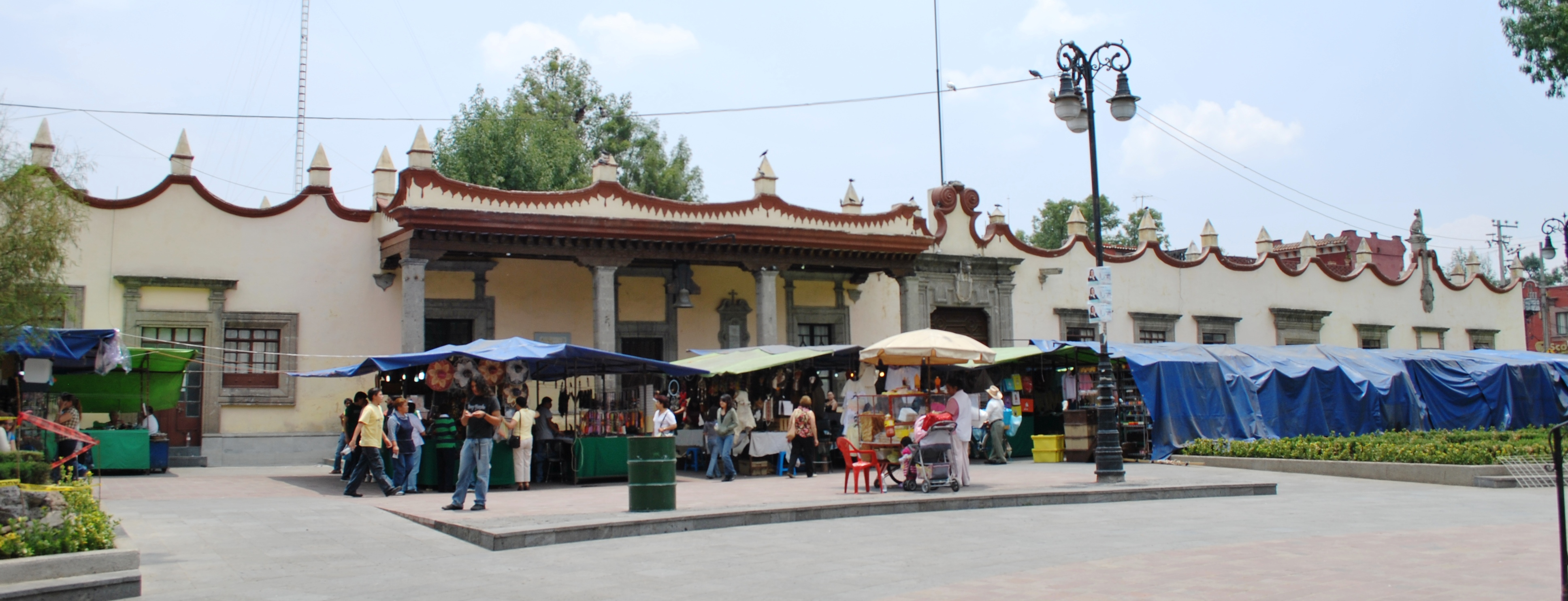
Casa Municipal

The Casa Municipal, also referred to La Casa de Cortés, is a building located on the north side of the Plaza Hidalgo. It has served as an administrative/governmental building since it was constructed in the 18th century. The erroneous name of Casa de Cortés (House of Cortés, referring to Hernán Cortés), comes from Coyoacán's association with the conquistador. Cortés did live in Coyoacán in 1521 and 1522, while the destroyed Aztec city of Tenochtitlan was being rebuilt into Mexico City, and the area was the capital of the colony of New Spain. However, Cortés never lived at the site, despite a plaque on building that says that he did. Cortés residence in Coyoacán was on lands that belonged to the then leader of the indigenous of this area, Juan de Guzmán Iztolinque, in the area where the La Conchita Church and plaza are found now. What Cortés eventually built here were administrative buildings for the offices used to manage the vast lands he was granted as the Marquis del Valle de Oaxaca, which included the Coyoacán area. Local legend states that this was the location were Cuauhtémoc was tortured as the Spanish tried to learn of the whereabouts of more treasure.

The current structure was built in the mid 18th century, by Cortés’ descendants (who still carried the title of the Marquis of the Valle de Oaxaca) to replace the old structure, which had deteriorated. In the 1850s, the building began to be used as the seat of the government of the municipality of Coyoacán, which then belonged to the State of Mexico, very separate from Mexico City. When the borough of Coyoacán was created in 1928, as part of the Federal District, the building remained the government seat but of the modern “delegación.” The structure was declared a Colonial Monument by INAH in 1932.

The structure is much the same as it was when it was constructed in the 18th century. The facade is simple and is fronted by a series of columns in sandstone and wood over which is a roof. The door and window jambs are typical of civil constructions of the 18th century with wrought iron work. The facade is topped by a wide cornice and inverted arches. At the very front is a sculpture of two coyotes in volcanic stone, the current logo of the borough. Above the entrance is the coat of arms granted to Coyoacán by Charles IV of Spain. On one side of the building is the Sala de Cabildos, or City Council Hall. It was painted by Aurora Reyes Flores with a mural depicting pre-Hispanic Coyoacán and includes depictions of the landscape of the area including the Xitle volcano, the Tepaneca god Xocotlhuetzin as well as the Mesoamerican deity Quetzalcoatl. Next to this hall is an attached chapel. The mural in the chapel was done by Diego Rosales in 1961, depicting the early history of Mexico with personages such as Cuauhtémoc, Cortés, La Malinche and Pedro de Alvarado. Scenes of the work cover the walls and the ceiling.

=== Parish of San Juan Bautista ===
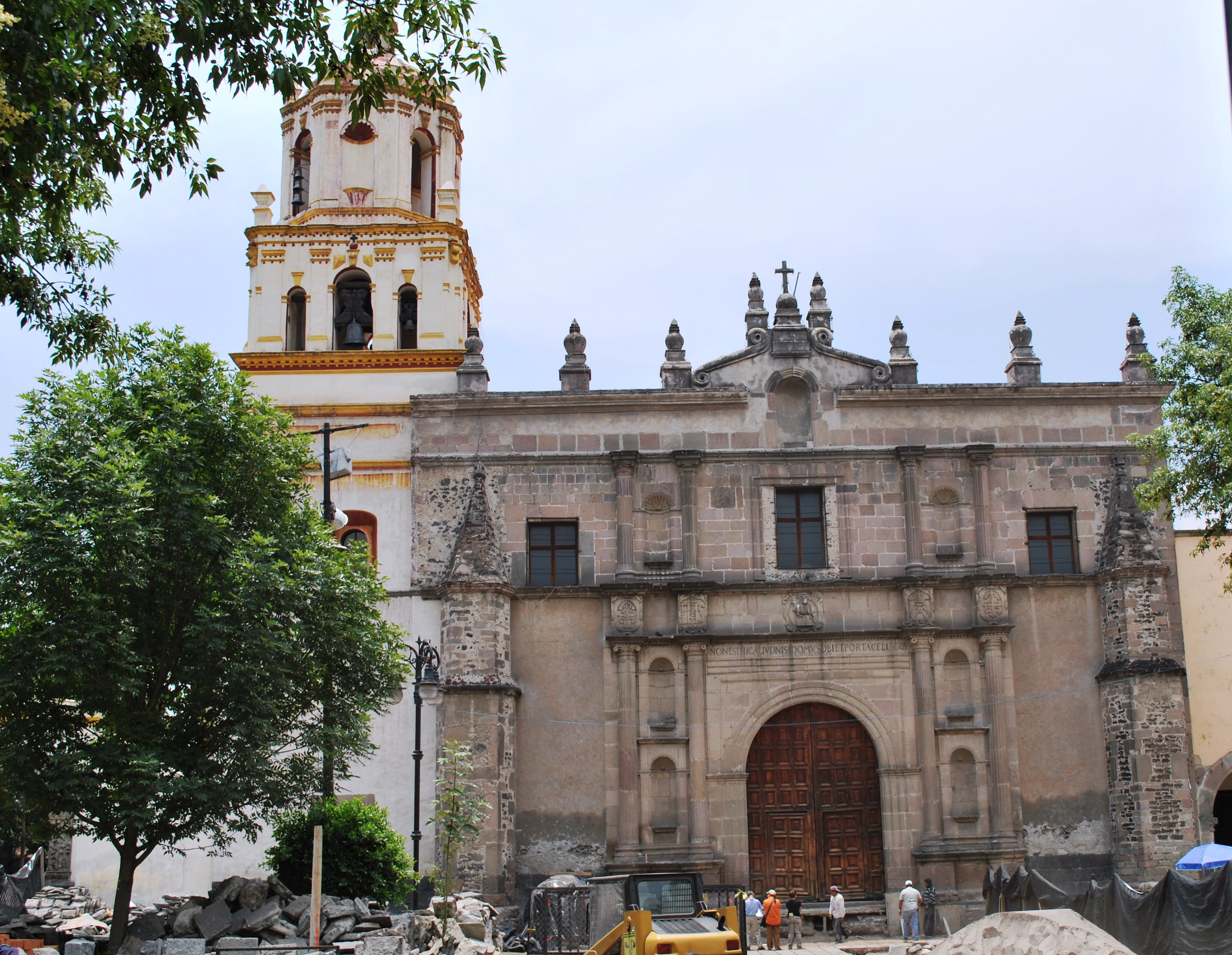
Parish of San Juan Bautista

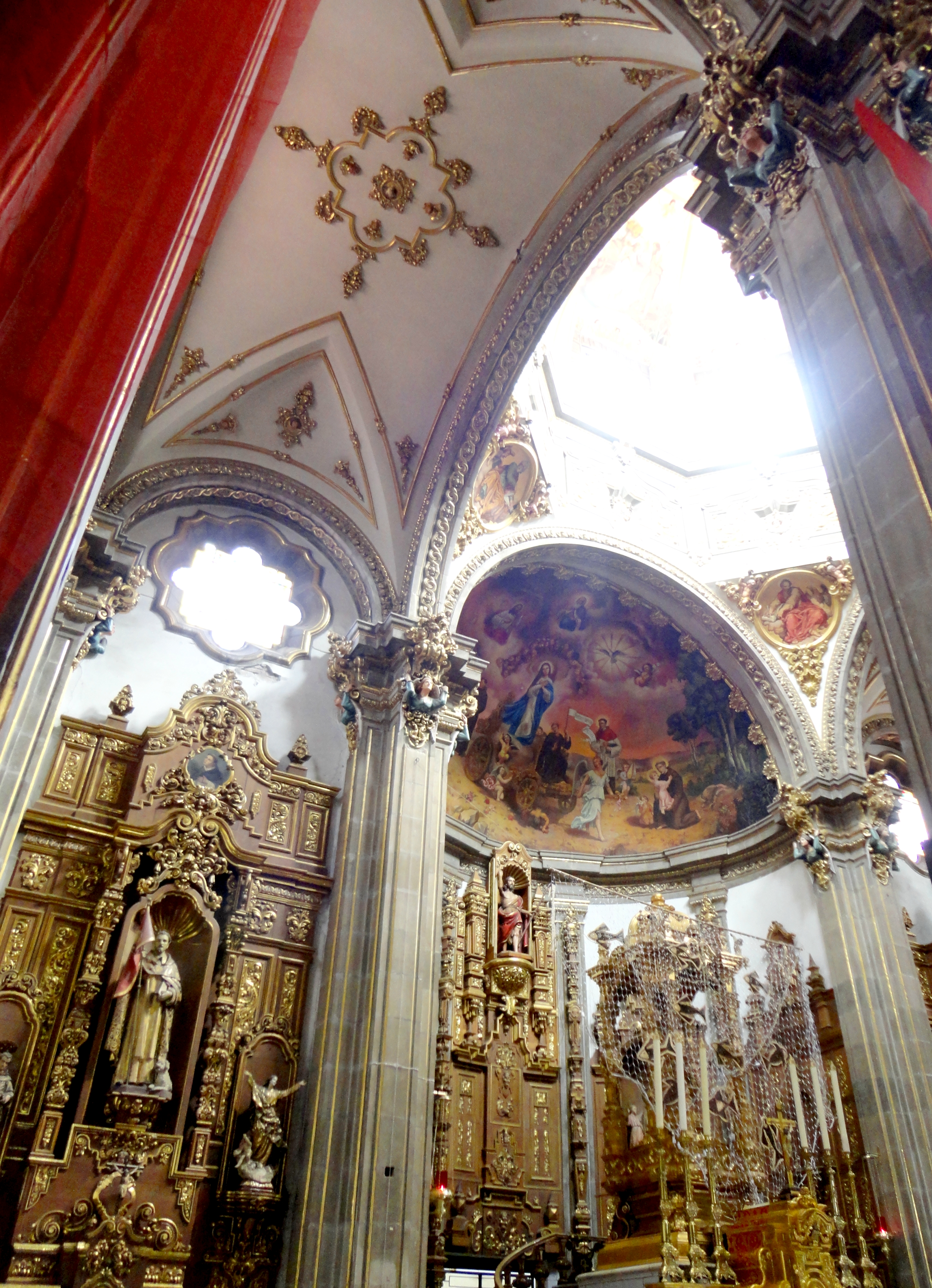
Inside the Parish of San Juan Bautista

One of the most important historic buildings in the borough is the Parish of San Juan Bautista. Built between 1520 and 1552, it is one of three oldest parish churches in Mexico City, along with the ones in Tlalpan and the small community of Amaqueman. Originally, this church and the cloister next to it were constructed as a monastery by the Dominicans, but the complex was transferred to the Franciscans. Over time, as the complex deteriorated and was reconstructed and restored various time, most was replaced so that now the only original parts from the 16th century are the choir area, the Rosario Chapel and the main altar. However, much of the same layout remains. The parish church has a large open chapel, but only a portion of the atrium it had in the 16th century. During much of the colonial period, the atrium functioned as a cemetery. Today, much of this atrium is now the Plaza del Centenario. The interior of the church has seven chapels, with the Rosario Chapel containing an ornate Baroque altarpiece from the end of the 17th century. The monastery portion is two floors surrounding a large inner courtyard. It conserves a large part of the original wood beams and decorative work in wood which was done by indigenous hands. The feast day for San Juan Bautista is 24 June. In the church a special altar is installed and mass is said all day. The most important mass occurs at midday with mariachi music, with a meal offered in the adjoining monastery building. The event is organized by 24 civil associations and the chaplains of the parish.

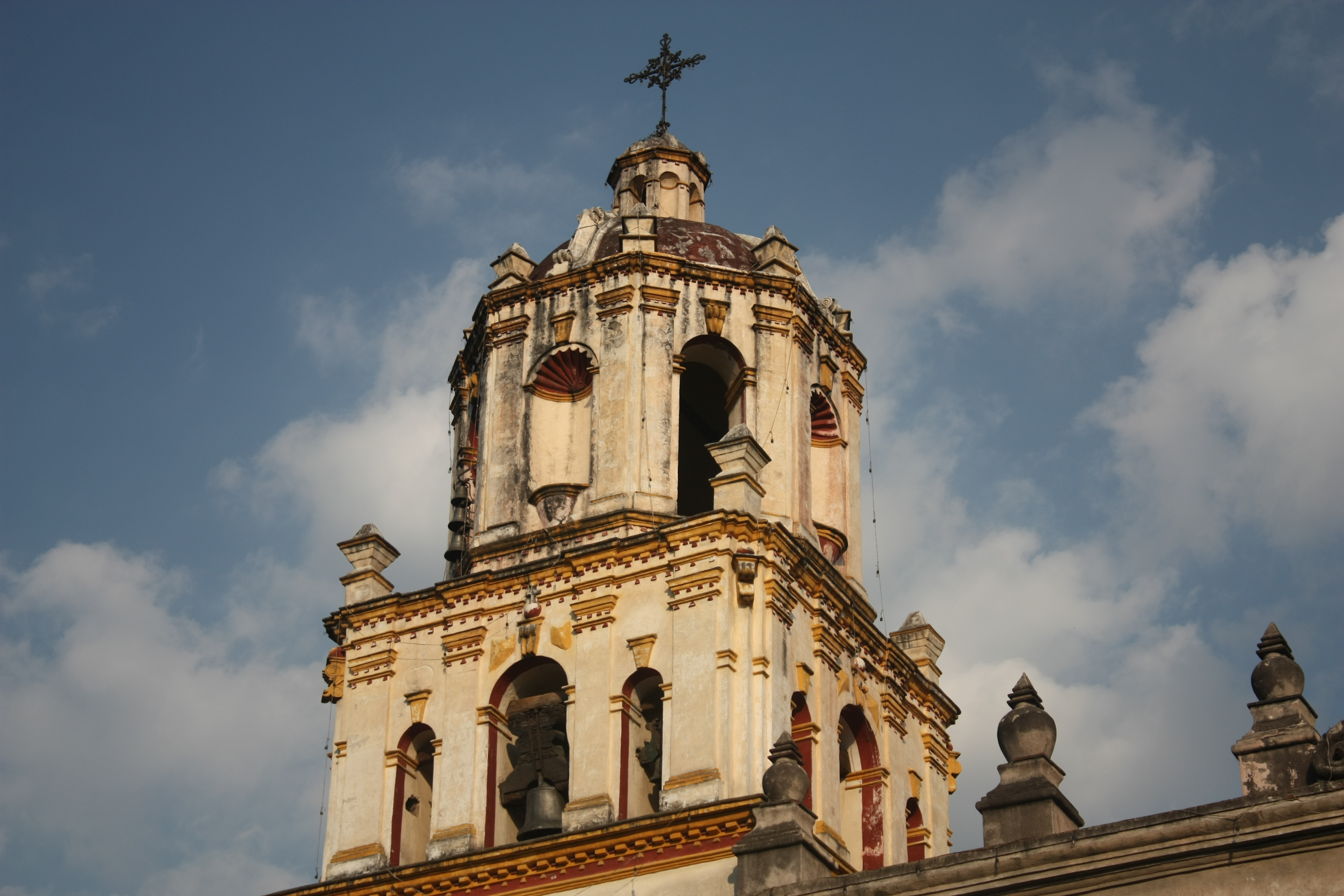

In 2005, the San Juan Bautista church underwent renovations to its tower, atrium, facade, portal for pilgrims, the north and south sides and the cupola and more under the supervision of INAH and academics from UNAM. Prior to this, there had been no restoration work to the building for about a century. The cupola was particularly damaged, with trees and other plants growing out of it. Much of the work was to make straight many of the walls and floors, which had cracked and warped. Studies were done on the building to determine what materials in what colors were used in order to use the same. It was declared a National Monument in 1934. The work was sponsored by government and private funds.

=== Museo Nacional de Culturas Populares ===
Another landmark off the plazas is the Museo Nacional de Culturas Populares. The museum is located just off the Plaza del Centenario, and features mostly temporary exhibits related to popular or mass culture such as one related to lucha libre wrestling. The museum was created in 1982, to show the values and ways of live of the various modern cultural groups in Mexico. It has various halls, an auditorium and two courtyards in which are exhibitions, auditions, concerts, plays, recitals and craft workshops for children.

The rest of the historic center and nearby neighborhoods are filled with homes built from the colonia era to the middle of the 20th century, many of which have been catalogued for their historic value. Many of these homes can be found one two of the historic center's oldest streets, the Calle de Higuera, which leads southeast away from the Parish of San Juan Miguel and to the La Concepción neighborhood and Calle Francisco Sosa, which leads away from the same area towards San Angel. Calle Francisco Sosa alone has 65 structures catalogued by INAH for their historic value. One of the most important of these structures is the Casa de Ordaz, located on Calle Francisco Sosa on the corner with the Plaza de Centenario.) It was long thought to have belonged to conquistador Diego de Ordaz, who died in 1532, but research has shown that it was built sometime in the 18th century. Remodeling work was authorized on the Casa de Ordaz in 2004 by the INAH, but complaint stated that the owner, Banamex, gutted the interior and exceeded the limits set for the work by INAH. However, the chronicler of the borough, Luis Everaert, stated that the only original part of the building was the facade, which was not changed. The house underwent modification in the 1930s. In the 1920s, it was a school for girls, the first in Coyoacán, In the 1930s, it was the Instituto Centroamericano, a middle school for boys. The Instituto Italiano de Cultura (Italian Cultural Institute) on Francisco Sosa Street is house in a structure built between the 17th and 18th centuries and remodeled in the 20th. This structure is an adobe and stone mansion with a flat red façade with Moorish style decorative features. It has an inner courtyard with a tile decorated fountain and a private altar. It houses the cultural offices of the Italian Embassy. The main house of the San Pedro Martír Hacienda is located off of Belisario Dominguez Street. The house is now divided into three independent parts, but they retain their original facades. In 1932, this house was where the Escuela de Pintura al Aire Libre (Open Air Painting School) was established, which was an important artistic movement.

== The borough ==
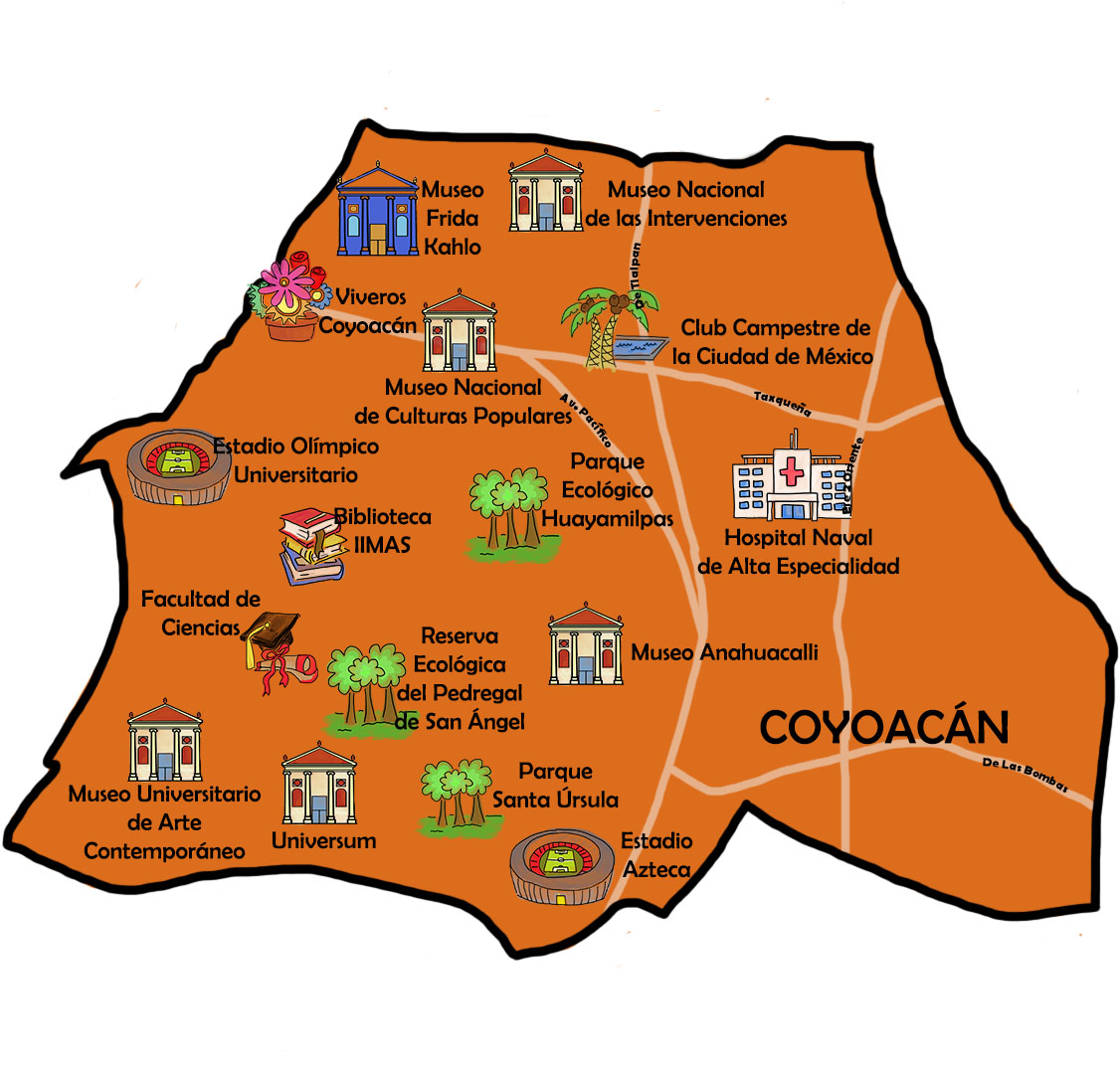
Tourist map of the borough

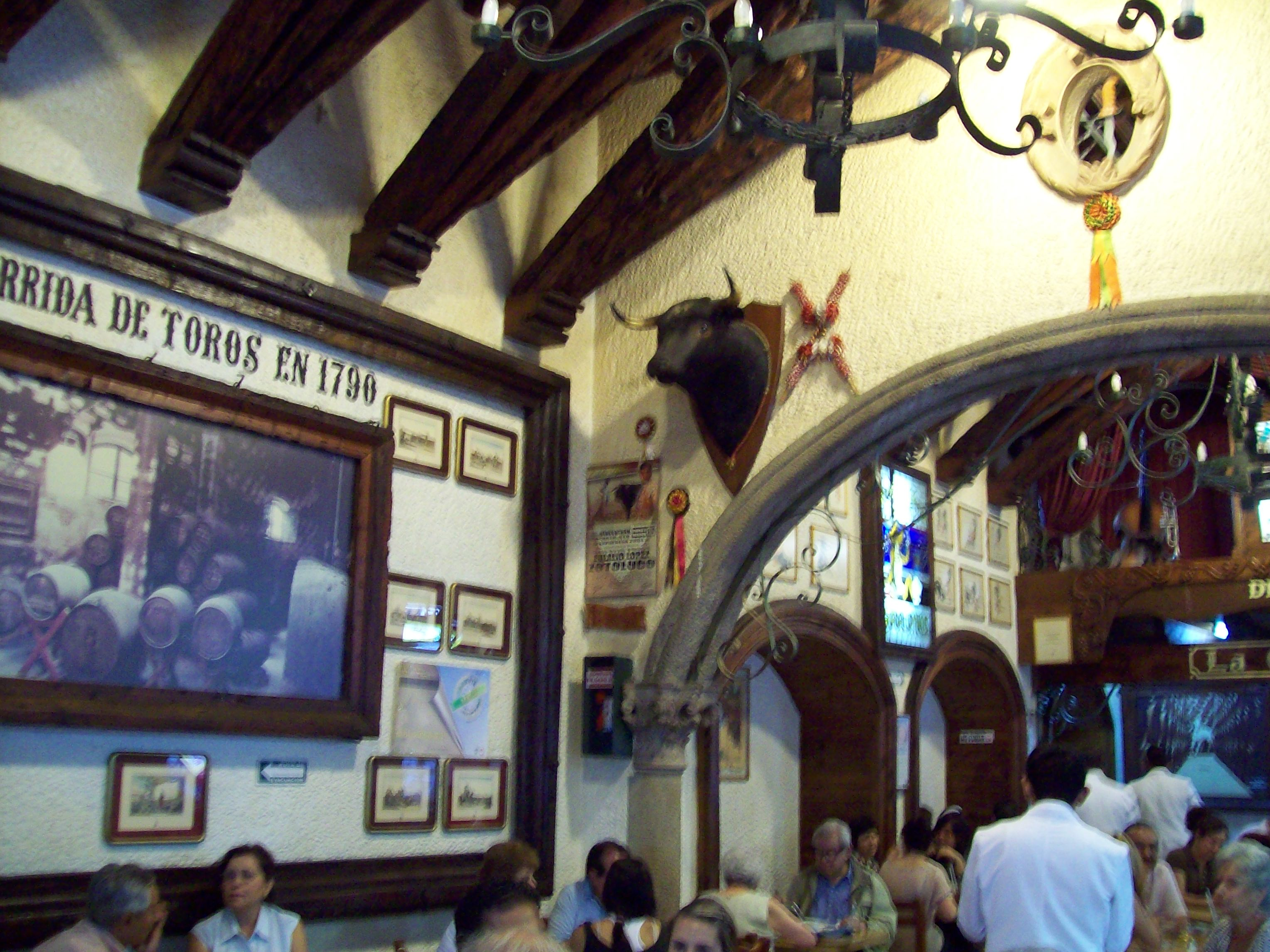
Cantina in Coyoacán

The borough of Coyoacán was created in 1928, when the Federal District of Mexico City was divided into 16 administrative parts. The borough is named after the old village of Coyoacán, where the borough government is seated. This borough is much larger than the village, extending for 54.4 square kilometres (21.0 sq mi) in the geographic center of the Federal District. Accounting for 3.6% of the Federal District, it is the tenth largest borough. The borough is bordered to the north by the boroughs of Benito Juárez, Iztapalapa, Xochimilco, Tlalpan and Álvaro Obregón. Border roads include Avenida Río Churubusco, Calzada Ermita Iztapalapa, Calzada de la Viga, Canal Nacional, Calzada del Hueso, Avenida del Bordo, Calzado Acoxpa, Calzada de Tlalpan, Avenida de Pedregal, Anillo Periférico, Boulevard de las Cataratas, Circuito Universitario, Avenida Ciudad Universitaria, San Jerónimo, Río Magdalena and Avenida Universidad.

Sixty-nine percent of the land is residential, 60% is open or green space and the rest is mixed use or commercial. The borough contains 167,157 housing units with between two and four occupants, which is 7.5% of the total of the District. It contains 7.2% of the total population of the Federal District. This population has fallen slightly from 640,423 to 628,063 (2000 to 2005) as the overall population of Mexico City has risen.

However, quality of life in this borough his ranked among the top in the nation and has been ranked internationally. Coyoacán was ranked third best place to live in the country in 2004 by the United Nations Development Programme, behind Benito Juarez and San Pedro Garza García in Nuevo León. The ranking is based on income levels, health and education. Coyoacán was ranked sixth in education, fourth in income and fifth in health. In quality of life, which takes into account factors such as crime statistics, Coyoacán ranked second behind Benito Juarez in Mexico City. This ranks the quality of life as equivalent to that in developed countries. In 2004, Coyoacán was ranked the fifth most livable neighborhood in North America, ahead of Rittenhouse, Philadelphia and behind Camden, Maine. The borough contains 228 preschools, 227 primary schools, 103 middle schools, and 66 technical, preparatory and other high schools serving about 155,000 students. Illiteracy is lower here than in the rest of the Federal District at 1.9% for residents over the age of 15. About 55% of the population is of working age with less than 2% unemployed. 77.8% are employed in commerce and services, with 7% in industry; 44.8% of industrial jobs is related to pharmaceuticals with food processing accounting for 18.7%. However, industry accounts for 47.3% of the borough GDP, followed by services at 32.6% and commerce at 16.7%. As of 2004, the borough accounted for 4.1% of Mexico City's total GDP, but its industry accounts for 21% of industrial GDP. Tourism is an important part of the borough commerce and services sector. However, there are only nine hotels rated with three stars or above.

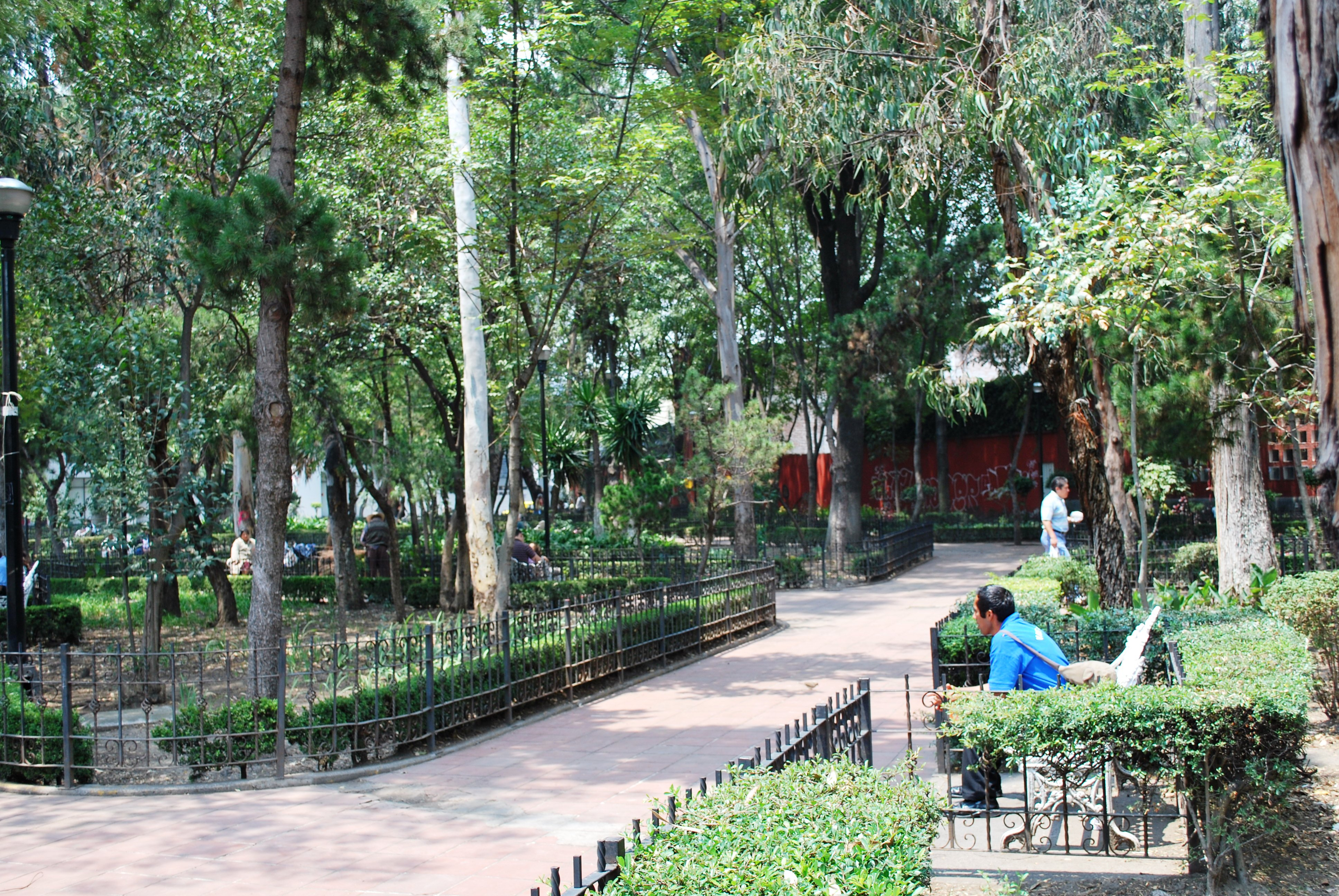
Allende Park

Most of the borough located at 2,240 meters (7,350 ft) above sea level with little variation. Minor elevations are located in Ciudad Universitaria, San Francisco Culuacán and Santa Úrusula Coapa. The most important elevation is in the far south called the Cerro Zacatépetl which rises to 2,420 metres (7,940 ft) above sea level. Parks and other green spaces cover 4,318,783.56 square metres (432 ha; 1,067 acres) and can be found in most of the communities of the borough. Soil composition is of two types, of volcanic origin and the former lakebed of Lake Texcoco. Volcanic land is subdivided by volcanic rock which is decomposing and that which has not. The best known of the areas with still-hard lava rock is called the Pedregal, which covers the communities of the Ciudad Universitaria, the Pedregal de Carrasco, Santa Úrsula Coapa, Copilco el Alto, Viveros de Coyocan and the Villa de Coyoacán or historic center. The southeast of the borough is dominated by volcanic rock from an eruption of a now dormant volcano called Xitle. This lava bed covers the current communities of Colonia Santo Domingo, Colonia Ajusco and Pueblo de Santa Úrsula. Decomposing volcanic rock is mostly found by the former lake. The borough is part of the Pánuco River Basin, in the subregion of the Lake Texcoco Zumpango. The lake no longer exists except for a canal called the Canal Nacional which is on the east border. Two rivers pass through the territory called the Río Magdalena and Río Mixcoac. Both of these are almost fully encased in cement tubes as they pass through. These two rivers join to form the Río Churubusco on the border with Benito Juárez.

The borough is divided into 140 communities, classified as colonias, pueblos, unidades habitacionales and barrios. The oldest of these divisions are former villages which are distinguished by their colonial era churches and who still celebrate their feast of their patron saint much as they did when they were independent, with fireworks, masses, processions, folk and indigenous dance and more. A number of these villages also have certain unique traditions associated with these celebrations. These barrios and pueblos can still be somewhat distinguished by their narrow, winding roads and alleyways. Culturally, they are still distinguished by having their own histories and legends. Many of the old villages are linked by the old Calle Real, which was renamed Santa Catarina, then Benito Juarez and now Francisco Sosa. Today, this road extends from Plaza or Jardín Hidalgo to the Panzacola Bridge. This street used to have a trolley car that linked the historic center of Coyoacán with San Ángel and Churubusco. At first this trolley was pulled by mules, but later it was electrified. Sometime after that, it was replaced by modern busses. Another main road in the borough is La Higuera, which links Plaza Hidalgo which the La Conchita Plaza.

In additions to structures from the colonial era, Coyoacán has important structure from the 19th century, replicas of colonial and 19th century buildings constructed in the 20th century and modern buildings. In total, the borough contains 349 registered buildings of cultural or historic importance, with 157 of these in the historic center. Coyoacán was declared a “Zona Típica y Pintoresca del Distrito Federal” (Typical and Picturesque Zone of the Federal District) by INAH in 1934 due to is historical, cultural and artistic value. This declaration recognizes 278 buildings within the borough. This historic center has the most with fifty buildings on 86 blocks over 1.64 square kilometres (0.63 sq mi).

Despite its rural past with villages and farmlands, today the borough is urban, with all of its territory paved and developed with the exception of parks and other reserved green spaces as it is completely integrated with the urban sprawl of Mexico City. This has brought a number of problems to the area. Traffic in Coyoacán is some of the worst in the city. While there are 70.7 km of primary roads through the borough, with 8,200,947 square metres (88,274,260 sq ft) of pavement, many sections have maintained the narrow winding streets and plazas from its colonial past. These sections bring in a large number of visitors, especially on weekends and holidays, with these roads unable to cope with the volume of traffic and need for parking. Other issues are graffiti and vandalism, and other crimes, the most serious of which is theft/robbery, followed by assault. However, Coyoacán generates only 7.2% of all crime reports in Mexico City.

== Other neighborhoods of the borough ==
For long before it became a borough, the area was home to a number of small community and villages. Vestiges of a number of these communities can still be distinguished by street layouts and by customs and traditions which have survived. Many of the old villages, now called colonias, pueblos and barrios (roughly “neighborhood”) are linked by the old Calle Real, which was renamed Santa Catarina, then Benito Juarez and now Francisco Sosa. Today, this road extends from Plaza Hidalgo to the Panzacola Bridge in Santa Catarina. This street used to have a trolley car that linked the historic center of Coyoacán with San Ángel and Churubusco. At first this trolley was pulled by mules, but later it was electrified. Sometime after that, it was replaced by modern busses. Another main road in the borough is La Higuera, which links Plaza Hidalgo which the La Conchita Plaza in the La Concepción neighborhood. These two roads, along with other colonial-era roads still have structures which are centuries old. Another street with a number of country mansions and homes is Calle de Fernandez Leal, mostly built at the beginning of the 20th century. A film called “The Matador, with Pierce Brosnan and Greg Kinnear was filmed partly on the Plaza Santa Catarina.

=== La Concepción ===
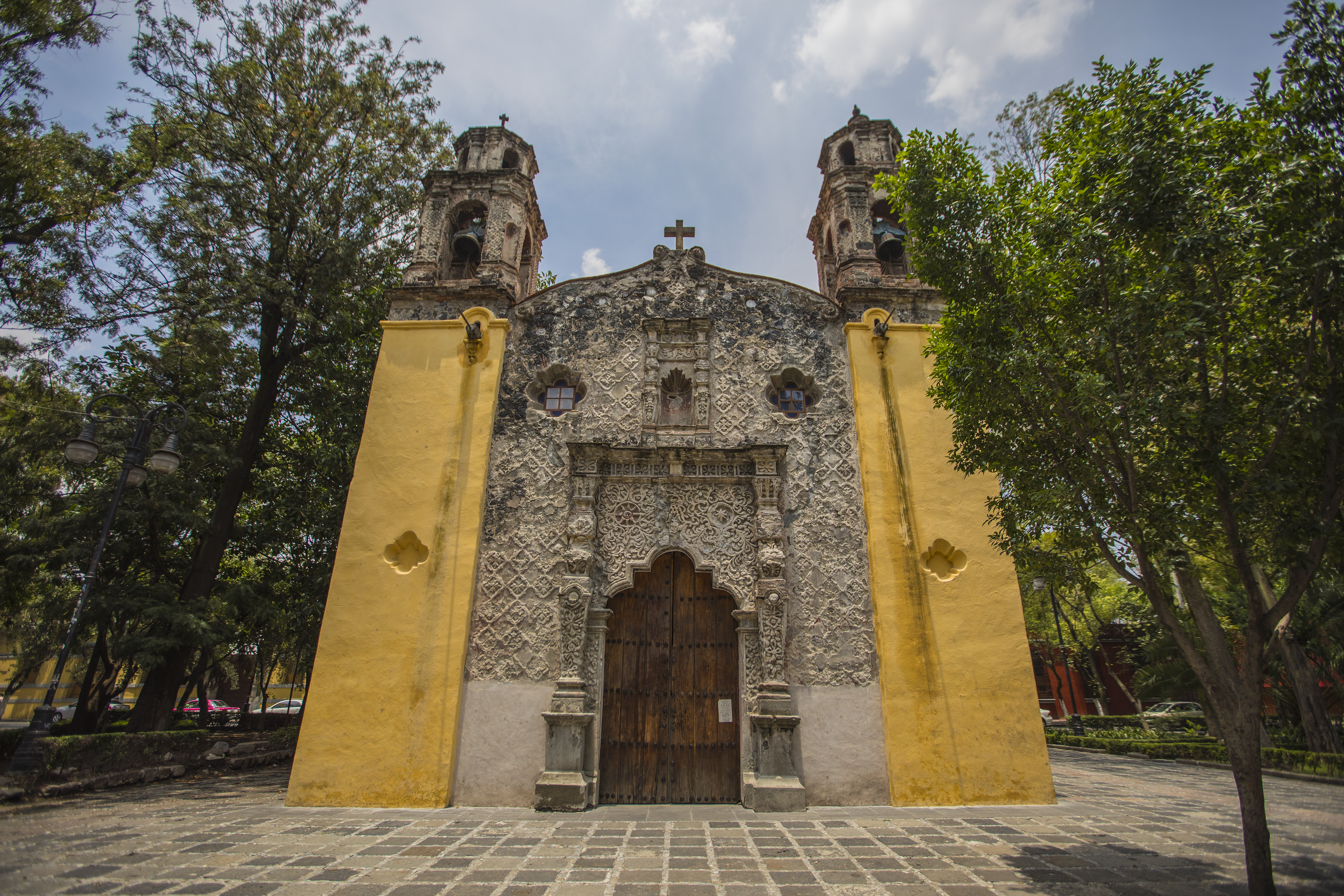
"La Conchita" church in La Concepción

One neighborhood which is as old as the historic center is the La Concepción or La Conchita neighborhood (Barrio de la Concepción), an area where the Spanish conquistadors settled in the 1520s. The neighborhood centers on a small plaza with a church just southeast of Villa Coyoacán or the historic center. This main chapel and plaza are called the Purísima Concepción Chapel and the Plaza de la Conchita. This plaza is surrounded by very small streams still fed by a spring called Los Camilos. It is thought that Los Camilos once provided potable water to Tenochitlan. According to INAH, the plaza was a pre-Hispanic ceremonial center, upon which Cortés had this chapel built. The first Catholic mass in Mexico City was celebrated here and according to tradition, Hernán Cortés’ lover and translator, La Malinche, prayed here. The official name of the building is the Purísima Concepción Chapel, but its more common name is La Conchita, a nickname for “Concepción” (literally, “the little shell”).

The feast day for this neighborhood is 8 December. The façade of the La Conchita Church is decorated with a large flower portal, usually donated by a sister community of Coyoacán such as Los Reyes or La Candelaria. The festival begins with chamber music and then the patron image of the Virgin Mary is “awakened” with the song Las Mañanitas as she is surrounded by numerous floral arrangements for mass. On the plaza in front of the church, wind bands play while participants share tamales and atole. Later in the night, student musical groups perform callejoneadas where they roam the streets playing music as a traveling party.

Most of the area's oldest buildings are located on this plaza, Calle Fernando Sosa, which leads to Villa Coyoacán and Calle Fernandez Leal. The Casa Colorada or Casa de la Malinche is located on a corner of the Plaza La Conchita, but it is not open to the public. It is said that Cortés built it for La Malinche, and historians believe Cortés had his Spanish wife, Catalina Juárez de Marcaida, murdered there. In spite of the house's historic and aesthetic value, it receives little attention. The reason for this is that La Malinche is often blamed for the downfall of the Aztec Empire, acting as a traitor to her own people.

La Casa de los Padres Camilos (The House of the Camillo Priests) is on Calle Fernandez Leal in the Barrio de la Concepción. This structure was part of a farm and hospice which was owned by a Camillian religious order. The brothers cultivated a number of crops including fruit trees and flowers. Today the main house is used for commercial purposes but the building retains many of its original architectural details. It is a small stone-block building with a door made of black stone. A hall was added in the early 1900s. Opposite the Casa de los Camilos is the Jardín Frida Kahlo which has a statue of the painter and a fountain.

On Calle Fernández Leal you can also find the Elena Garro Cultural Center. Since its inauguration, on October 5, 2012, this space was conceived as a project of community life around books and a permanent offer of cultural activities that make available to visitors various expressions of the culture of Mexico and the world. The mansion of the early twentieth century, illuminated by its glass windows, calls readers to walk among its high shelves of two floors and to know its wide range of titles.

=== Santa Catarina ===
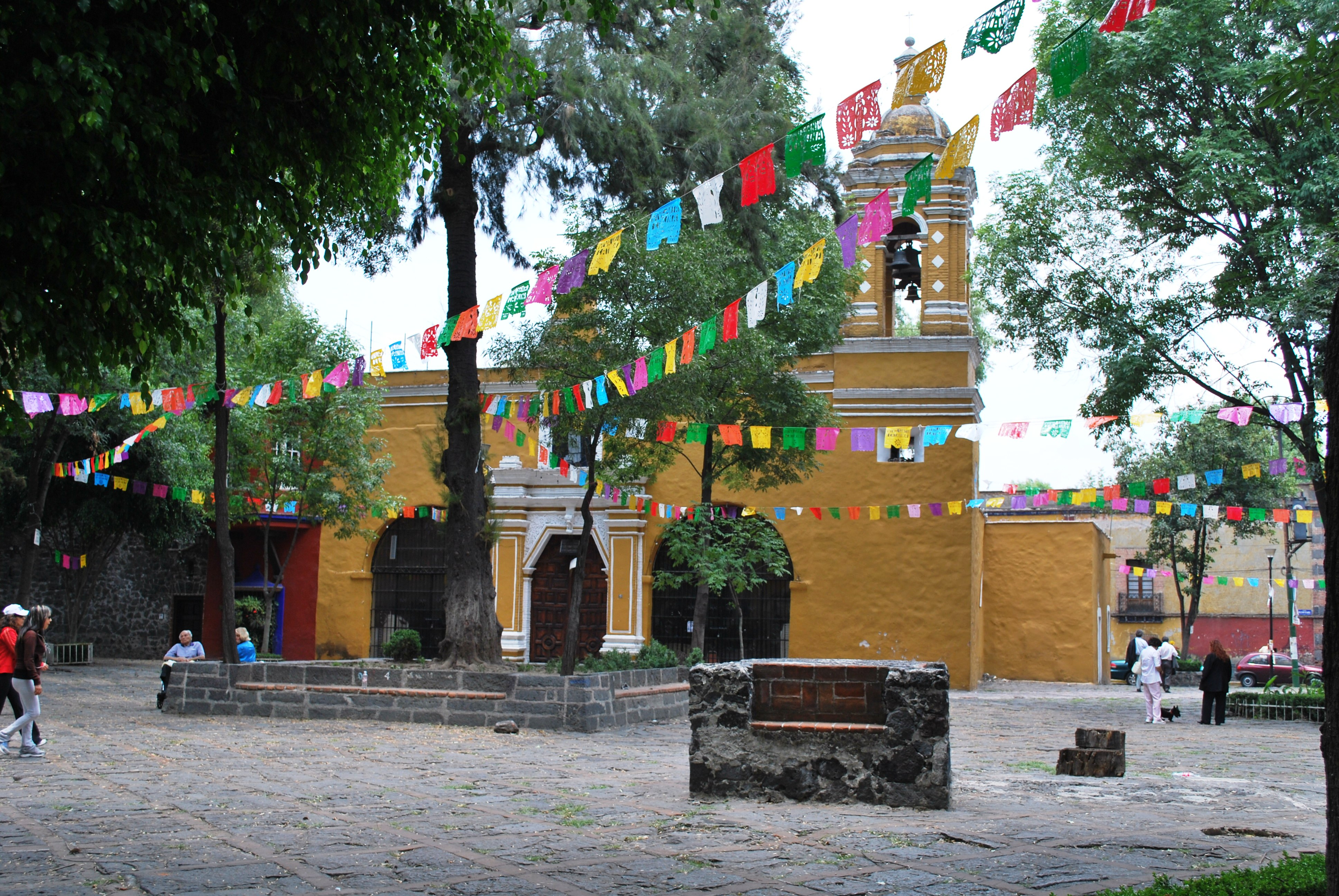
Santa Catarina Church

The Santa Catarina neighborhood is home to a large number of Coyoacán's landmarks. It is located just west of the Plaza del Centenario along Calle Francisco Sosa. It is a small square with a bright yellow chapel named the Capilla de Santa Catarina. This chapel was built for use by the indigenous population in the very early colonial period. The building today conserves some of the original built in the 1520s when it was originally built as an open chapel, and ornamental work done in the mid 17th century, when the nave with cannon vault was added. Later a tower and a linterna were added, but these fell in the 1985 earthquake. Inside there are 400-year-old murals. It was declared a National Monument in 1932. There are also several restored colonial era houses around it. On one side, there is Casa de Cultura de Coyacán which hold art and cultural events. Once part of a hacienda, behind the building there are large gardens filled with vegetation.

The Dolores del Río House is located on Salvador Novo Street in Barrio de Santa Catarina. It is also known as “La Escondida” (The Hidden One), where Mexican actress Dolores del Río lived. It is neo-Colonial in design when it was built for her, but it has since been remodeled and has a more modern appearance. It still functions as a private residence.

The Miguel Angel de Quevedo House is on Francisco Sosa Street in Barrio de Santa Catarina. It is a very large structure for the area, filled with trees and plants both inside and out. Originally, these gardens were watered with river flow from the Río Magdalena, but this river is no longer accessible because it is encased. It is still used as a residence.

The Casa del Indio Fernández House is located on Dulce Oliva Street in Barrio de Santa Catarina. The house was constructed over twenty years by architect Manuel Parra for Mexican filmmaker Emilio “Indio” Fernández, who died in the house in 1986. The house is colonial in style with a facade constructed from volcanic rock. Today it belongs to Fernandez's daughter, Adela.

The Casa de Cultura Jesús Reyes Heroles is located on Francisco Sosa, named after a historian and political scientist from Veracruz. The house is on a property, which was called Izotitlán, meaning “izotes” a type of wild palm to make hats. In the colonial period, the house belonged to Juan de Luis Celis who had a small paper factory. It changed hands several times by the 20th century, but all this time, the structure kept its original appearance including very old atrium cross in the first courtyard. In the 1940s, it was enlarged, but its colonial style was respected. The building gained its current function in 1985, when President Miguel de la Madrid donated the house and lands to create a cultural center. Today, the center has three art galleries, named after Alfredo Ramos Martinez, Guillermo Kahlo and Miguel Alvarez Acosta to house temporary exhibits, an area to teach the culinary arts and two multiuse rooms. At the beginning of the 20th century, the Casa de Cultura Jesús Reyes Heroles was inhabited by María Concepción Armida, who is being considered for beatification by the Catholic Church. It is said that she performed a number of miracles in this house. Behind this house is the Callejón del Aguacate, which is said to be haunted by the ghost associated with the woman, and local school children are known to go looking for the ghost.

The San José del Altillo Church is located on the corner of Avenida Universidad and Miguel Angel de Quevedo. This area was once the El Altillo Hacienda. This hacienda was donated by its last owner, Aguayo Piña to the Misioneros del Espíritu Santo religious order in the very early 19th century. Here they founded the Centro de Espiritualidad San José del Altillo spiritual center. Today, the church site has a modern structure on it, built by architect Enrique de la Mora.

According to legend, the San Antonio Panzacola Chapel was built by the mother of a group of smugglers to fulfill a promise or to offer gratitude. It is also said that it was the transfer point and a customs checkpoint for goods heading from Coyoacán and San Angel to Mexico City.

The Casa Alvarado is now the home of the Fonoteca National or National Sound Library. Octavio Paz died here in 1998.

The "Alfredo Guati Rojo" National Watercolor Museum is dedicated to watercolor paintings. It was founded by Cuernavaca-born watercolor artist Alfredo Guati in 1967. Originally located in Colonia Roma, it was moved to its current location near Santa Catarina after the 1985 earthquake.

=== Colonia del Carmen ===
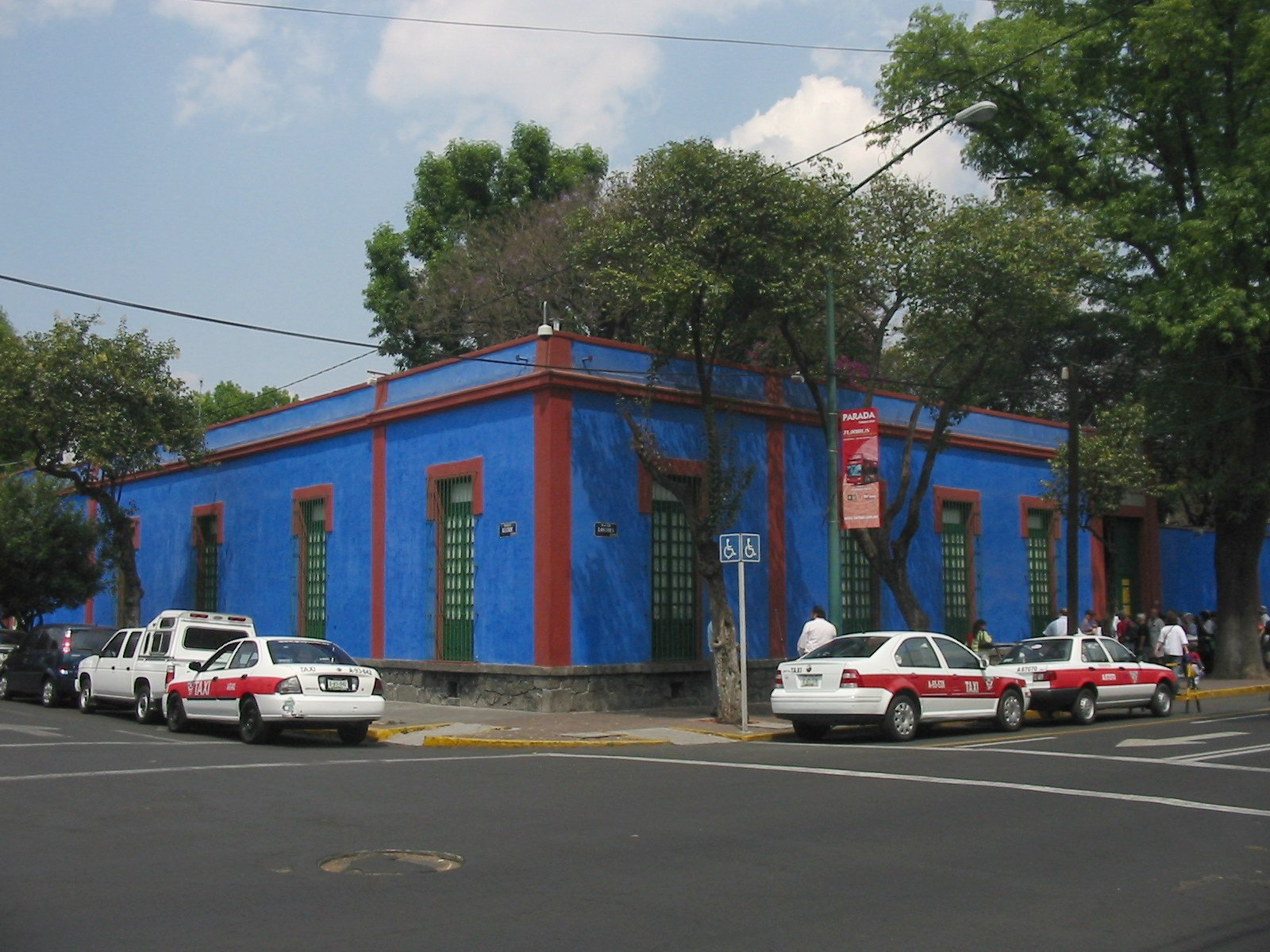
Frida Kahlo Museum

Colonia del Carmen was not a village in the past. It was built in 1890 and named in honour of Carmen Romero, the wife of then president Porfirio Díaz, and it is best known for having several of the borough's museums and other landmarks. The Del Carmen colonia has had an intellectual and vanguard reputation since the 1920s, when it was the home of Salvador Novo, Octavio Paz, Mario Moreno and Dolores del Río. The Frida Kahlo Museum, popularly called “La Casa Azul” (The Blue House) is one of the most popular sites in Coyoacán. It is a deep blue house on Londres Street, built in the early 20th century in which Frida Kahlo was born in 1907 and in which she spent the last thirteen years of her life. The house contains a selection of Kahlo's personal art collection and a large collection of pre-Hispanic artifacts, Mexican folk art (mostly indigenous inspired jewelry and clothes which she wore) and works by José María Velasco, Paul Klee and Diego Rivera. The museum also contains a café and a small gift shop. The Kahlo pieces are some of her minor works and include El Marxismo Dará la Salud, which shows her casting away her crutches. There is an unfinished portrait of Joseph Stalin, who became a hero to Kahlo after Rivera had a falling out with Russian Communism theorist Leon Trotsky. In this portrait, Stalin stands before a wheelchair. The folk art collection contains Rivera's collection of retablos.

The Leon Trotsky House Museum is located near the Frida Kahlo Museum. Trotsky was forced into exile in 1929 by Joseph Stalin and in 1937, due to efforts by Diego Rivera and Frida Kahlo, he was granted asylum in Mexico. At first, Trotsky and his wife lived in the La Casa Azul with Frida, but after a falling out with Diego Rivera, the couple moved to this house on Viena Street in 1938. The house looks like a fortress, and it was fortified to protect Trotsky from assassins. It has high outer walls and watchtowers once occupied by armed guards. Inside, there is a small house and garden. The house and garden were original with the defenses added later after an attack led by David Alfaro Siqueiros, who shot up the house. Trotsky and his wife survived by hiding under furniture. The bullet holes from this attack remain on the outer walls of the house.

However, in 1940, a Spanish Stalin supporter by the name of Ramón Mercader managed to gain entry to the house and to kill Trotsky with a mountaineer's ice axe. The room in which Trotsky was killed remains exactly as it was at that moment, including the papers and the books in their exact positions. As a museum, some other buildings were added along the walls which contain photos from Trotsky's lifetime, biographical notes in Spanish and memorabilia such as Trotsky trademark small round glasses. In the garden, there is a tomb which contains Trotsky's and his wife's ashes. The complex also houses the Instituto del Derecho de Asilo y las Libertades Públicas (Institute for the Right of Asylum and Public Liberties) which was founded in 1990 and the Rafael Galván Library, which contains a collection of books with social themes. These organizations occasionally sponsor events such as expositions and conferences.

The Escuela Superior de Música (Higher School of Music) on Fernández Leal Street in Colonia Del Carmen is an imitation of the house occupied by Shakespeare's Othello. It stands out due to its many stained glass windows with Arab phrases inscribed against a stucco facade. This school used to be a pulqueria called La Rosita, which was frequented by intellectuals in the area. When this bar was demolished, it took with it a mural done by Diego Rivera.

The La Capilla Theater is on Madrid Street in Colonia Del Carmen. This building was part of the ruins on a portion of an old hacienda purchased by Salvador Novo around 1950. In the ruins of this structure he visualized a theater and hired Alejandro Prieto to make the adaptation. This theater was opened to the public in 1953 along with a restaurant called El Reflectorio alongside. Later a bar called El Habito, today called El Vicio was added. The theater remains as one of the more important cultural venues in the borough.

The Juárez Institute is located on the corner of Cuauhtemoc and Abasolo Streets. It was built in the 19th century. Originally, this was part of a Presbyterian church complex, but this church has since moved to another location on Cuauhtemoc street. Today, it houses an educational institution. The building is two floors, with a sober facade made of stone and brick. The sides are framed by sandstone, with the main entrance on Cuauhtemoc. The interior has a large courtyard which contains gardens.

The Coyoacán Market was built in 1956 by Pedro Ramírez Vázquez in a Functionalist style on a site that originally housed stables and horse corrals.

=== Churubusco ===
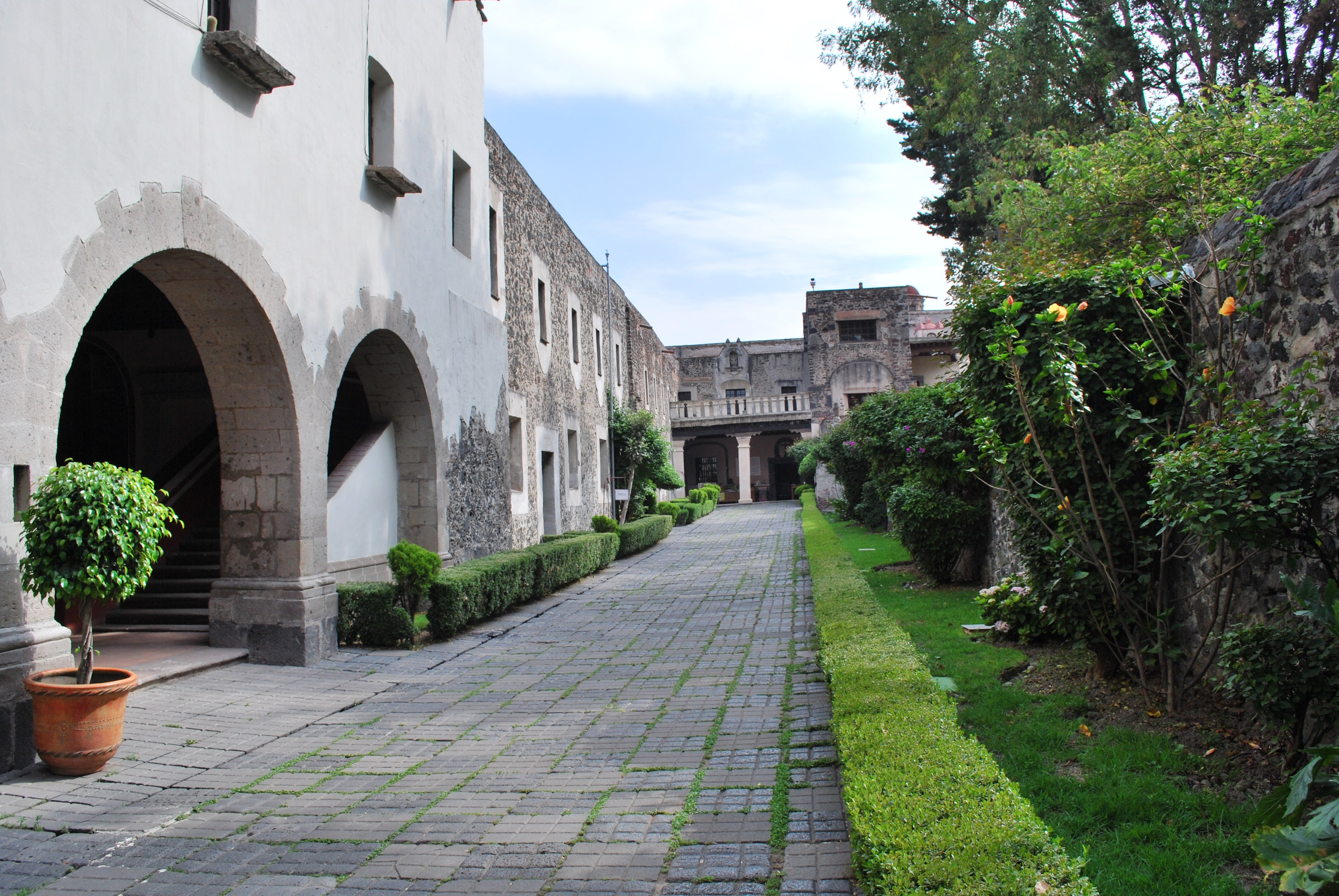
Walkway inside the Churubusco monastery

The Churubusco neighborhood has the historic Dieguinos monastery located near the ancient road to Iztapalapa. In the pre-Hispanic period, this area was a small island, which was called Teopanzolco, at the juncture of Lake Texcoco and Lake Xochimilco. In the 17th century, the Spanish built the monastery of Churubusco over a ceremonial site dedicated to the god Huitzilopochtli. This monastery complex is best known for its role during the Mexican–American War. The Mexicans, aided by the "Saint Patrick's Battalion", a military unit composed of catholic immigrants (mainly Irish), had fortified the monastery and fought until they ran out of ammunition and then beaten only after hand-to-hand combat. When U.S. General David Twiggs asked Mexican General Pedro María de Anaya to surrender his ammunition, the reply is said to have been "If there were any, you would not be here." There is a memorial to this event outside the main entrance and a plaque commemorating the "Irish martyrs". The monastery's church still retains its original function, but most of the rest of the complex is now the Museo Nacional de las Intervenciones; Parque Xicoténcatl is across the street. The collection includes an American map of the facility from 1847, artifacts from the French Intervention in Mexico and a plot by Henry Lane Wilson to bring down the government of Francisco I. Madero in 1913.

The Casa de Cristo (House of Christ) is located on Heroes Street in Churubusco. It was constructed in 1906 as a residence for Bertha Vizcayno de Vergara who remained there until 1967. Today, it is still private property but is used as a restaurant. It has three floors and twelve rooms, with walls of brick and limestone and wood roof decorated with tiles. The front has sandstone Ionic columns. The name comes from the inscription of "Casa de Cristo" over the main entrance.

=== Pueblo de los Reyes, La Candelaria and other traditional "barrios" ===
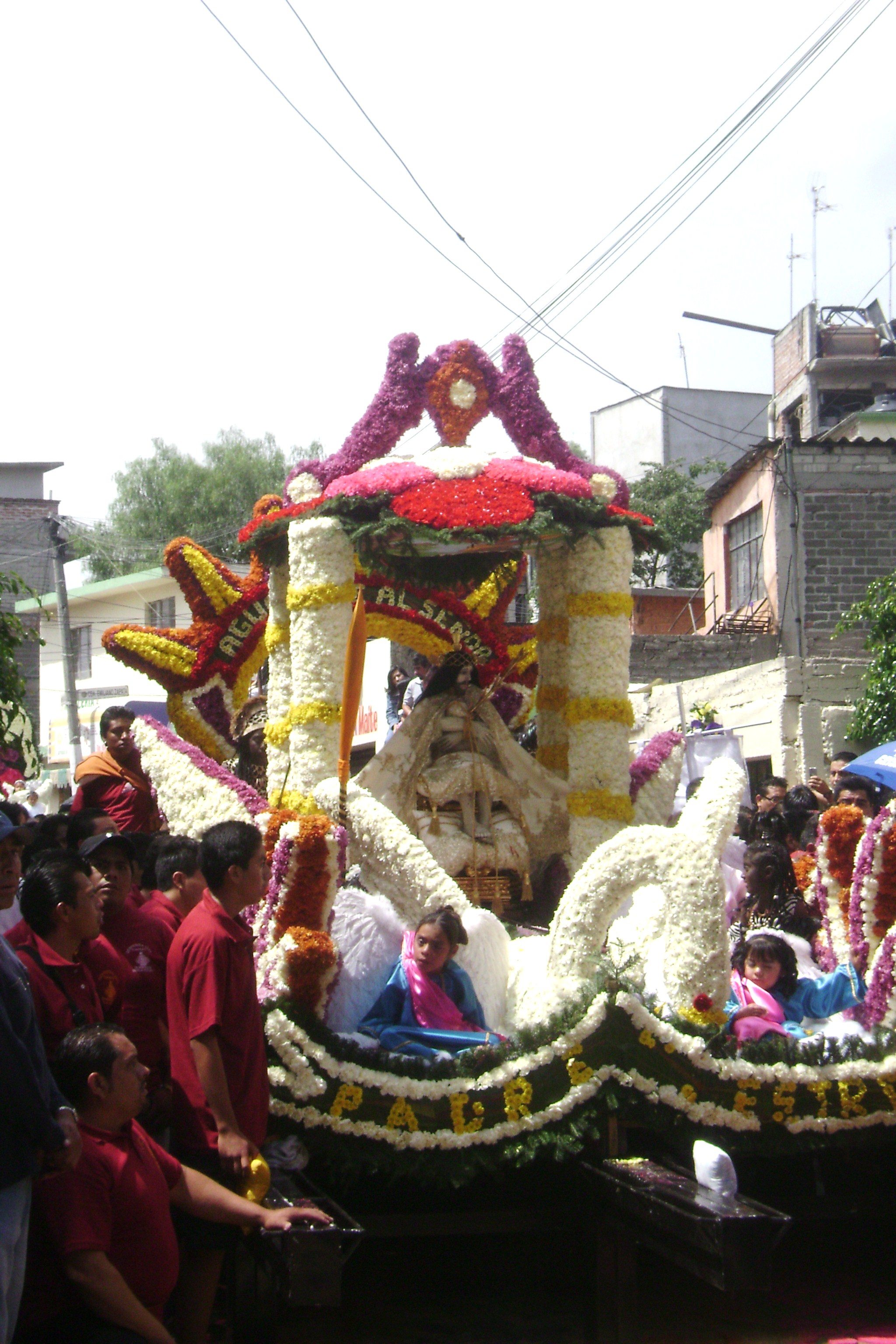
Procession with the Señor de las Misericordias

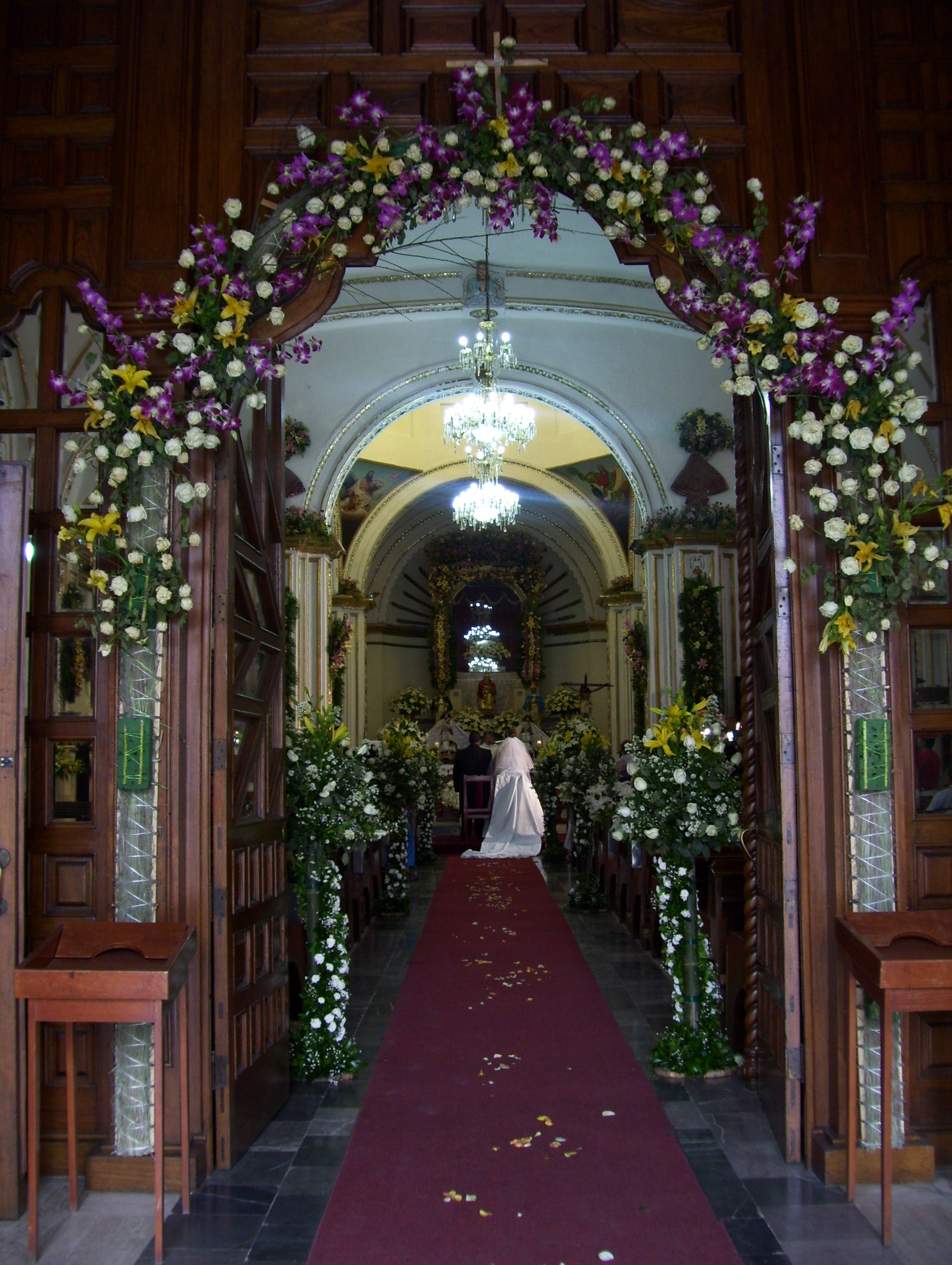
Inside Templo de los Santos Reyes

While lacking in landmarks, La Candelaria and Los Reyes are considered to be the two most traditional communities in the borough, with mostly religious traditions that extend back into the colonial period. Much of Los Reyes’ traditions revolve around a crucifix imaged called the Señor de las Misericordias. According to legend, sometime in the 18th century, residents of Santiago Zapotitlan, today in Tlahuac borough, were carrying the image to Mexico City for restoration. Upon encountering a business producing pulque, they decided to go inside after leaving the image in a supposedly secure place. When they were done drinking, they could not find the image where they left it or anywhere nearby. A few days later a tlachiquero (one who takes nectar out of maguey plants) heard a child's cry in the area and found the image. Word went out to try to find which church the image belonged to. Representatives of various communities come to claim it, but none could lift the image. When it was the turn of the Pueblo de los Reyes, they prayed that the image would be light as a feather for them and the easily lifted it. They returned home joyous to have been chosen by the image. Later, representatives of Santiago Zapotitlan came to reclaim the image, but again it became too heavy to lift and it has remained in the church ever since. The festival called the Recibimiento del Señor de las Misericordia occurs in September in both Los Reyes and La Candelaria. It celebrates the arrival of the image according to the legend. From June until September, the image is sent out to visit various communities in the borough. During the ceremony to return the image to its home church, the people of La Candelaria bring the image and the people of Los Reyes receive it with much fanfare.

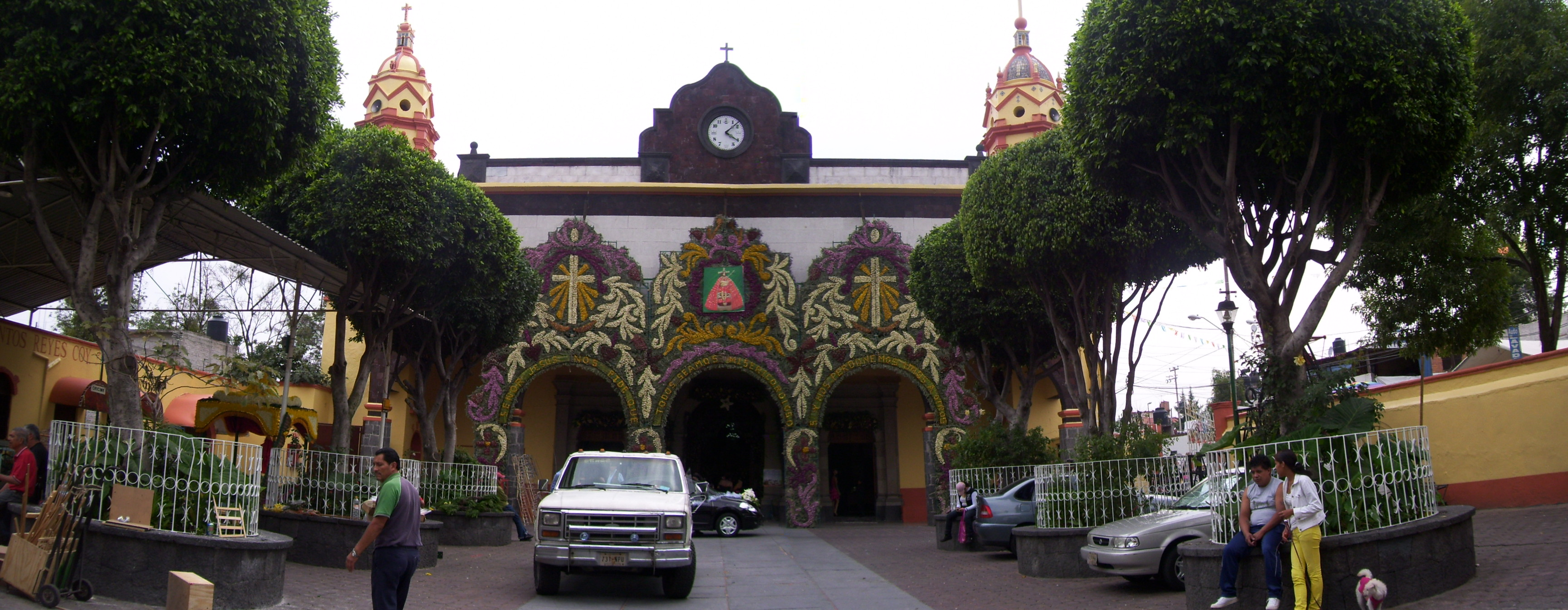
Templo de los Santos Reyes, dressed for 6 January festivities

On 6 January in the Pueblo de los Reyes, the main square of the community is decorated with flower portals and "carpets" made by carefully arranging colored sawdust on the ground. There are also processions and a ceremony called the vítor used to announce coming of the festival. Reeds are cut and decorated with multicolored crepe paper and half inflated balloons and then are given to children as they pass by on the streets. There is also a parade that features mojigangas which are large structures made of cardboard and paper in the shape of human figures. These are hollow and placed on the shoulders of parade participants. An image of the Nativity and the Three Wise Men is carried through the town on a truck from which bags of candies are tossed to children.

The image for the La Candelaria neighborhood is an image of the Virgin Mary called the Virgen de la Candelaria. The feast day for this image occurs on 2 February in the Pueblo de la Candelaria. This event is organized by a mayordomo who is chosen each year and last for ten days. It includes religious activities such as a novena and a special Mass. It also includes cultural, sporting and recreational activities, which also gives the event the alternative name of La Semana Cultural de La Candelaria (Culture Week of La Candelaria). During Holy Week, La Candelaria holds a passion play which runs about 4 km from the main plaza to the Huayamilpas Ecological and Recreational Park.

The feast day of Francis of Asisi, patron of the Barrio Cuadrante de San Francisco is announced by a band playing wind instruments playing through the streets. In addition to more common elements, the celebration also includes the lighting of the candle of three large wooden crosses, performed by groups performing indigenous dances such as Concheros. The crosses are eventually surrounded by a multitude of candles in the night as people pray. The origin of this tradition is unknown.

The feast day of Saint Ursula, patroness of Santa Ursula Coapa last for about a week. The first three days are dedicated to 40 hours of prayer. Other religious events include processions on Calzada de Tlalpan and the blessing of taxi drivers. Cultural and recreational activities include a marathon, fireworks, including those on large frames called toritos (little bulls) and castillos (castles), indigenous and folk dancing including Concheros, Santiagueros and Chinelos, and music played by wind bands especially from neighboring Tepepan and San Lucas Xochimanca.

Other traditional neighborhoods include San Lucas, San Mateo, El Niño Jesús, San Francisco and San Antonio. The San Lucas and San Mateo barrios are sliced through by small arroyos and used to be surrounded by cornfields and pastures for cattle. The El Niño Jesús and San Francisco barrios are filled with very winding alleyways over black volcanic rock, called pedregal, from an ancient eruption of Xitle. These two are separated from the historic center by Avenida Miguel A de Quevedo. The San Antonio barrio is very small with an equally small chapel by the name of San Antonio Panzacola. This chapel belonged to the Carmelites and is located alongside an old stone bridge over the Río Magdalena.

== History ==
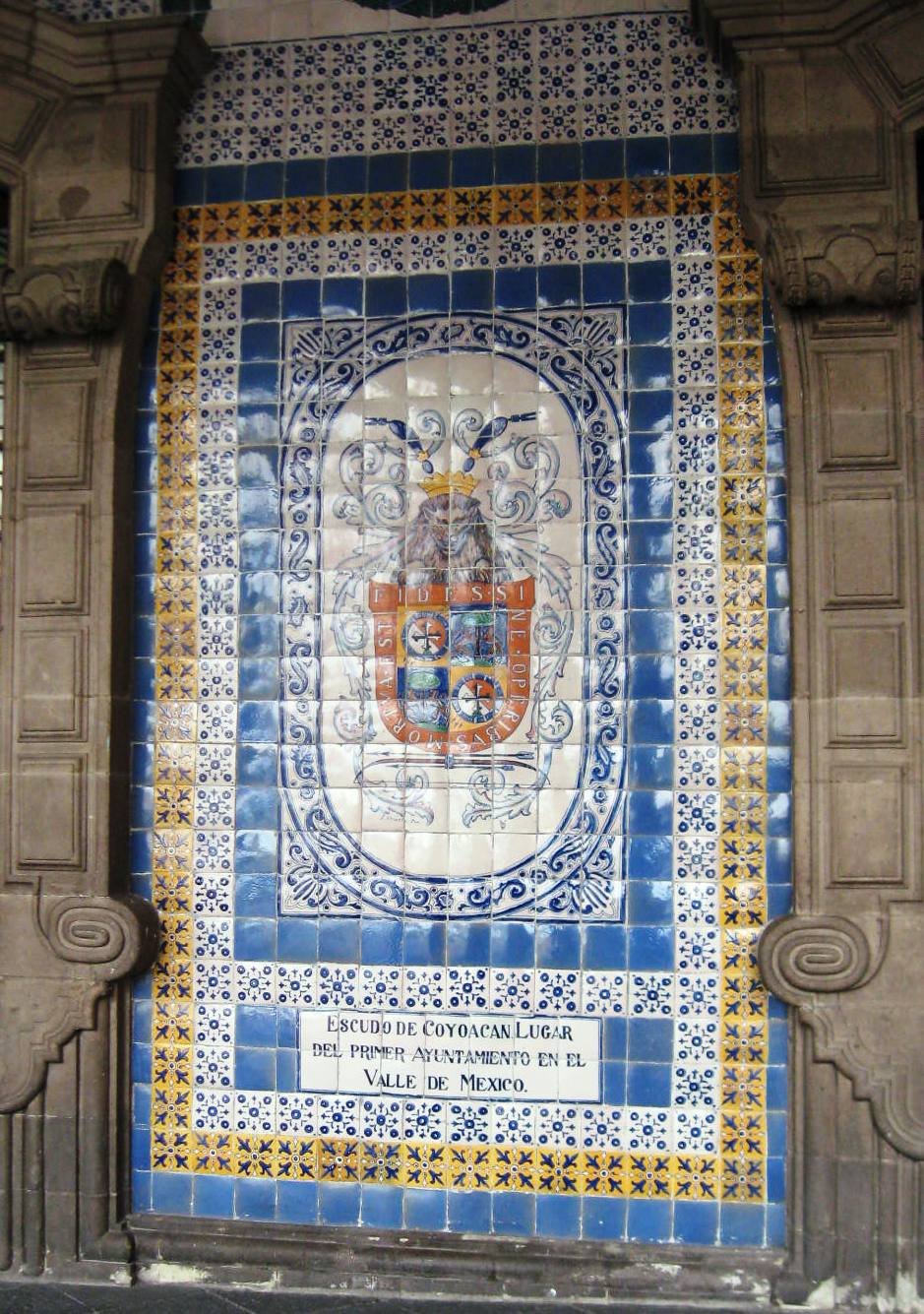
Tile mosaic on Coyoacán coat of arms on the Federal District buildings in Mexico City

The name comes from the Nahuatl original Coyōhuahcān. It is most often translated as "place of coyotes" but the word more accurately means "place of those who have coyotes." The area's Nahuatl glyph prominently depicts the figure of a coyote in profile, with its tongue hanging out and down halfway across the body where it curls. This tongue position often indicates hunger or thirst, but can also indicate tiredness. This glyph was likely devised when the pre-Hispanic settlement was founded around the 10th to 12th centuries.

=== Pre-Hispanic Period ===
In the pre-Hispanic period, Coyoacán was originally an independent dominion or altepetl. It was a major center of trade on the southern shore of Lake Texcoco. Its people were Tecpanecas, who were farmers and stoneworkers specializing in the volcanic stone from the old lava flow of Xitle. It had been a Tepaneca dominion for 300 years before being conquered by the Aztecs between 1429 and 1431. Famous rulers include Maxtla and his son Tecollotzin. Coyoacán was majority Nahua, but there was also an Otomi minority in the area.

The Aztecs gave the area its current name; however their rule was hated by the native Tepanecas, who welcomed Hernán Cortés and the Spanish, allowing them to use this southern port on Lake Texcoco as a headquarters during the conquest of Tenochtitlan.

=== The Conquest and Colonial Era ===
After the Aztec capital was destroyed, Cortés remained in Coyoacán and made it the first capital of New Spain from 1521 to 1523. During the colonial period, the village remained independent of Mexico City, separated by farmland and lakes, filled with haciendas and monasteries. This allowed the area to maintain many of its plazas and narrow cobblestone streets to this day. During the sixteenth century and into the seventeenth, there was an active Spanish land market in Coyoacán, with many bills of sale in Nahuatl found in the archives. Rebecca Horn found over 100 such bills of sale naming Nahua men and women selling to Spaniards. Natives also dictated last wills and testaments in Nahuatl the colonial era, which further contribute to our understanding of continuities and changes in Nahuas' situation in the colonial era. The altepetl (town) of Coyoacán continued to assess tribute on the basis of the size of a person's land holdings long after Spaniards had switched to a head tax. The earliest extant native pictorial of Coyoacán, the so-called Códice de Coyoacán, dating from a 1553 visita (inspection) gives a baseline for tribute and labor.

One important monastery was the Churubusco monastery, at which the Battle of Churubusco took place on August 20, 1847, during the Mexican–American War. Ten years later, the area became part of the Federal District of Mexico City when it was expanded by the 1857 Constitution.

=== 19th and 20th Centuries ===
From the rest of the 19th century to the middle of the 20th, Coyoacán remained separate from Mexico City proper, keeping its rural reputation and gaining one for cantinas and pulque bars. During the Mexican Revolution, Victoriano Huerta was sometimes found in cantinas here, proclaiming that the "only foreigners welcome [in Mexico] were Martell and Hennessy."

The historic center and other villages were linked to each other and Mexico City proper by rail lines and trolleys. The rail line linked Mexico City and the historic center from the 1860s to the early 1900s. Many of the old villages were linked by a trolley on Santa Catarina Road, now Francisco Sosa. This trolley was initially pulled by mules but later it became electrified. In the 1920s, areas of the borough became a magnet for artists and intellectuals after being promoted by Francisco Sosa Escalante. Over time, it attracted names such as Salvador Novo, Octavio Paz, Mario Moreno (aka Cantínflas), and Dolores del Río, exiles such as Leon Trotsky and Romania's King Carl, as well as its two most famous residents, Diego Rivera and Frida Kahlo. Trotsky lived close by Rivera and Kahlo and was murdered by one of Stalin's agents. Rivera and Kahlo's presence gave the area a bohemian reputation. In 1923, the Escuela de Pintura al Aire Libre (Open Air School of Painting) was established at the former San Pedro Martír Hacienda, establishing the area as an artists’ enclave. From the 1920s to the 1940s, the area was a mix of rural farms and upper-class families who were building mansions and country homes. In the 1930s, Attending mass on Sundays was a must although attendance was segregated by social class and age. It was commons for the youth to go to the Cine Centenario movie theatre (now a Sanborns) after Mass. Some youths, called Vanguardias preferred to meet on Thursdays and Sundays in private home to watch alternative films such as documentaries and animated features. Other forms of entertainment included picking fruit from trees or horse racing on Xicotencatl Street. The main street market, or tianguis, for the area was called Luis Mondragón, which set up each Friday where the Coyoacán gymnasium is now, selling foodstuff, domestic animals, and other necessities. There were also about 25 pulque bars or pulquerías.

=== Absorption into the Distrito Federal and 20th and 21st century developments ===
The area was officially designated the Mexico City borough of Coyoacán in 1928. By the mid 20th century, the urban sprawl of Mexico City began to envelop the borough, much as it was doing to other former villages and municipalities in the Federal District such as Tacuba, Tacubaya, Mixcoac and others. The rural economy gave way as fields and orchards were built over, as well as the remaining lake and conifer forests. This has deforested the area and depleted the soil leaving very little wildlife. There have been efforts to cultivate human-planted forests, mostly of eucalyptus and other trees in areas such as Zacatépetl, which had been completely deforested.

This integration into the city proper has brought with it big city problems. The first is that redevelopment will take over areas which still maintain some of their rural or village feel, which has happened in other formerly independent communities. In 2008, neighborhood groups worked against the construction of new apartment complexes in the borough in order to halt further urbanization. The area's popularity, both as a place to live and as a place to visit on weekends, along with its narrow winding streets has caused it to have some of the worst traffic problems in the city, with traffic jams and parking problems. In spite of the fact that there are six parking garages in the historic center, drivers in the area still jockey for spaces on the street. The six public garages are always full. This makes for big business for establishments which offer valet parking and for franeleros. Franeleros are people who illegally take over public street parking and charge for it. The franeleros charge to "take care of vehicle" but also threaten to damage those who refuse to pay. There are an estimated 250 franeleros working the borough, and in 2010, the city government proposed regulating them instead of eliminating them, which the residents of Coyoacán and neighboring San Angel have strongly rejected. One last issue is the proliferation of unauthorized street vendors and tianguis markets.

During the 2000s, the city and borough have done major rehabilitation and reconstruction work in the borough, especially in the historic center, renovating plazas, colonial buildings and streets. This work moved to areas in and around the Plaza Hidalgo and Plaza del Centenario in 2008, with the main goals being the redesign of the plazas, the renovation of the Parish of San Juan Bautista and the removal of street stalls in and around the plazas. Opposition to the removal of the vendors came not only from the vendors themselves, but also from some neighborhood groups and local businesses who feared their removal would hurt tourism. In March 2008, the two plazas were closed off by authorities for renovation work, forcing the removal of more than 500 street stalls for renovation of the two plazas and the streets around them costing 88.3 million pesos. When the plazas reopened in 2009, there were confrontations between the vendors and authorities, both on the plazas with police and in the courts, despite the fact that the borough built a nearby bazaar on Felipe Carrillo Puerto. Vendor's groups eventually obtained a court order to allow for about forty vendors in the plazas, citing the 25 years or so when about 150 vendors were tolerated on the premises, even though this order is opposed by residents' groups. As of 2010, most vendors remain off the two plazas proper.

In 2010, the borough hosted an event in the Jardín Hidalgo where the Guinness record for largest mug of hot chocolate in the world was broken.

== Education ==
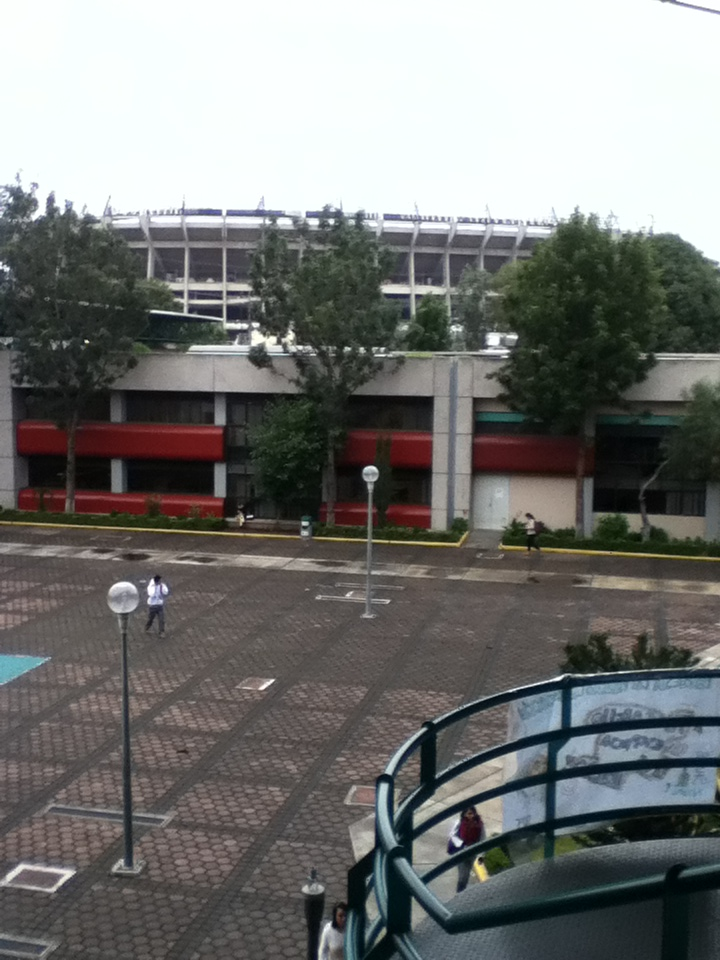
Escuela Preparatoria Coyoacán "Ricardo Flores Magón"

=== Elementary schools ===
- Reino de Jordania
- Tecayehuatzin]
- Professor Jesús Silva Herzog
- República de Checoslovaquia
- Activa Paidos
- República de Guatemala
- República de Finlandia
- Professor Fernando Brom Rojas
- Centenario de Juárez
- República de Suazilandia
- Professor Samuel Delgado I. Moya
- Professor Francisco Javier Lilly Huerta
- Professor Anton Semionovich Makarenko

=== Middle schools ===
- Diurna Número 35 General Vicente Guerrero
- Diurna Número 130 Guadalupe Ceniceros de Zavaleta
- Diurna Número 139 José Enrique Rodó
- Diurna Número 127 Ramón López Velarde
- Diurna Número 145 José Guadalupe Nájera Jiménez
- Diurna Número 149 David Alfaro Siqueiros
- Diurna Número 178 Madame Curie
- Diurna Número 208 Salvador Díaz Mirón
- Diurna Número 280 Max Shein
- Diurna Número 101 Ludwig van Beethoven
- Técnica Número 1043 Luis Enrique Erro
- Técnica Número 1084 Belisario Domínguez Palencia
- Centro de Educación Artística (CEDART) Diego Rivera
- Técnica Número 67 Fco. Diaz de Leon
- Técnica Número 49 José Vasconcelos

=== Senior high schools ===
- Centro de Estudios Tecnológicos Industrial y de Servicios 2
- Colegio de Bachilleres 4
- Colegio de Bachilleres 17
- Centro de Estudios Científicos y Tecnológicos 13 (IPN)
- Colegio de Ciencias y Humanidades Plantel Sur
- Centro de Estudios Superiores Navales
- Centro de Educación Artística (CEDART) Diego Rivera
- National public high schools of the National Autonomous University of Mexico (UNAM) Escuela Nacional Preparatoria include: Escuela Nacional Preparatoria 6 "Antonio Caso"
- Public high schools of the Instituto de Educación Media Superior del Distrito Federal (IEMS) include: Escuela Preparatoria Coyoacán "Ricardo Flores Magón" (Viejo Ejido de Santa Úrsula)

=== International schools ===
- Lycée Franco-Mexicain (Liceo Franco Mexicano) - Coyoacán Campus

=== Other private schools ===
- Colegio Olinca Periférico Campus
- Escuela Mier y Pesado
- Colegio Anglo Mexicano de Coyoacán in Colonia San Francisco Culhuacán
- Colegio Anglo Americano de Coyoacán in Fraccionamiento Paseos de Taxqueña
- Modern American School in Romero de Terreros (ES)

== Ciudad Universitaria ==
The Ciudad Universitaria (University City) is UNAM's main campus. Designed by architects Mario Pani and Enrique del Moral, it was built in the 1950s to move the university from the scattered colonial buildings in the historic center of Mexico City. It was declared a World Heritage Site by UNESCO in 2007. The Biblioteca Central (Central Library) is a large rectangular prism in the center of the campus. It was built by Gustavo Saavedra, Juan Martínez and Juan O'Gorman. O'Gorman was in charge of decorating the four sides with multicolored mosaics of stone pieces brought from all parts of Mexico. The murals relate to the history of Mexico. The north side reflects the pre-Hispanic period; the south reflects the colonial period and the east is from the modern period. The west side is meant to represent Mexico today with the coat of arms of the university in the center with José Vasconcelos' motto of "Por mi raza hablará mi espíritu" (For my race, speaks my spirit.). These mosaics are the largest of their type in the world.

The Torre de Rectoría (Dean's Tower) is the main administration building for UNAM. It was designed by Mario Pani, Enrique del Moral and Salvador Ortega as a tower of glass and marble, decorated with three-dimensional murals by David Alfaro Siqueiros, mixing painting and sculpting. The north side has a piece entitled "El Pueblo a la Universidad y la Universidad al pueblo" (People to the university and University to the People). The work on the south side is called "Estudiantes que extiende sus brazos a la cultura" (Students who extend their arms to culture). On the east side is an unfinished work related to the culture of Mexico.

The Centro Cultural Universitario was built between 1976 and 1980 by engineers and architects of the school headed by Arcadio Artis Espiritu and Orso Nuñez Ruiz Velasco. It was created to house facilities related to various art forms and by artists from all over the world as well as Mexico. It is built over volcanic rock, oriented north–south and is surrounded by desert vegetation. The main entrance on Avenida Insurgentes contains a mural by Carlos Mérida. The complex contains the National Library and National Periodical Collection, the Instituto de Estudio Bibliográficos, the Coordinacion de Diffusion Cultural and the Julio Torre Bookstore/Café.

The Estadio Olímpico México 68 is the main sports facility built for the Olympic Games of 1968 held in Mexico City. It was constructed to simulate a volcanic cone with a wide crater. The high relief decoration in the front was designed by Diego Rivera and created as a mosaic using naturally colored stones. Today, the stadium is the home of the Pumas professional soccer team.

The Sala Nezahualcóyotl is a concert hall and the main site for the UNAM philharmonic orchestra. The building was inaugurated in 1976. It was designed acoustically to allow the orchestra to be in the center of the hall and seats 2311 people around a 240 square metres (2,600 sq ft) stage.

The Sala Migual Covarrubias y Carlos Chávez is used primarily for dance recitals but has also hosted operatic events, musical theater, and stage plays.

The Juan Ruiz de Alarcón Theater and Sor Juana Inés de la Cruz Forum were both inaugurated in 1979 as space for cultural events under the same roof. They have a capacity of 430 and 120 spectators respectively. The Forum does not define stage and audience space so that the facility can be adapted to a number of different arrangements. The stage of the Theatre, with its 12-meter (39 ft) walls, can be disassembled partially or fully.

The Espacio Escultórico or Sculpture Space is a monumental sculpture made of 64 stone triangular blocks arranged in a circle such that from above, it looks like a crown. Inside this space is exposed naturally occurring volcanic stone. The outside of the sculpture retains its natural vegetation. The idea is to combine nature and art and represents the cosmology of pre-Hispanic Mexico.

The Universum Museo de Ciencias is an interactive museum with 315 exhibits related to the natural and physical sciences. Halls are named for mathematics, chemistry, energy, biological diversity, agriculture and food, ecology, human biology and health, Science in the big city, animal behavior and society and more.

Running across the borough from the east end and ending in the west near the university campus is Avenida Miguel Angel de Quevedo. This street is lined with bookstores, such as Nalanda, El Sotano de Coyoacán, "Octavio Paz" and two branches of the Gandhi chain. The first was one of the Gandhi stores, placed in 1973 at the site of a former supermarket. The bookstores are here because the area is close to the Ciudad Universitaria and the student population that lives in the area. The bookstores have attracted other cultural businesses such as theaters cafes and restaurants. The second Gandhi store, called Gandhi 2000, was built to be a cultural center as well as a bookstore with literature related events, children's activities, concerts and more. It also has a series of nude sculpture by Gabriel Ponzanelli.

Ciudad Universitaria is very large, so you might need a Ciudad Universitaria's map.

== Other landmarks in the borough ==
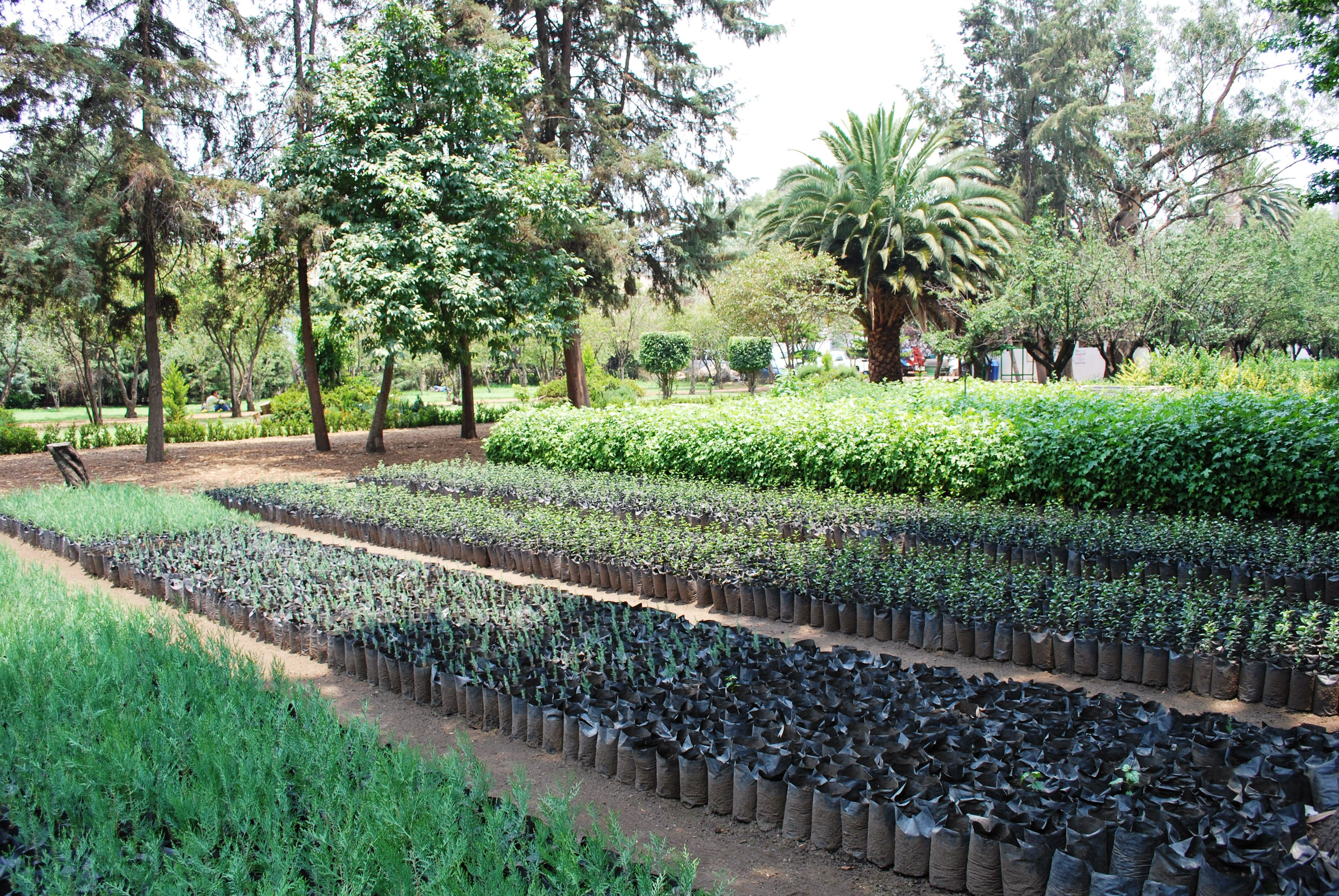
Seedling beds in the Viveros

The Viveros de Coyoacán is located on the west side of the borough just north of the Ciudad Universitaria. This land once belonged to Miguel Angel de Quevedo, but they were nationalized under President Venustiano Carranza and today it serves as a park and a plant nursery for trees used in reforestation projects. It is the first plant nursery of its kind in Mexico. Today, it not only germinates and grows trees for reforestation projects, it is considered to be one of Mexico City's "lungs." This and other areas serve to recharge aquifers and add oxygen to the air. In the past, this park was also home to the first Escuela Nacional de Tauromaquia (National School of Bullfighting).

Centro Nacional de las Artes (National Arts Center) is located on Avenida Rio Churubusco just east of Calazada de Tlalpan. It contains the Blas Galindo Auditorium, the Teatro de las Artes, two other theaters, the national music conservatory as well as schools of theater, dance, cinema, painting, sculpture and engraving. The building is modern. It has a bookstore and art materials shop open to the public.

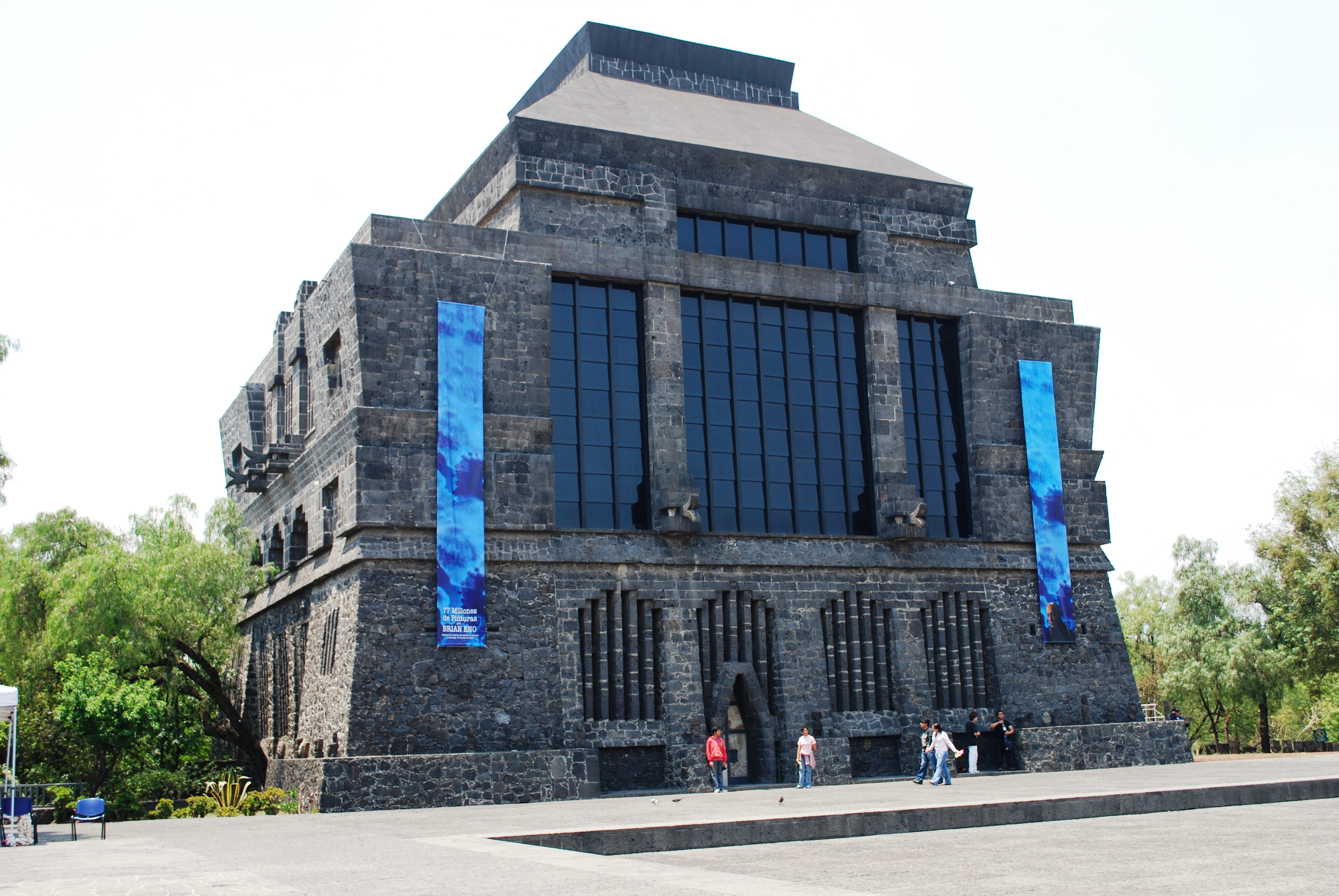
Anahuacalli Museum

Anahuacalli is a museum designed by Diego Rivera to house his personal collection of pre-Hispanic art. It also contains some of his own work as well. The building is towering and fortress-like made of volcanic stone, incorporating stylistic features from several pre-Hispanic cultures. The name means "house of Anáhuac" Anáhuac was the Nahuatl name for the Valley of Mexico. The exhibits are mostly pottery and stone figures and other pieces chosen for their artistic value. Rivera's works on display are murals on the walls and ceilings, studies of major murals done in other locations such as El Hombre en el Cruce de los Caminos, which reflects the original El Hombre, Controlador del Universo, which is in the Palacio de Bellas Artes.

The Casa del Sol (House of the Sun) was constructed by the Aguilar and Quevedo families. In this house, Venustiano Carranza composed the Constitution of 1917. Legend says it was originally a country home for Miguel Angel de Quevedo. Today it is a privately owned building with a restaurant and catering business.

The Casa de Cultura Raúl Anguiano is located in the Pedregal area on a property with a 2 hectare lake. It is named after a Mexican artist whose work reflected the country's political and artistic history. The Casa de Cultura Ricardo Flores Magón was opened in 1986 with the name of Casa del Pueblo. Its currently named after a journalist and ideologue from the Mexican Revolution. This building is one of the few built specifically to be a cultural center to serve the eastern side of the borough, which is densely populated due to apartment complexes such as the CTM Infonavit Culhuacan and the Alianza Popular Revolucionaria. The building contains a stage theater, a multipurpose room, an open-air theater and a library. Other museums in the borough include the Museo de Arte Escultórico Geles Cabrera on Xicotencatl Street in Colonia del Carmen, the Museo del Automóvil on Avenida Division del Norte in Pueblo de San Pablo Tepetlapa, the Museo del Retrato Hablado on Avenida Universidad in Colonia del Carmen, Museo Cultural de las Artes Graficas on Calzada de Tlapan in Barrio de San Diego Churubusco and the Museo Alejandro Galindo on Avenida Santa Úrsula in Colonia Santa Úrsula. Other theaters includeTeatro Rafael Solana on Miguel Angel de Quevedo in Barrio del Cuadrante de San Francisco, Foro de la Conchita Forum on Vallara in the center, the Teatro Santa Catarina in Barrio Santa Catarina, the Teatro Coyoacán /Foro Rodolfo Usigli on Heroes Street in Barrio de San Mateo Churubusco, Teatro La Capilla on Madrid in Colonia del Carmen, Centro Nacional de las Artes in Calzada de Tlalpan in Colonia Country Club.

Estadio Azteca, located in the Santa Ursula area, is the home of the Club América and Mexican national soccer teams. It is also used for other events, including concerts, and hosted three FIFA World Cups. The rivalry, known as the Clasico Capitalino, is centered around the Coyoacán borough, as the home stadiums for both America and the Pumas are within a few miles of each other.

== Twinning ==
Coyoacán is a sister City of Arlington County, Virginia, United States; it has also been a sister city of Clifden, County Galway, Ireland since 2012.

== Notable residents ==
- Adolfo Aguilar Zínser
- David Alfaro Siqueiros
- Diana Bracho
- Luis Buñuel
- Wojciech Cejrowski
- Hernán Cortés
- Pedro de Alvarado
- Dolores del Río
- Marcela Del Río Reyes
- Miguel de la Madrid Hurtado
- Miguel Ángel de Quevedo
- Lila Downs
- Laura Esquivel
- Emilio (El Indio) Fernández
- Adolfo Gilly
- Jorge Ibargüengoitia
- Frida Kahlo
- Diego Luna
- Marina (La Malinche)
- Miguel Moreno Arreola
- Salvador Novo
- Zelia Nuttall
- Sergio Pitol
- Diego Rivera
- Carlos Salinas de Gortari
- Benjamin Travers
- Leon Trotsky
- Soberano Jr.

== In popular culture ==
- The band Calexico named an instrumental track on their 2015 album Edge of the Sun "Coyoacán."

== Bibliography ==
- Noble, John (2000). Lonely Planet Mexico City. Oakland CA: Lonely Planet. ISBN 1-86450-087-5.
