= Escuela Mier y Pesado =

Location
- Coyoacán, Mexico City; Mexico

Information
- Enrollment: c.1370 (2014)

The Escuela Mier y Pesado is a school in Coyoacán, Mexico City operated by the Fundación Mier y Pesado, IAP. As of 2014 it has over 1,370 students in preschool through high school (preparatoria) levels.

The school building has over 40 classrooms, a library, a 200-person auditorium, five science laboratories, and four workshops. There are also three association football (soccer fields), 7,000 square metres (75,000 sq ft) yards, seven volleyball courts, and seven basketball courts.
