= State Bank of the Russian Empire =

Former Russian state financial institution

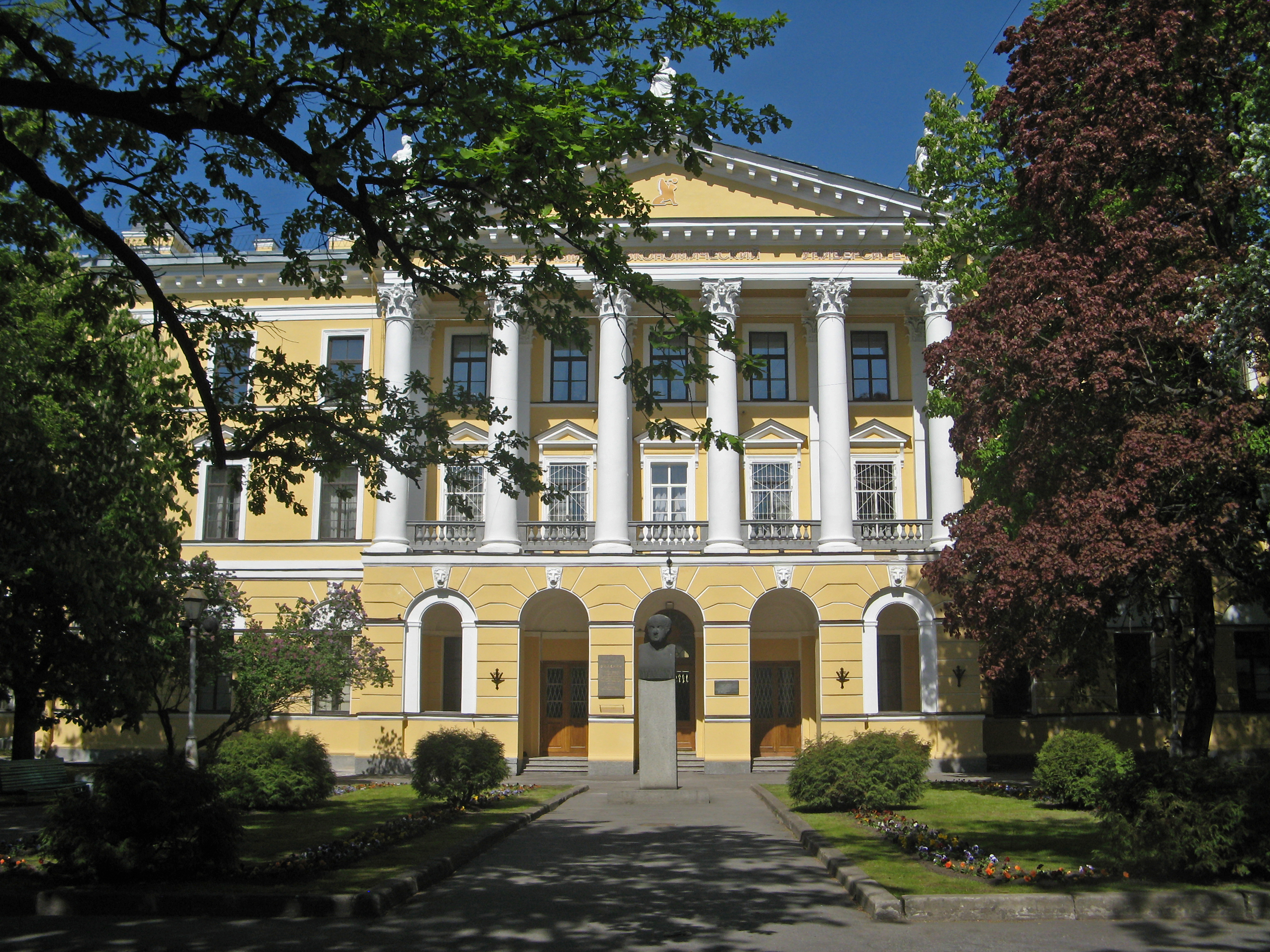
The former head office building of the State Bank, now the Saint Petersburg State University of Economics

The State Bank of the Russian Empire (Russian: Государственный банк Российской Империи) was the dominant financial institution of the Russian Empire from its founding in 1860 until the Empire's end in 1917.

A public bank headquartered in Saint Petersburg, it initially coexisted within the Empire with the Bank Polski until the latter was deprived of its residual monetary role in 1870, and with the Bank of Finland which soon defined a separate monetary zone for the Finnish markka. In 1897, with the Russian adoption of the gold standard, the State Bank fully took the attributes of a central bank, while keeping a significant additional role of commercial and development lending that made it the main source of credit to the Russian economy.

During the Russian Revolution, the State Bank forcibly absorbed the former business of all Russia's private-sector banks, was renamed People's Bank (Russian: Народный банк), then was liquidated in January 1920. After an extended gap during the era of war communism, it was eventually revived in Russia as the Soviet Gosbank in October 1921, whereas other organizations took central banking roles in newly independent Estonia, Latvia, Lithuania, and Poland, as well as Bessarabia within Greater Romania.

== Creation and early years ==
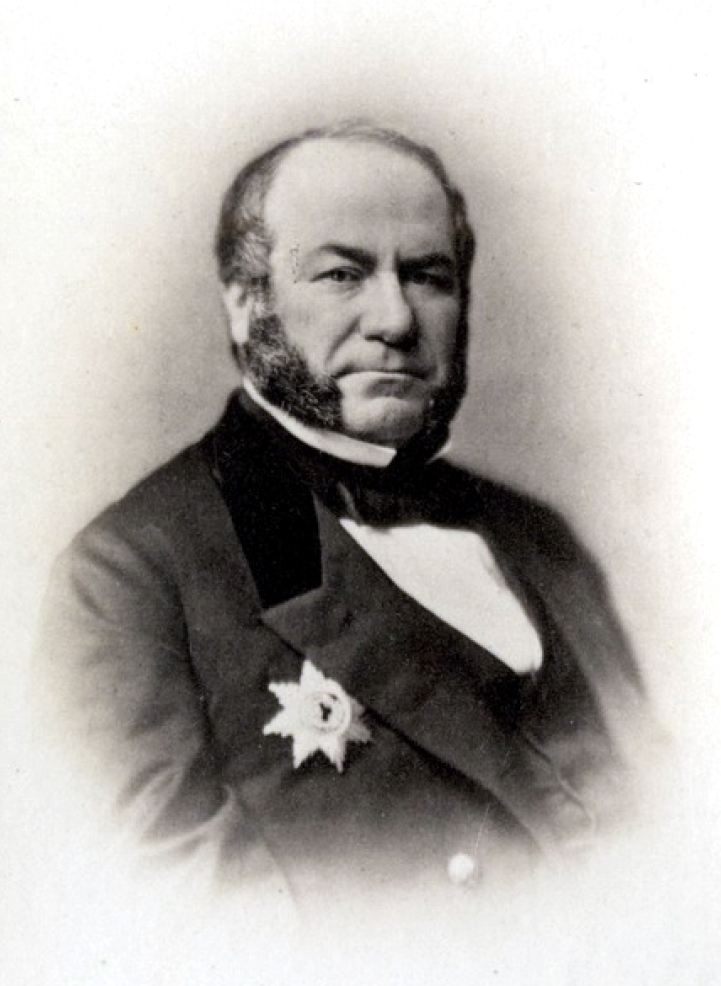
1865 portrait of Alexander von Stieglitz (1814–1884), the first Governor of the State Bank

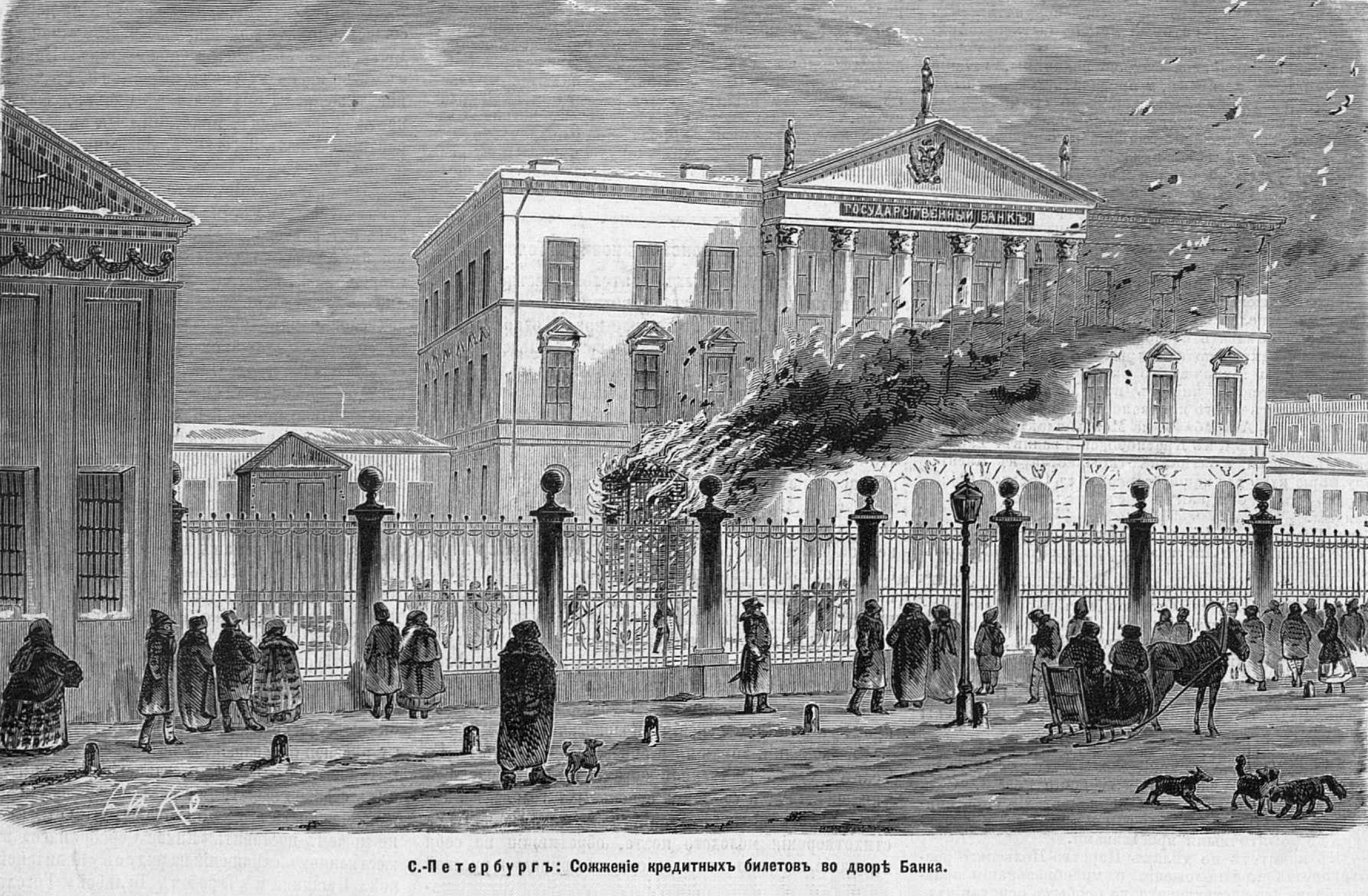
Burning of retired banknotes in front of the State Bank, 1870

Following the inflation that led to the abolition of the Russian Assignation Bank, Russia from 1818 onwards did not have a bank of issue of its own. After the deflationary 1820s and 1830s, the finance ministry's State Credit Note Bureau was established in 1843 and printed paper money distributed by the State Commercial Bank, but from January 1855 these were no longer backed by silver reserves. The state-owned banking system, including the State Commercial Bank and the State Loan Bank, collapsed in a bank run in 1858–1859.

The State Bank of the Russian Empire was established on 12 June [O.S. 31 May] 1860 at the behest of Minister of Finance Alexander Knyazhevich by ukaz of Emperor Alexander II. This ukaz also ratified the statutes of the State Bank. The bank was subordinate to the Ministry of Finance and was under the supervision of the Council of State Credit Institutions. It was the only state-owned central bank of its era, together with the Sveriges Riksbank and the Bank of Finland, which predated it within the Empire. It was also the largest credit institution in the Empire. Its first Governor was Russian Jewish financier Alexander von Stieglitz.

According to the statutes, the State Bank was intended for short-term credit (no more than 9 months) to trade and industry as well as a monetary role. In its first decade of operations, the State Bank invested most of its resources in state bonds and state-guaranteed securities. In addition, it issued short-term and long-term loans to the State Treasury. By 1879, the Treasury's debt to the State Bank amounted to 478.9 million rubles. The repayment of that debt, which began in 1881, ended in 1901. Lending to commercial and industrial turnover occurred mainly through discounting bills and issuing loans against bills. Until the mid-1870s, bill accounting averaged 30-50 million rubles. From the mid-1870s to the mid-1880s, transactions involving the accounting of trade bills doubled and averaged 100 million rubles. Ten years later, in 1890, they reached 152.5 million rubles. From 1867, the Ministry of Finance began intensive accumulation of gold reserves. By decree of Alexander II of June 2, 1867, the State Bank and its offices were granted the right to accept specie for payments. It was allowed to take Russian and foreign coins, as well as gold and silver bullion. Prices were set by the State Bank. The coin was sent to his change fund. As a result, during 1867-1876 the exchange fund increased from 78.3 million rubles to 310.1 million rubles.

The State Bank carried out an operation to liquidate the accounts of pre-reform state banks, a mission which was prominently entrusted to it by the charter and was only completed in 1887. These included the State Commercial Bank and State Loan Bank. The State bank had to pay interest and reimburse principal on those deposits that remained after the free exchange of deposit notes for 5 percent bank notes, payment of interest on coupons of 5 percent bank notes and capital on notes intended for redemption. To cover these expenses, the State Bank had to transfer interest and amounts received from borrowers of the old banks, as well as the amounts of payments from the State Treasury on the debt to its pre-reform banks. All liquidation operations were to be carried out at the expense of the State Treasury, which, if necessary, was to provide the bank, in addition to its initial capital, with cash or its interest-bearing obligations with the right to sell them on the stock exchange. But due to the constant budget deficit, the State Treasury was not able to provide additional funds to the State Bank, and the bank was forced to annually allocate part of its commercial profits to these operations. The liquidation operations began to produce surplus income only in 1872. In January 1887, the special account for the liquidation of former state banks was abolished. Proceeds from loans and profits from the State Bank from this operation began to be used for the current needs of the treasury.

The State Bank in its first decades was not a genuine central bank, because it could not make independent decisions on critical monetary matters such as issuing notes. Instead, it could only issue banknotes at the order of the finance ministry, which was therefore effectively in charge of Russia's monetary policy until the reforms of the 1890s.

== Economic interventionism ==
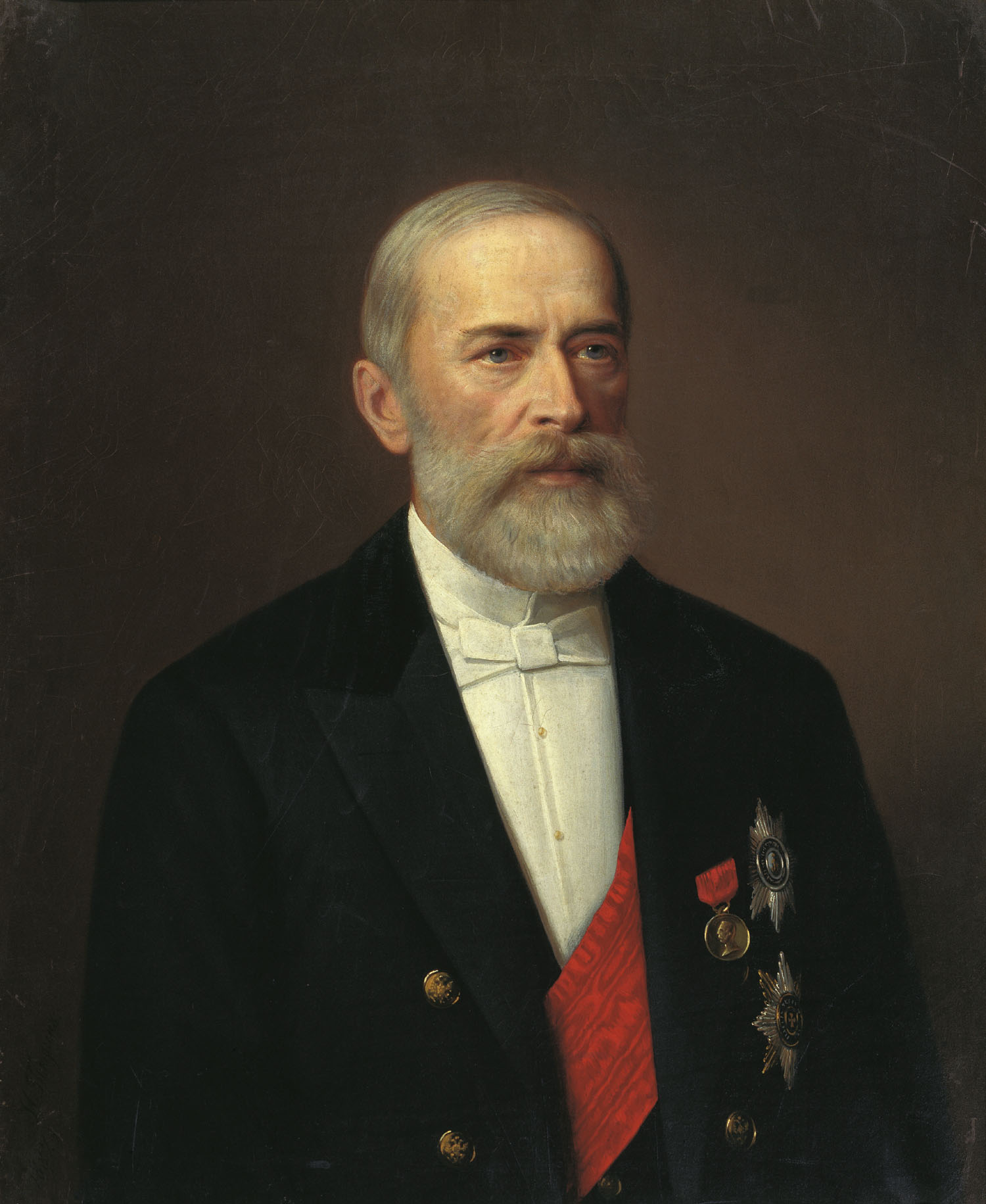
Nikolai von Bunge in 1887

Following the appointment of Nikolai von Bunge as Finance Minister in 1881, the State Bank stopped issuing loans to the State Treasury "for current needs", as Bunge introduced the practice of concluding government loans to cover the budget deficit. The Treasury began to repay its debt to the State Bank in 1881. A decree of January 1, 1881 announced the cessation of issuing banknotes and a reduction in their number in circulation. However, in 1882 an economic crisis broke out and lasted for almost five years. As a result, for 1881-1886, instead of 300 million rubles as initially planned, only 87 million rubles were written off from the balance sheet of the State Bank. Only in 1896 did the Bank's expenses at the expense of the Treasury for the first time equal the amounts of the Treasury invested in it. The Treasury's debt to the State Bank was fully repaid in 1901, in accordance with a decree of Nicholas II of April 28, 1900, which ordered the State Treasury to repay the balance of its debt to the State Bank in the amount of 50 million rubles.

In line with interventionist economic policy from the mid-1870s, the State Bank began to carry out operations to save shaky and bankrupt banks and some non-financial enterprises. The State Bank's actions thus mitigated the impact of the banking crises of the mid-1870s and early 1880s and supported financial stability. The main capital and provincial commercial banks were bailed out. In the mid-1880s, the State Bank was involved in supporting and rescuing mutual credit societies. Their debt to the Bank in 1887 reached 6.2 million rubles. Urban public banks in major cities were also bailed out. From 1886, the State Bank began to intensively subsidize the Peasants' Land Bank and the Nobles' Land Bank. These banks received funds for their operations as a result of issuing mortgage notes. Losses that arose during their implementation were paid by the State Bank from the treasury.

== Charter renewal of 1894 ==
On June 6, 1894, Finance Minister Sergei Witte initiated reform of the State Bank with the adoption of a new charter that directed it to more intensive lending to trade and industry, especially agriculture. The bank's fixed capital was increased to 50 million rubles, and its reserve capital to 5 million rubles (it had been 15 million rubles for fixed capital and 3 million rubles for reserve capital at creation in 1860). The mandate of the State Bank, was changed from "revitalizing trade turnover" to "facilitating money circulation, promoting domestic trade, industry and agriculture through short-term credit". In addition, as before, the State Bank was mandated to contribute to the "strengthening of the monetary credit system". The State Bank's discounting operation was extended to bills issued for commercial and industrial purposes, while their term was increased to 12 months. Loans to industrial enterprises could reach up to 500 thousand rubles, and be issued for a period of up to two years. The State Bank was given the right to issue loans against solo bills secured by a pledge of real estate, a pledge of agricultural and factory equipment, a surety, or security determined by the Minister of Finance. The new charter made changes to governance, by which the State Bank was removed from the supervision of the Council of State Credit Institutions and placed under the supervision of the State Audit Office. The general management of the State Bank was entrusted to a Council which replaced the previous board and to the Governor. The Council included the director of the Special Chancellery for Credit, a member from the State Control, fellow bank managers, the manager of the St. Petersburg office of the bank, members from the Ministry of Finance (their number was not limited), one member from the nobility and one from the merchants. The Chairman of the Council of the State Bank was its Governor.

The growth of commercial operations in the State Bank, which began a year before the adoption of the new charter, was short-lived and ended in 1896. During this period, discounting operations almost tripled. There was, albeit on a smaller scale, an increase in special current accounts and interest-bearing loans. Commodity loans to rural owners almost tripled from 9.2 million to 29.8 million rubles, and loans to industrial enterprises almost doubled from 8.8 million to 16.7 million rubles.

== Monetary reform of 1895–1898 ==
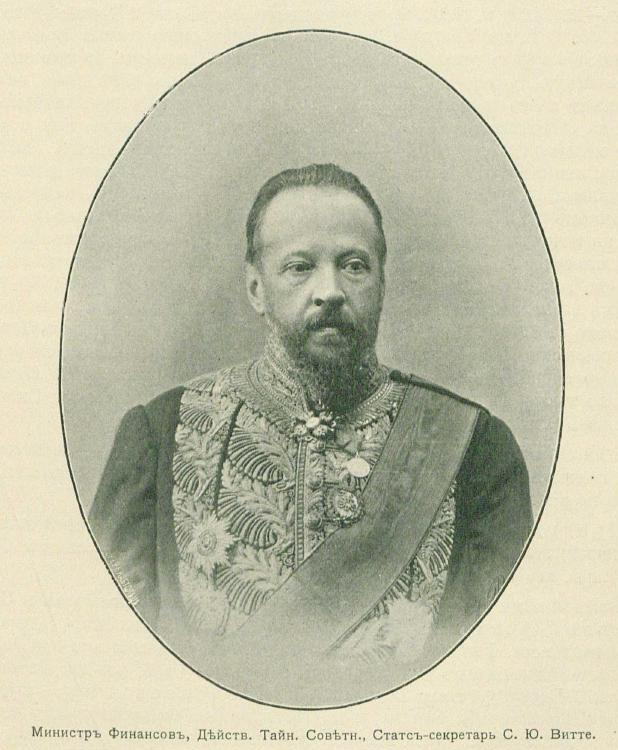
Sergei Witte, around 1900–1902

Witte started a new cycle of monetary reform just a year after the new charter, the highlight of which was Russia's adoption of the gold standard in 1897. During this reform, the State Bank's task was centered on money issuance and monetary policy. At the beginning of 1895, Russia's gold reserves amounted to 911.6 million rubles; stabilization of the market exchange rate occurred in 1893–1895. A decree of Nicholas II of 9 September [O.S. 28 August] 1897 granted the State Bank a formal monopoly over note issuance in the Russian Empire while preserving its capacity to engage in ordinary lending. The text stated: "State credit notes are issued by the State Bank in an amount strictly limited by the urgent needs of monetary circulation, backed by gold; the amount of gold backing the notes must be at least half of the total amount of credit notes issued in circulation, when the latter does not exceed 600 million rubles. Credit notes in circulation exceeding 600 million rubles must be backed in gold at least one ruble per ruble, so that for every 15 rubles in credit notes there is a corresponding backing of at least one imperial in gold."

The State Bank was primarily directed to ensure the stability of the new monetary system, and subsequently was very restrained in its lending and credit activity despite the permissive provisions of the 1894 charter in that area. In the second half of the 1890s, the entire attention of the Ministry of Finance and the State Bank was focused on strengthening the metal reserves by compressing the bank's active operations. For example, between 1 January 1896 and 1 January 1899, the discounting of bills and the issuance of loans on special current accounts against bills decreased from 215 to 170 million rubles; the issuance of commercial loans from 49 to 22 million rubles; and other loans from 55 to 31 million rubles.

== Late-tsarist instability and foreign borrowing ==
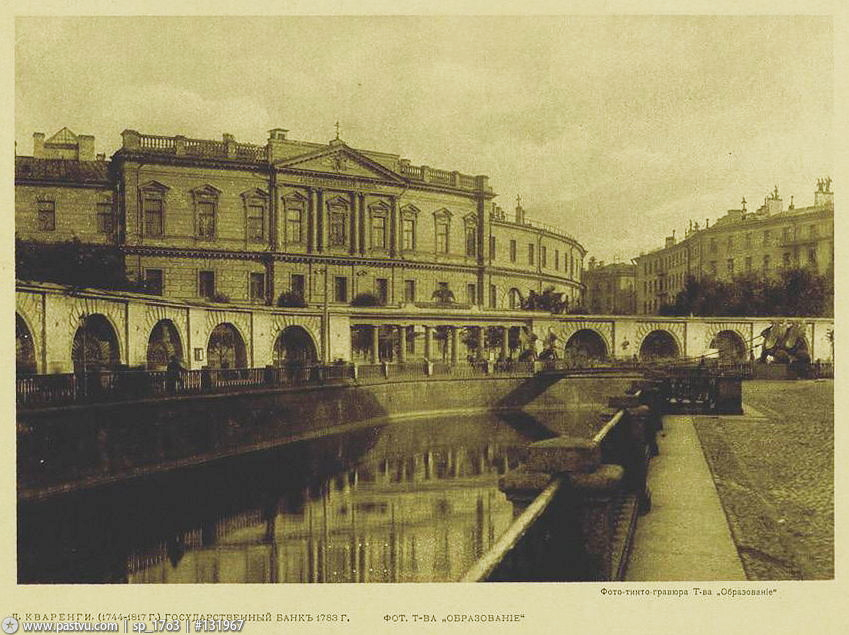
View of the State Bank building from across Griboyedov Canal in 1905, with the Bank Bridge on the left

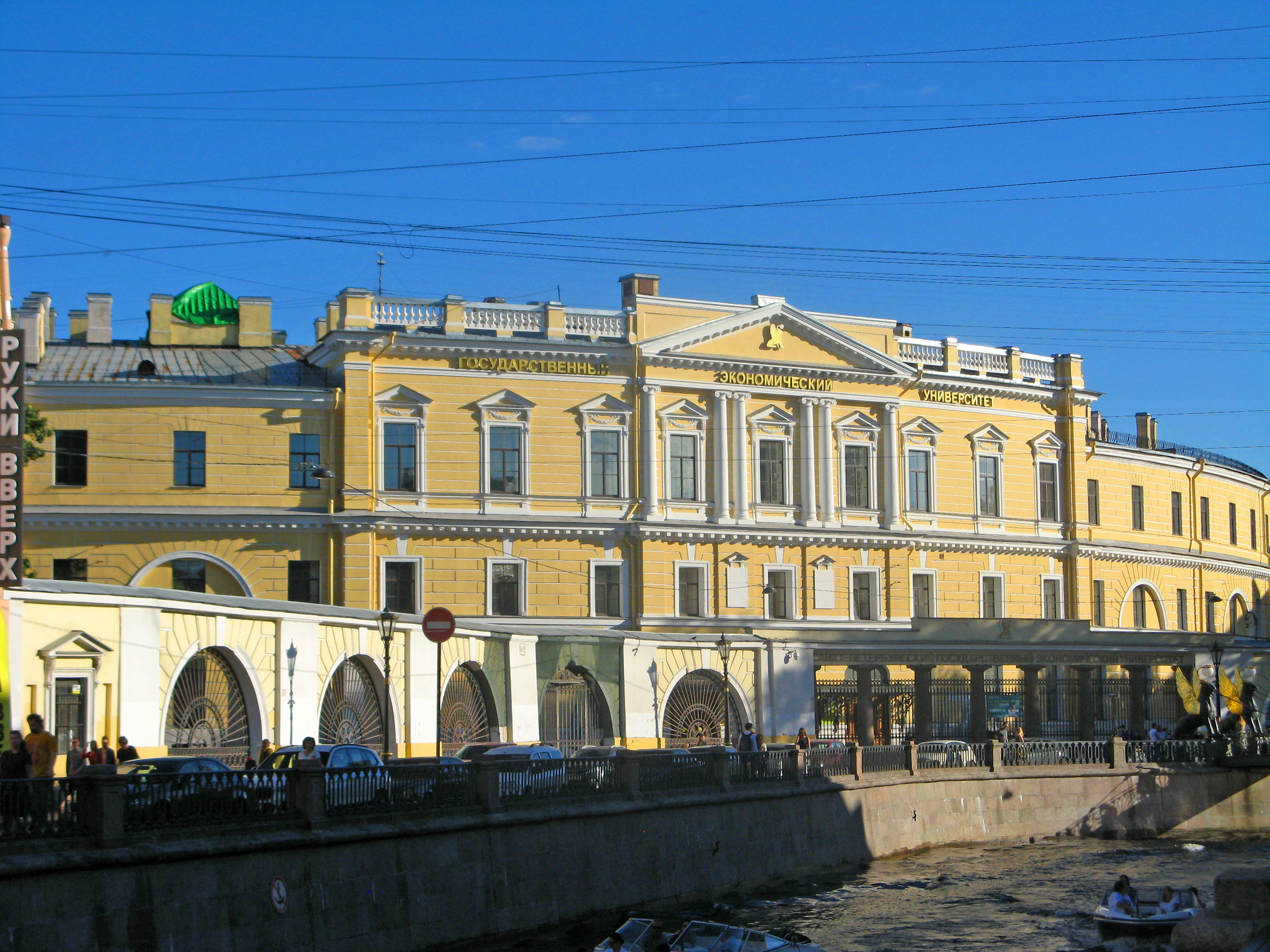
The same building in 2020

Operations with government securities developed significantly during that period, with a volume several times greater than the bank's own capital. The Ministry of Finance and the State Bank actively intervened in the markets to maintain the exchange rate of government securities and the "credit ruble". From the late 1890s, market intervention and significant investments in securities have also been used to counteract the fall in industrial and banking stock prices. The State Bank, together with a number of joint-stock banks, began to create exchange syndicates and banking consortia to support the rates of Russian securities during economic crises. One of these exchange syndicates was created during the industrial and financial crisis of 1899–1903. In 1906, during the crisis, a banking consortium began operating to provide financial assistance to domestic banks and enterprises. In 1912, due to the fall in stock prices, a banking syndicate was created, which for two years bought up shares of the largest enterprises and commercial banks.

The crisis intervention resulted in the expansion of the State Bank's balance sheet, partly reversing the monetary reform of the late 1890s. By 1 January 1902, State Bank transactions for discounting bills and issuing loans on special current accounts rose to 329, million rubles, commercial loans to 47 million rubles, and other loans to 58 million rubles. In most cases, the loans were "exceptional", namely they were of a non-statutory nature. The gold reserves of the State Bank decreased from 1899 to 1902 from 1,008 to 709 million rubles. These developments were soon followed by the Russo-Japanese War and the Revolution of 1905, leaving the financial system in poor condition. In 1906, Russia's commitment to the Gold standard was on the verge of collapse. Mass political rallies and strikes at the end of 1905, in which employees of the State Bank also took part, caused the departure of French bankers from St. Petersburg, who had come there to negotiate the next loan.

There was an increased demand for deposits in gold and the presentation of credit notes for exchange for gold. Despite the increase in the official discount rate to 8 percent, the demand for credit from commercial and industrial enterprises increased significantly. The inability of joint-stock commercial banks to satisfy this demand due to the strong outflow of deposits from them forced the State Bank to increase its accounting and lending operations in order to avoid mass bankruptcy. That situation triggered gold outflows. From 16 October to 1 December 1905, the gold fund of the State Bank decreased from 1,319 to 1,126 million rubles. By 19 December 1905, the gold backing of credit rubles had fallen below the limit prescribed by the 1897 legislation. The crisis was overcome only thanks to a French loan of 100 million rubles in January 1906, itself refinanced with another loan concluded in April of the same year.

The State Bank's intensive rediscounting of bills of private banks, which was a measure to combat the crisis in 1905–1906, became a main activity of the Bank in subsequent years. The State Bank thus increasingly became a "bank of banks". The total debt of private banks to the State Bank was 37 million rubles at the beginning of 1910, then increased to 342 million rubles in 1912.

Through that period, the State Bank became one of the largest European credit institutions. Its balance almost doubled between 1905 and 1914. The source of funds for its operations were issues of notes and treasury funds. Deposits and current accounts of individuals and institutions remained at the level of 1903 and averaged 250 million rubles. From the 1890s, the bank launched lending to the grain trade in the form of commodity loans. Since 1910, the State Bank, as part of state regulation of the grain campaign, began the construction of elevators and granaries. The creation of a state system of grain elevators was supposed to help reduce grain losses during transportation. At the beginning of 1917, the State Bank operated 42 grain elevators with a total volume of 26,000 thousand poods, and another 28 grain storage facilities were being built.

With the participation of the State Bank, a system of small credit institutions for lending to cooperatives, artisans and peasants was created in the country. In 1904, the Bank created the Office for Small Loans, which was supposed to monitor the activities of institutions of this type and provide them with financial assistance if necessary. Until the First World War, Russian financial policy extremely valued the preservation of gold currency as the basis of external government credit, largely from France. The gold coverage of the ruble was constantly maintained at a very high level. After the crisis year of 1906, it did not fall below 93 percent, and in 1909–1911 it was above 100 percent. This conservative stance enabled the influx of foreign capital necessary for the industrial development of the country.

== World War I and 1917 revolution ==
World War I resulted in elevated inflation in the Russian Empire. From 1 July 1914 to 1 March 1917, the outstanding amount of ruble notes in circulation increased from 1.63 billion up to 9.95 billion rubles. The State Bank financed military expenses by issuing loans to commercial banks, enterprises and institutions against long-term bonds and short-term treasury obligations. The state budget deficit in 1916 reached 13.8 billion rubles, of which 29 percent was covered by the issuance of paper money. In 1915, prices increased by 30 percent, then in 1916 by 100 percent. By the February Revolution in 1917, the ruble on the domestic market had depreciated almost fourfold, its purchasing power being 26-27 pre-war kopecks.

In 1917, the state budget deficit reached 22.6 million rubles. The methods of covering it included taxation, internal and external borrowing, and the printing of paper money. During the period from March to November 1917, the Provisional Government managed to collect 1.16 billion rubles in taxes. It issued a "Freedom Loan" for 3.7 billion rubles. These funds were used to fulfil regular expenditure items of the state budget. Military expenses, which amounted to 22.6 billion rubles in 1917, were covered by issuing paper money. The Provisional Government increased the banknote issue limit fivefold, bringing it to 16.5 billion rubles.

As a result, during its eight months in power, the Provisional Government issued approximately the same number of banknotes as was issued during the two and a half previous years of the war. The issue of notes during that period amounted to 6.4 billion rubles. Such a significant issue had the effect of accelerating the depreciation of money, which forced the government to resort to issuing notes in large denominations, but even so, there was not enough money in circulation. Rising prices and, consequently, an increase in the monetary expression of the commodity supply, hoarding of large banknotes by wealthy sections of the urban and especially rural population caused a lack of currecncy in circulation and imbalances in the banknote composition of the money supply. In August and September, that "money famine" took on the character of a crisis due to the seasonal expansion of trade turnover. In reaction, the Provisional Government allowed a number of securities into circulation as legal tender and began issuing banknotes of a simplified type, namely money stamps. Some cities and provinces began issuing their own means of payment. This started a process of disintegration of Russia's previously unified monetary system, which intensified the general disorganization and contributed to a further increase in inflation.

On 7 November [O.S. 25 October] 1917, the first day of the October Revolution, an armed detachment under direct orders from Lenin occupied the State Bank's head office. In December and January, all Russia's commercial banks were nationalized and forcibly merged into the State Bank with their shareholders wiped out; the State Bank was renamed the People's Bank in May 1918. The People Bank's was in turn liquidated in January 1920. There were no banks formally recognized in the country until the creation of the Gosbank in October 1921.

== Buildings ==
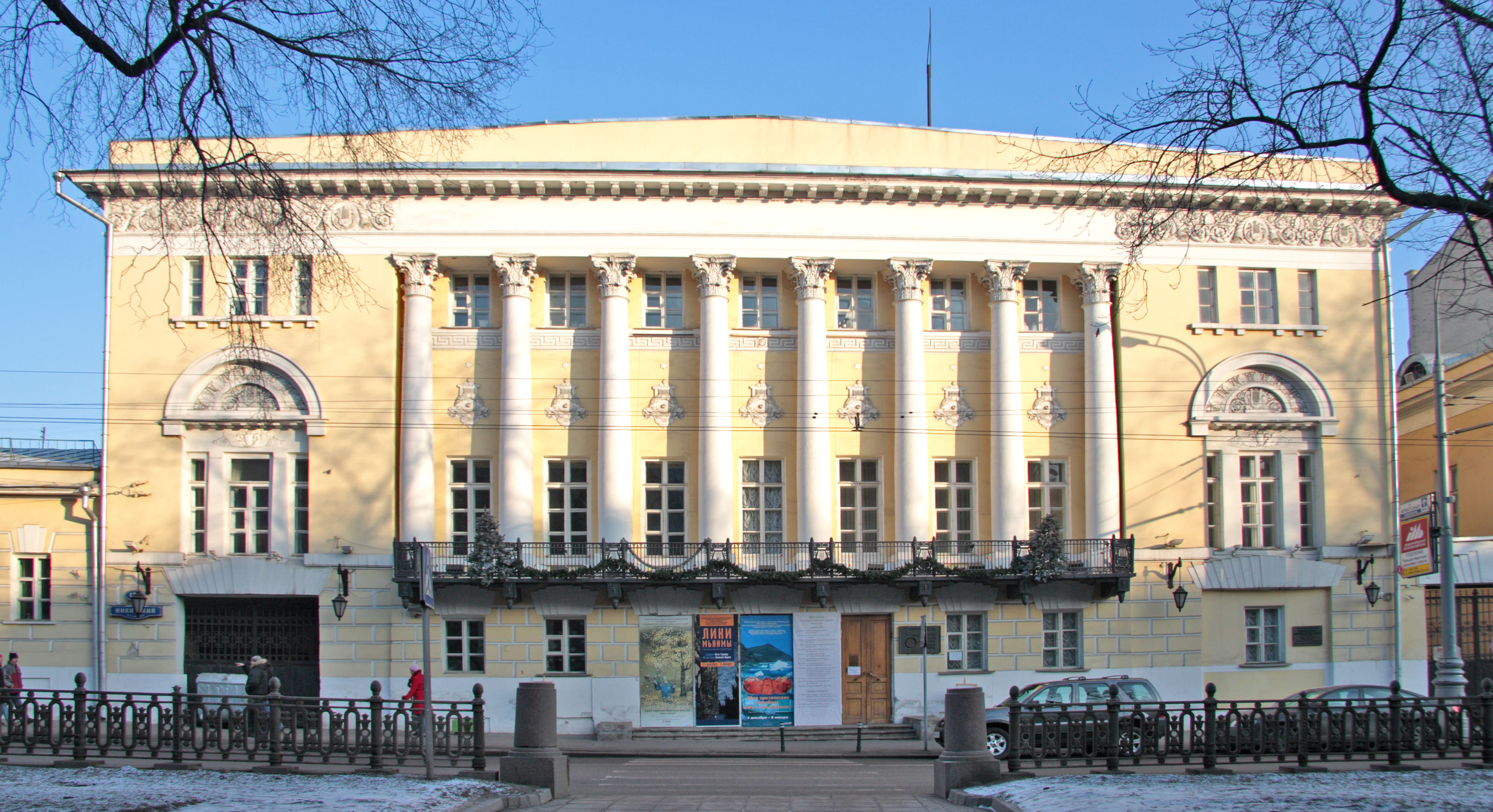
Lunins' House in Moscow, branch of the State Bank until 1894

In Saint Petersburg, the State Bank took over the former building of the Russian Assignation Bank, commissioned by Catherine the Great in 1782 and completed in 1789 on a design by architect Giacomo Quarenghi. At creation, the State Bank took over the former activity of the State Commercial Bank, including 7 local branches. It immediately opened its branches in Arkhangelsk, Kharkiv, Kyiv, Moscow, Odesa, Riga, Rostov-on-Don, and Yekaterinburg. In June 1864, 12 more branches of the State Bank were opened in Astrakhan, Chișinău, Ekaterinoslav, Kazan, Penza, Ryazan, Samara, Saratov, Tambov, Vladimir, Voronezh, and Yaroslavl. In the late 19th century, the State Bank erected branch buildings in cities across the Empire, often using a longitudinal building typology with a prominent avant-corps at the center; examples of the latter include the former branches in Moscow (built 1892–1893, arch. Konstantin Bykovsky; replaced the former branch in Lunins' House), Łódź (built 1905–1908, arch. Dawid Lande), Vilnius (built 1906–1909, arch. Mikhail Prozorov), and Warsaw (built 1907–1911, arch. Leon Benois). By the beginning of 1917, the State Bank included 11 main branches, 133 permanent and 5 temporary offices, 42 agencies at granaries. In addition, the State Bank managed banking operations carried out in 793 local treasury offices.

In Russia, the former head office was repurposed in the 1930s as the Saint Petersburg State University of Economics, but most of the other surviving State Bank buildings are still used by the Central Bank of Russia, including the former Moscow branch for its head office. In some of the countries that became independent either after World War I or after the dissolution of the Soviet Union, a former State Bank branch building has become the head office of the central bank, such as the Bank of Estonia in Tallinn (where the former State Bank branch has become part of a wider central bank complex), the Bank of Latvia in Riga, the Bank of Lithuania in Kaunas (which moved from there to a new building in 1928), the Bank of Poland in Warsaw during the Second Polish Republic (building destroyed during World War II), and the National Bank of Ukraine in Kyiv. In Łódź, Lublin and Vilnius, the State Bank buildings became branches of the Polish central bank; the former two are still used by the National Bank of Poland, whereas the later was transferred in the 1950s to the Lithuanian Academy of Sciences. Another case of repurposing is the Nikanor Onatsky Regional Art Museum in Sumy, Ukraine.

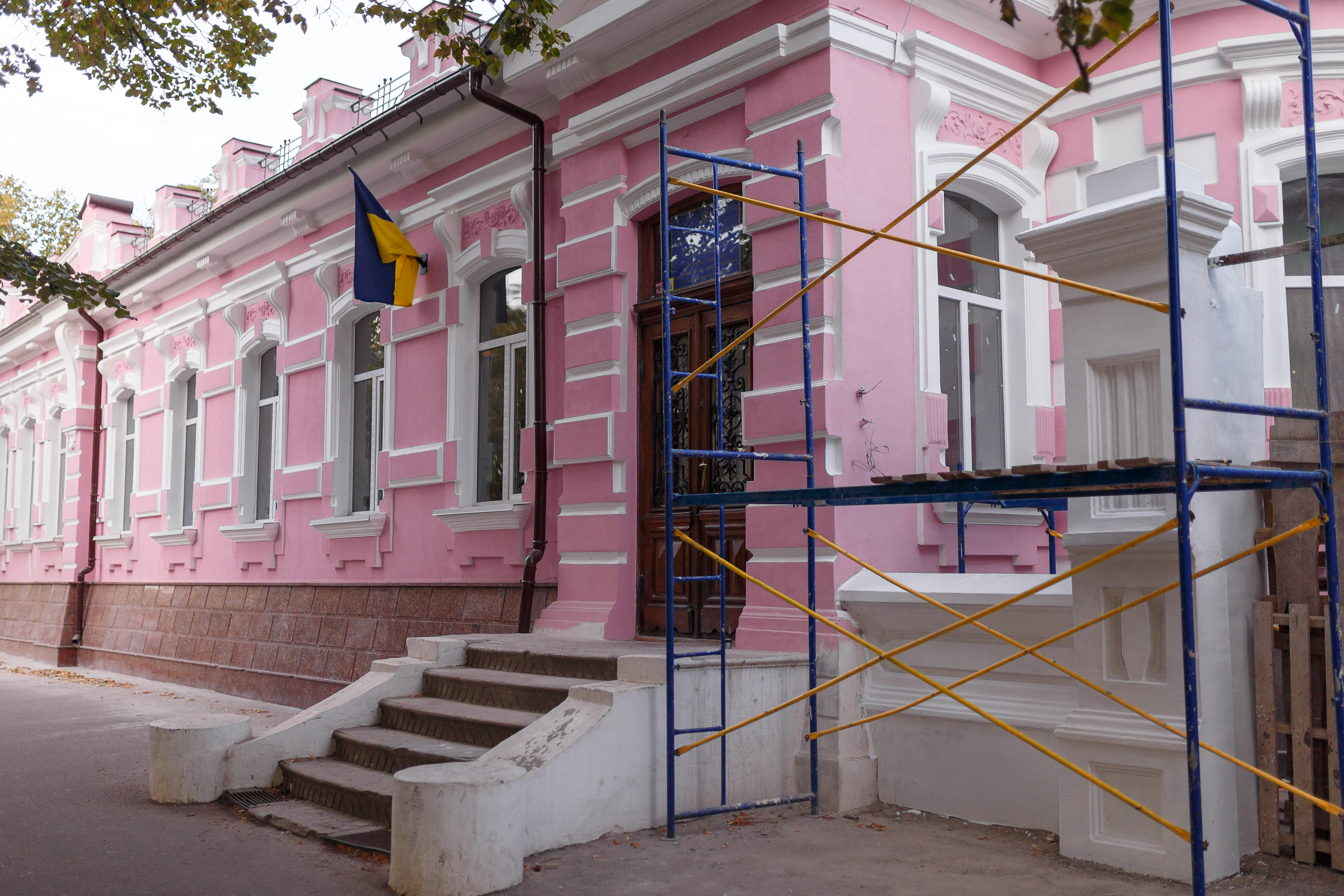
Former building in Izmail, Ukraine

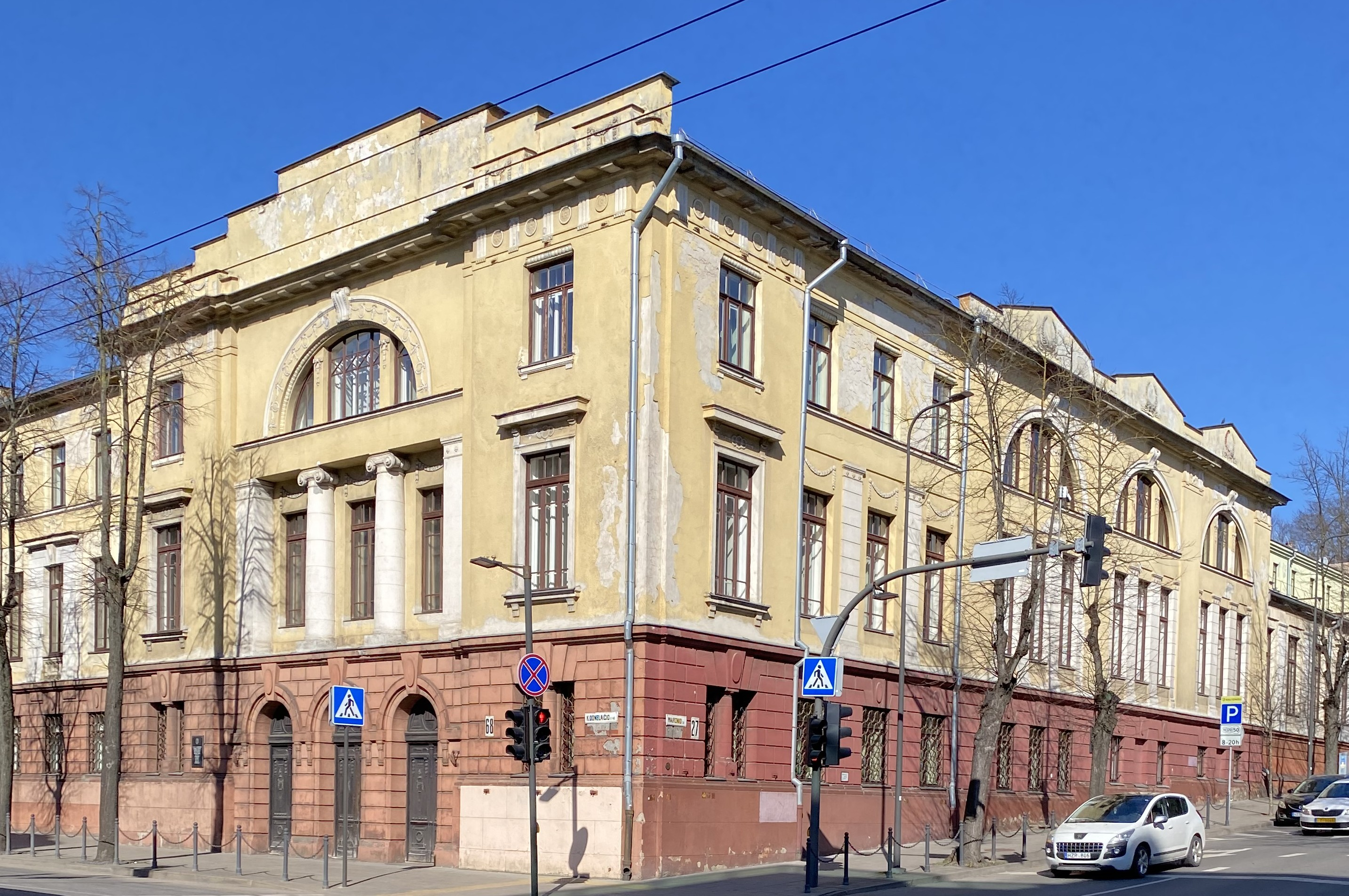
Former building in Kaunas, Lithuania

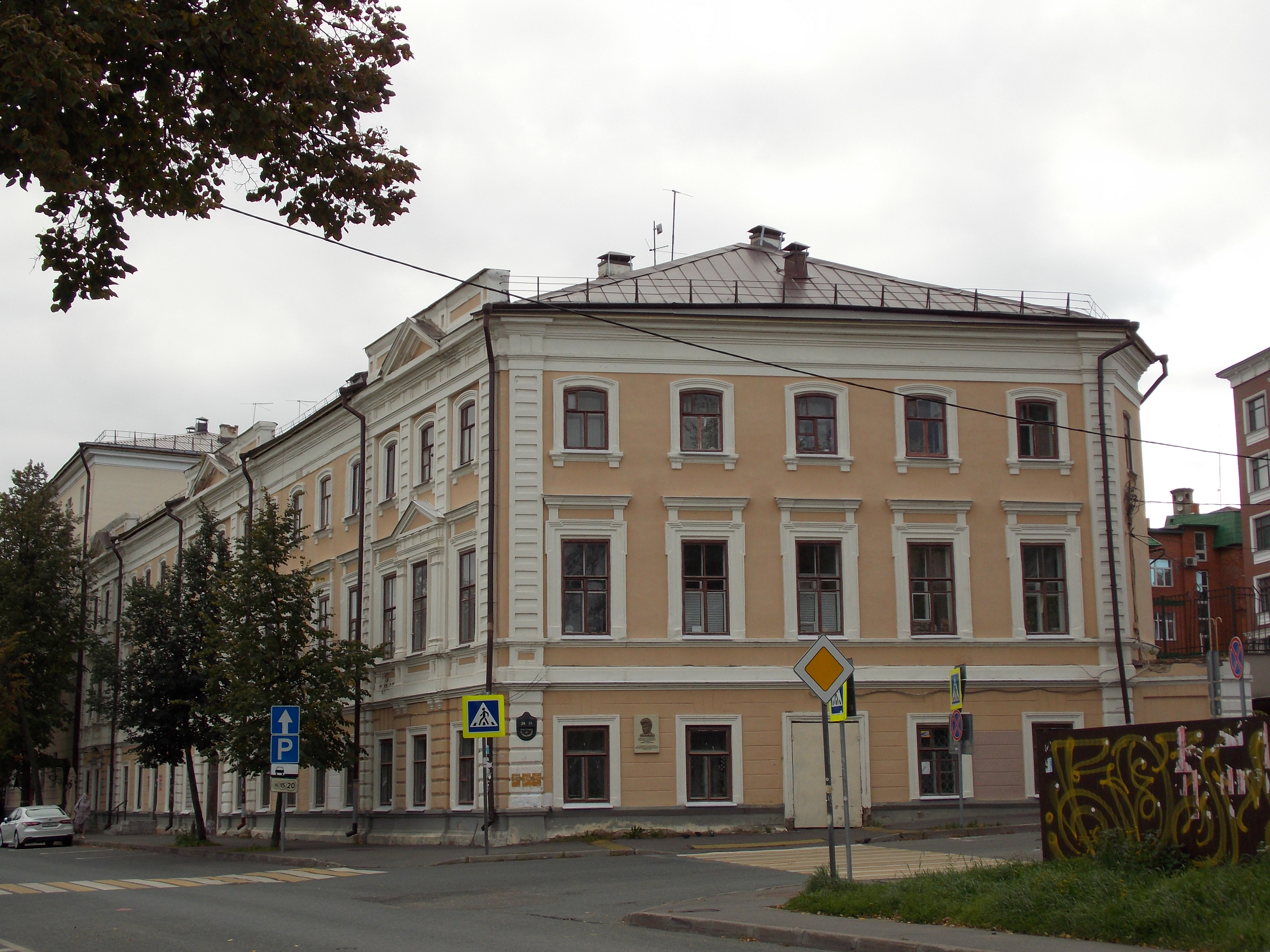
Former building in Kazan, Russia

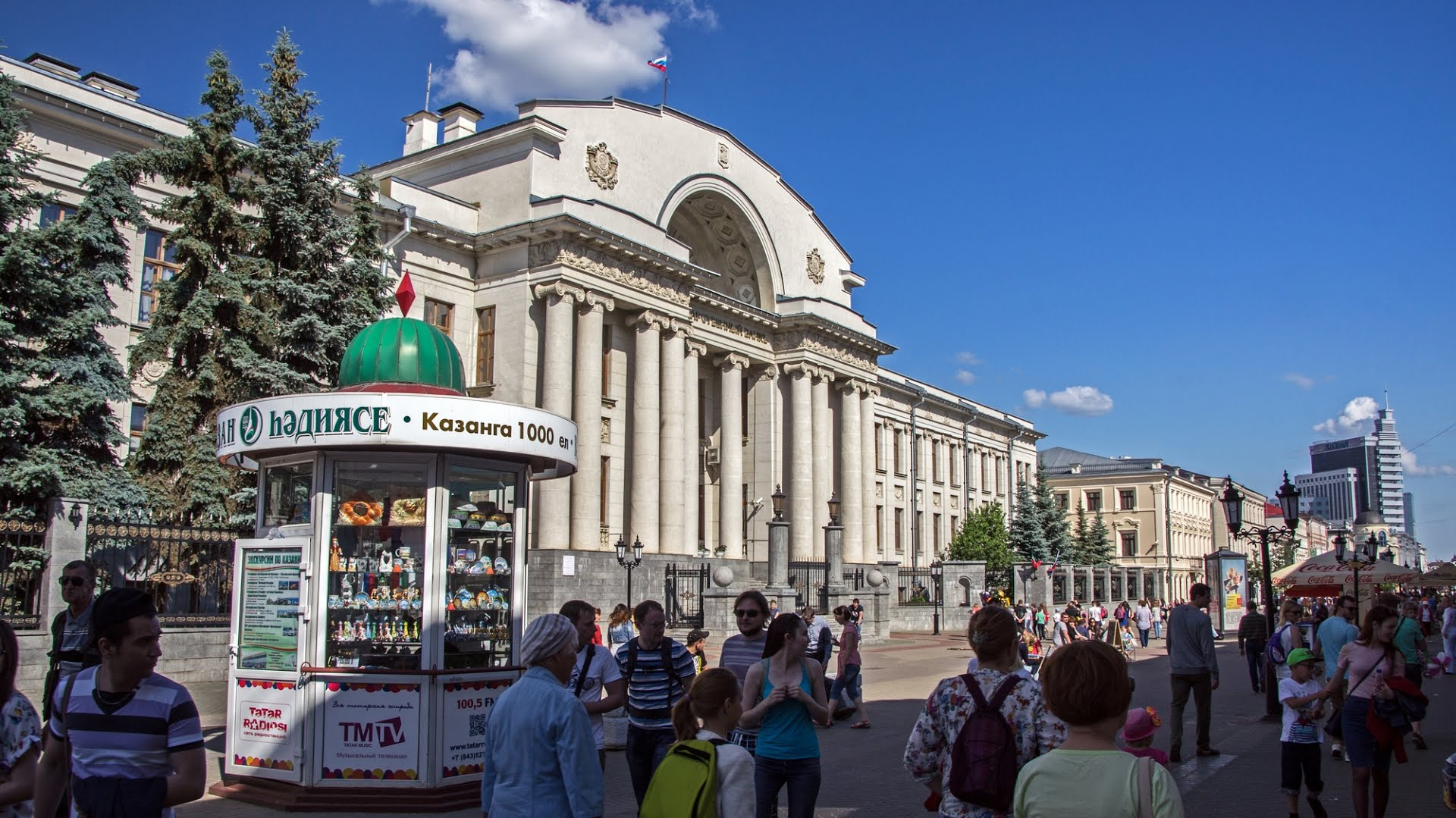
Later building in Kazan

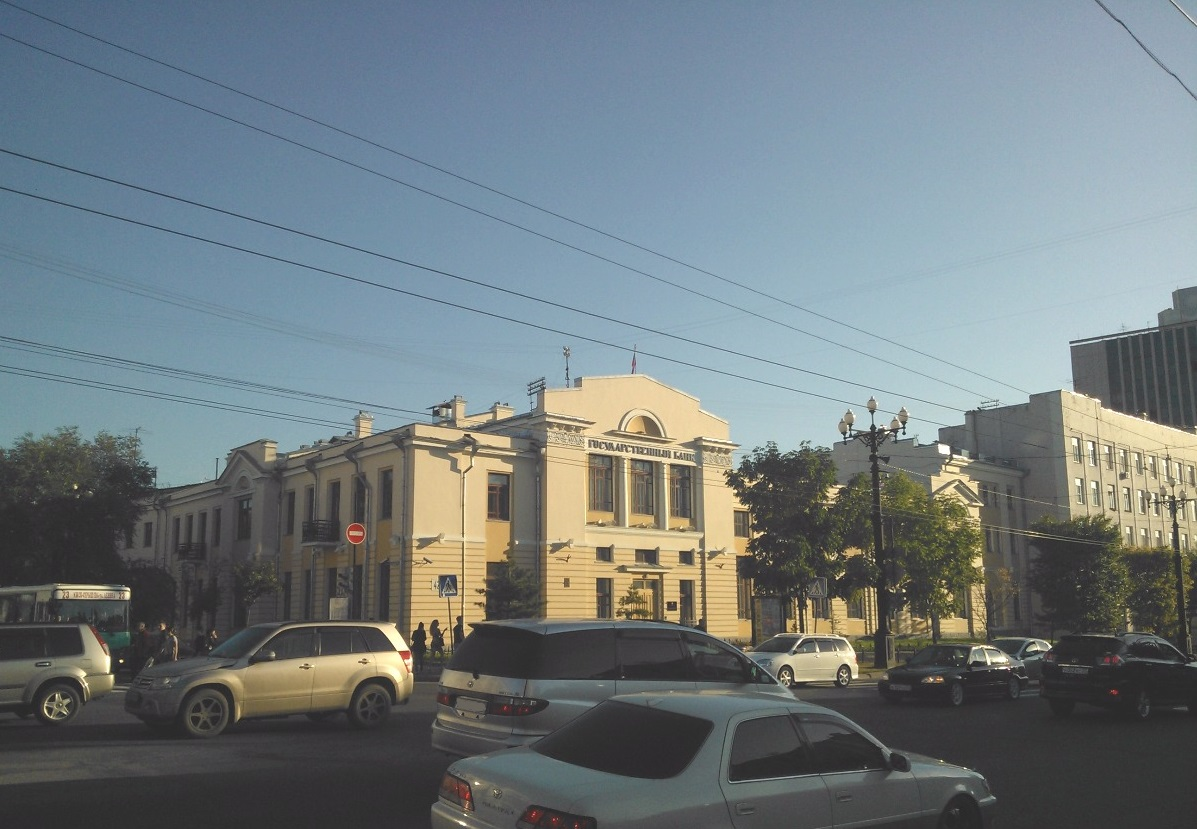
Former building in Khabarovsk, Russia

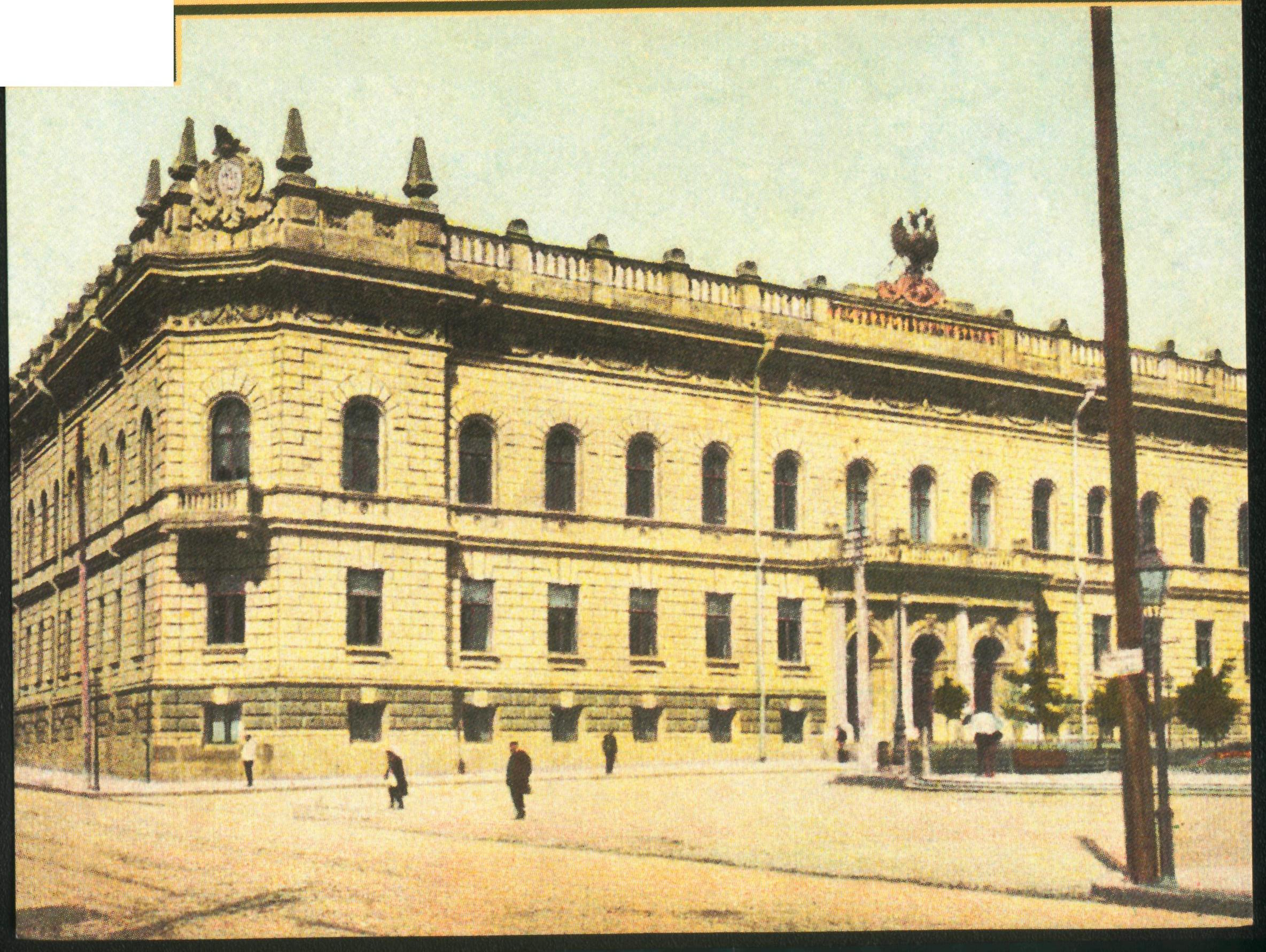
State Bank building in Kharkiv in 1900

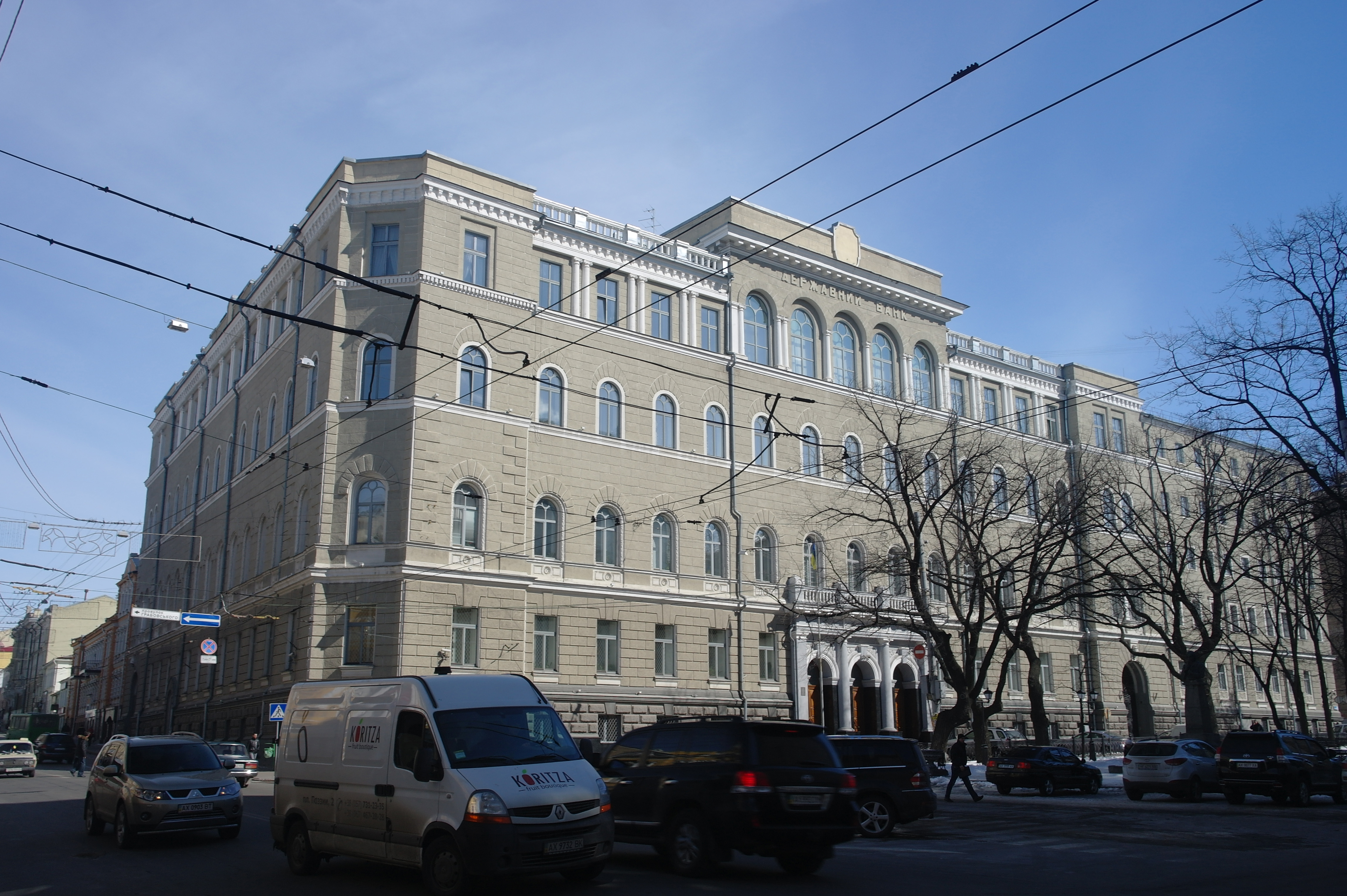
The same building in 2013 following multiple alterations

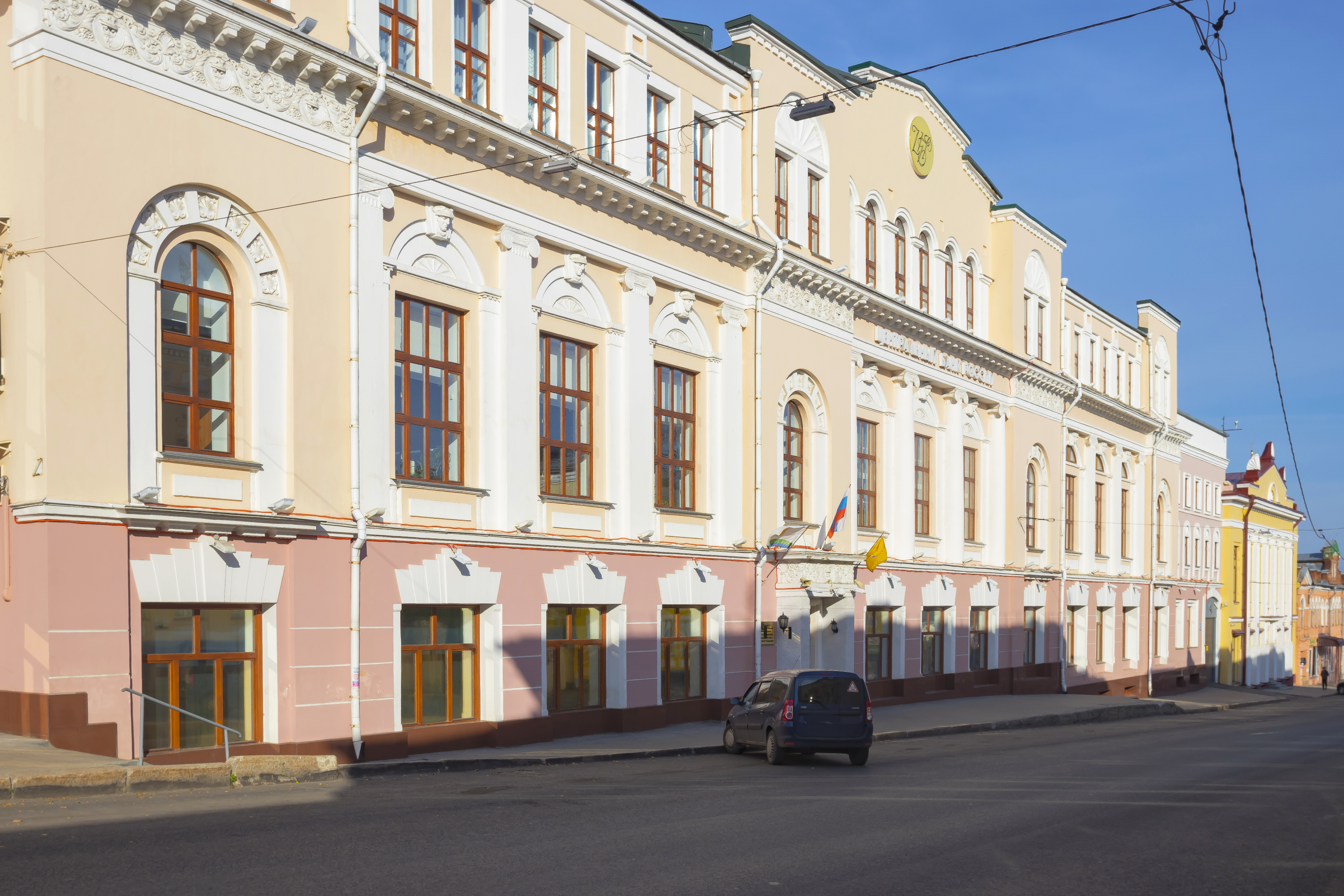
Former building in Kirov, Russia

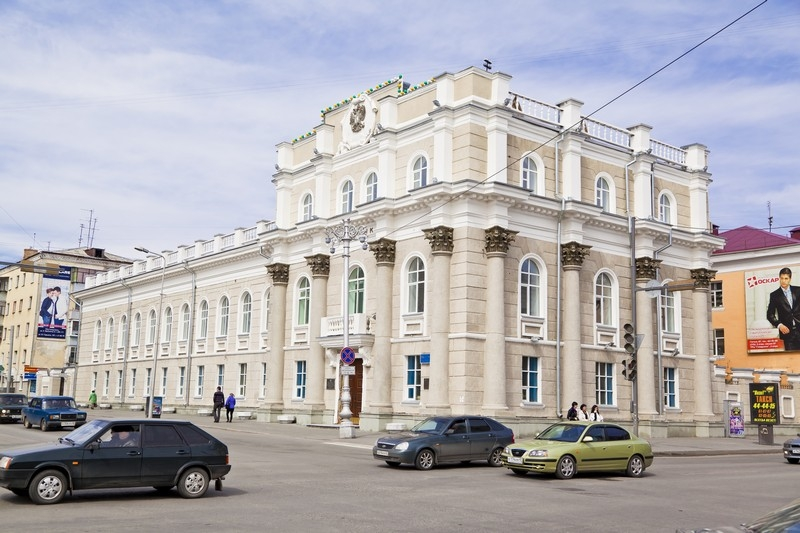
Former building in Kurgan, Russia

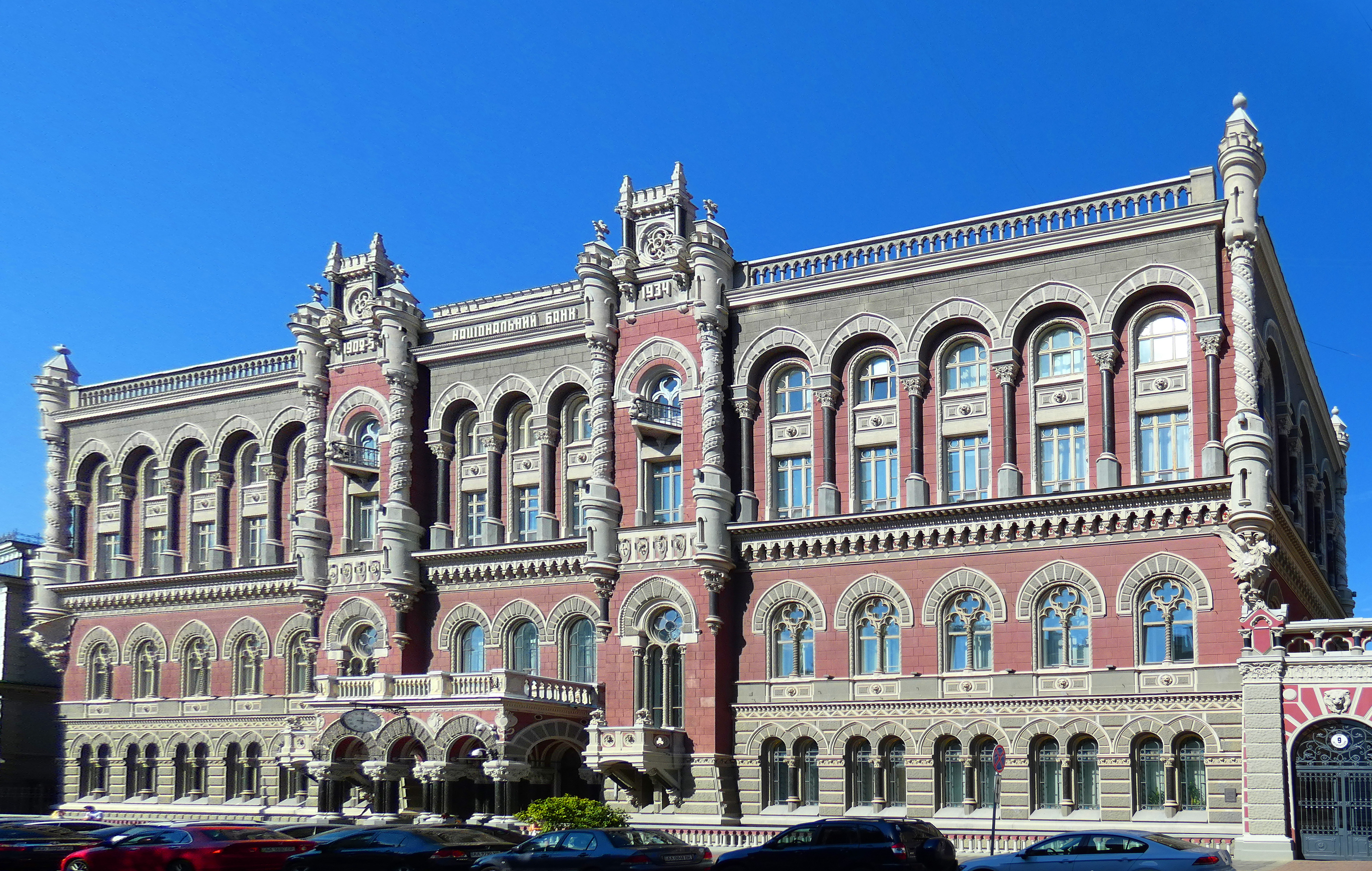
Former building in Kyiv, Ukraine

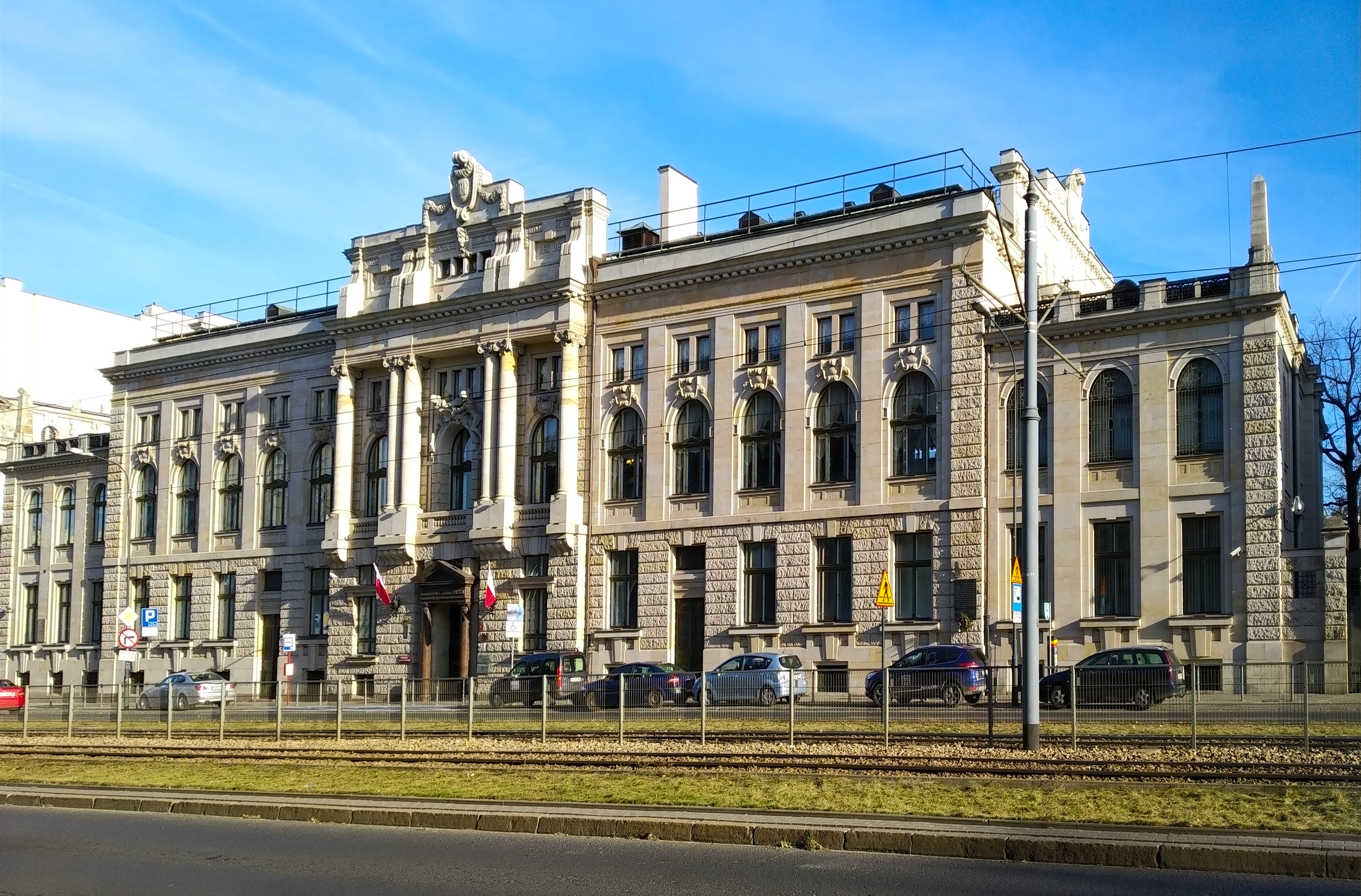
Former building in Łódź, Poland

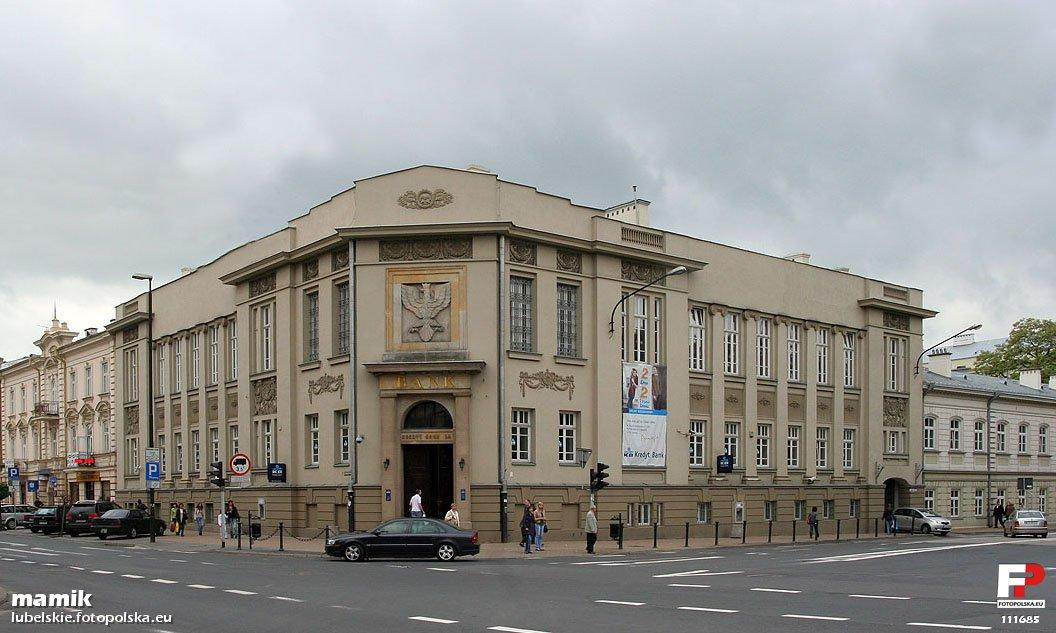
Former building in Lublin, Poland

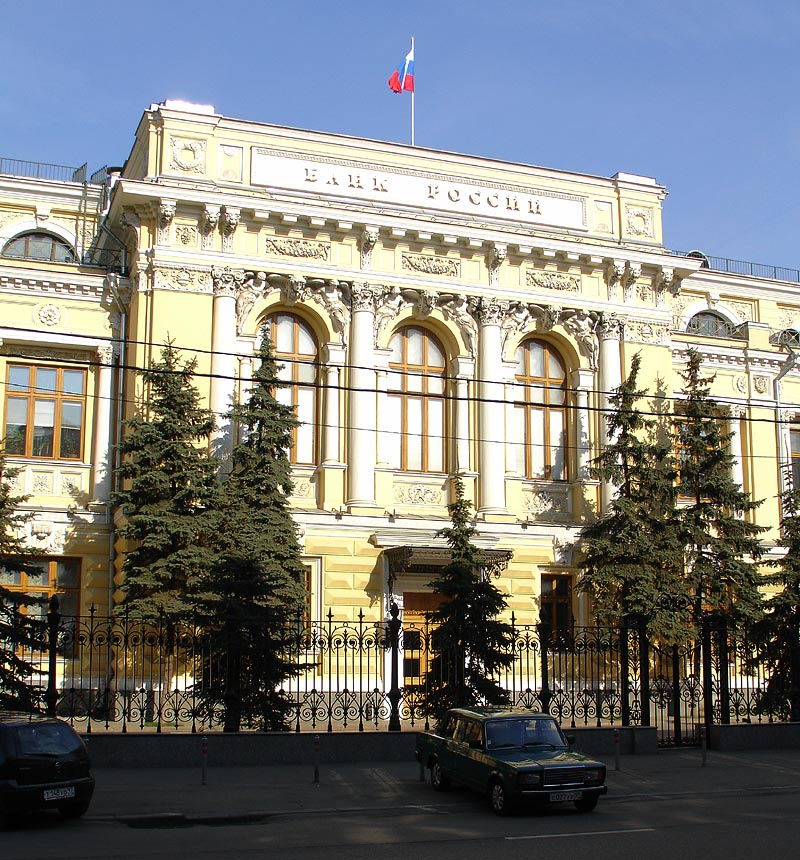
Former building in Moscow, Russia

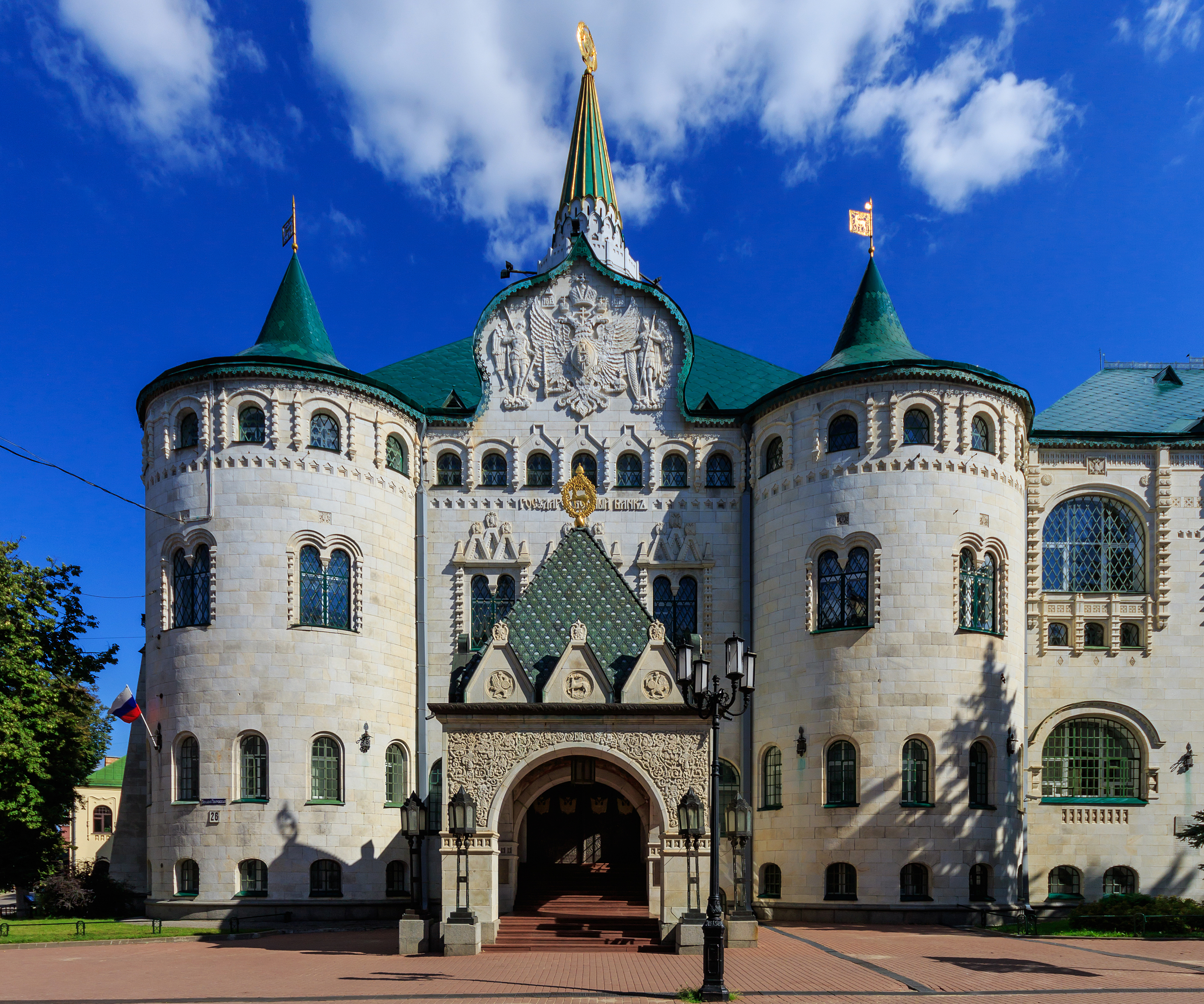
Former building in Nizhny Novgorod, Russia

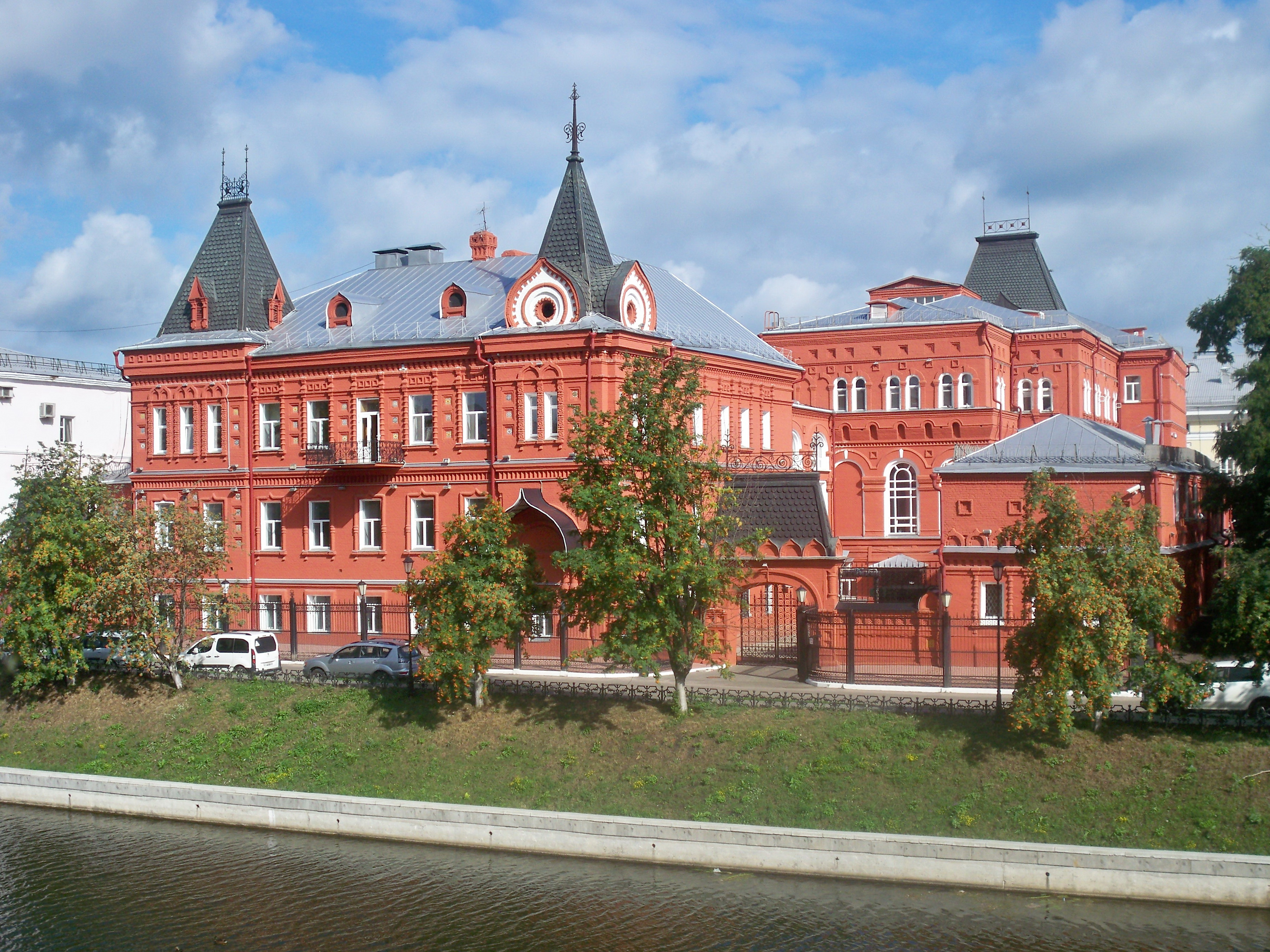
Former building in Oryol, Russia

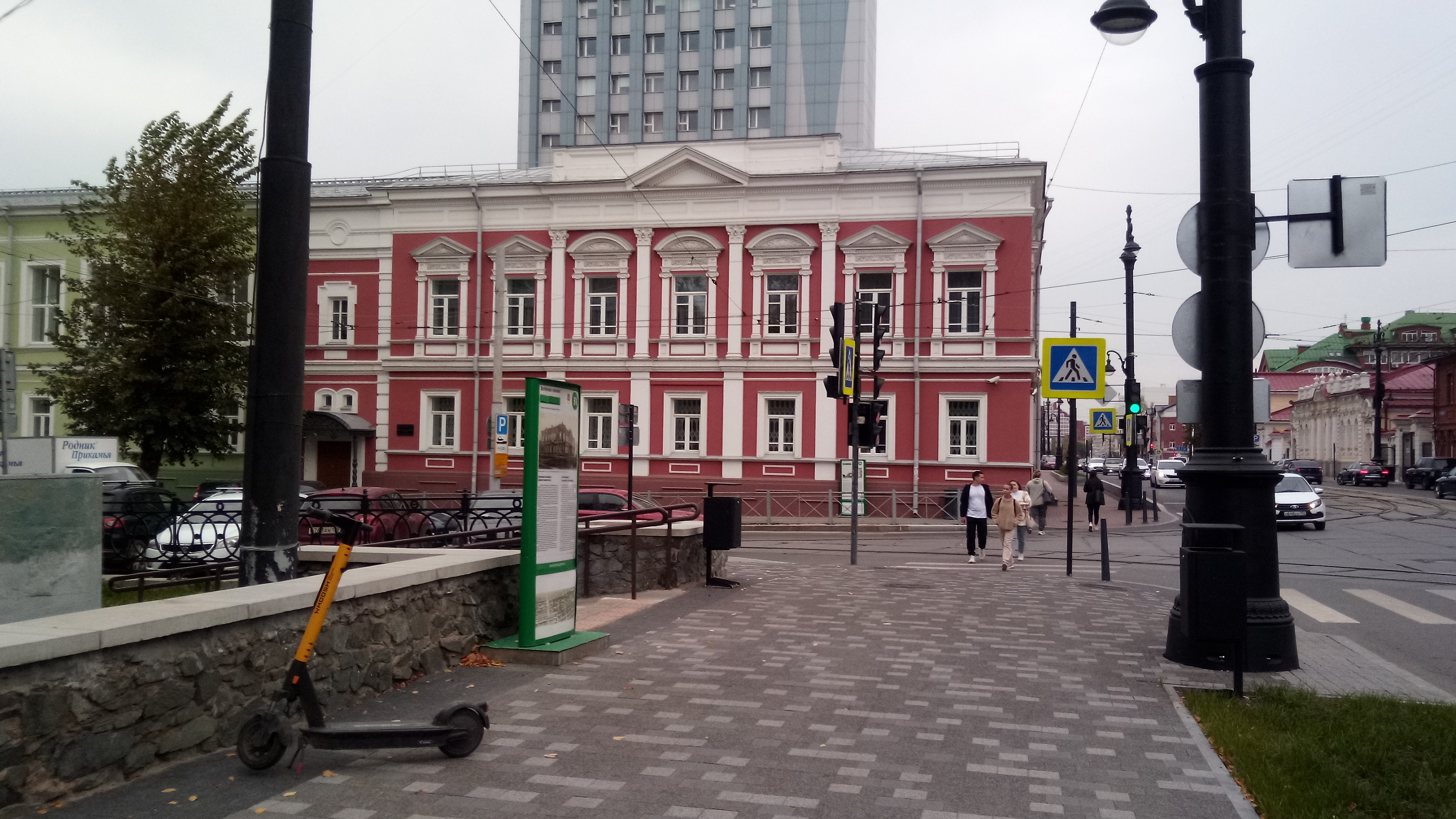
Former building in Perm, Russia

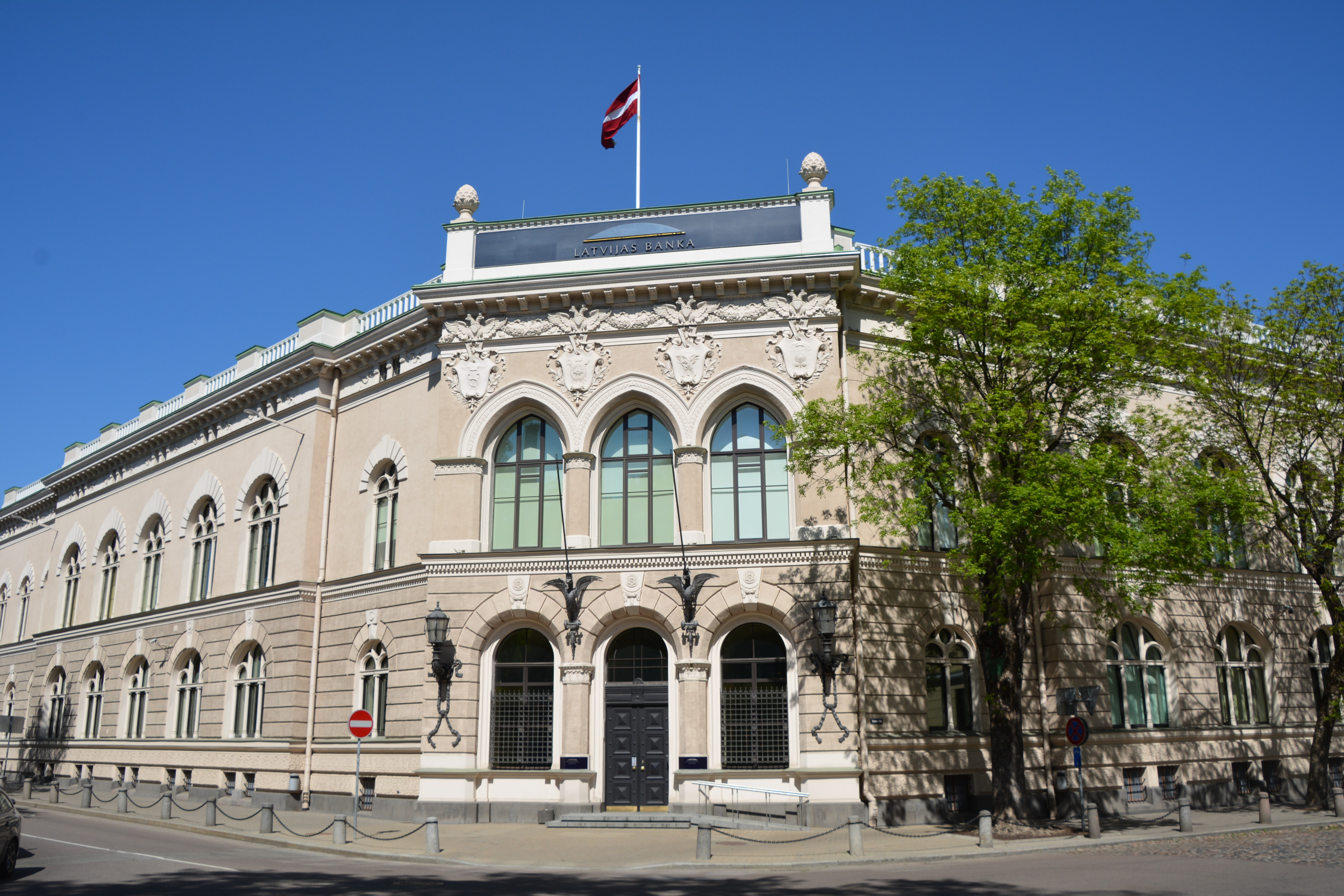
Former building in Riga, Latvia

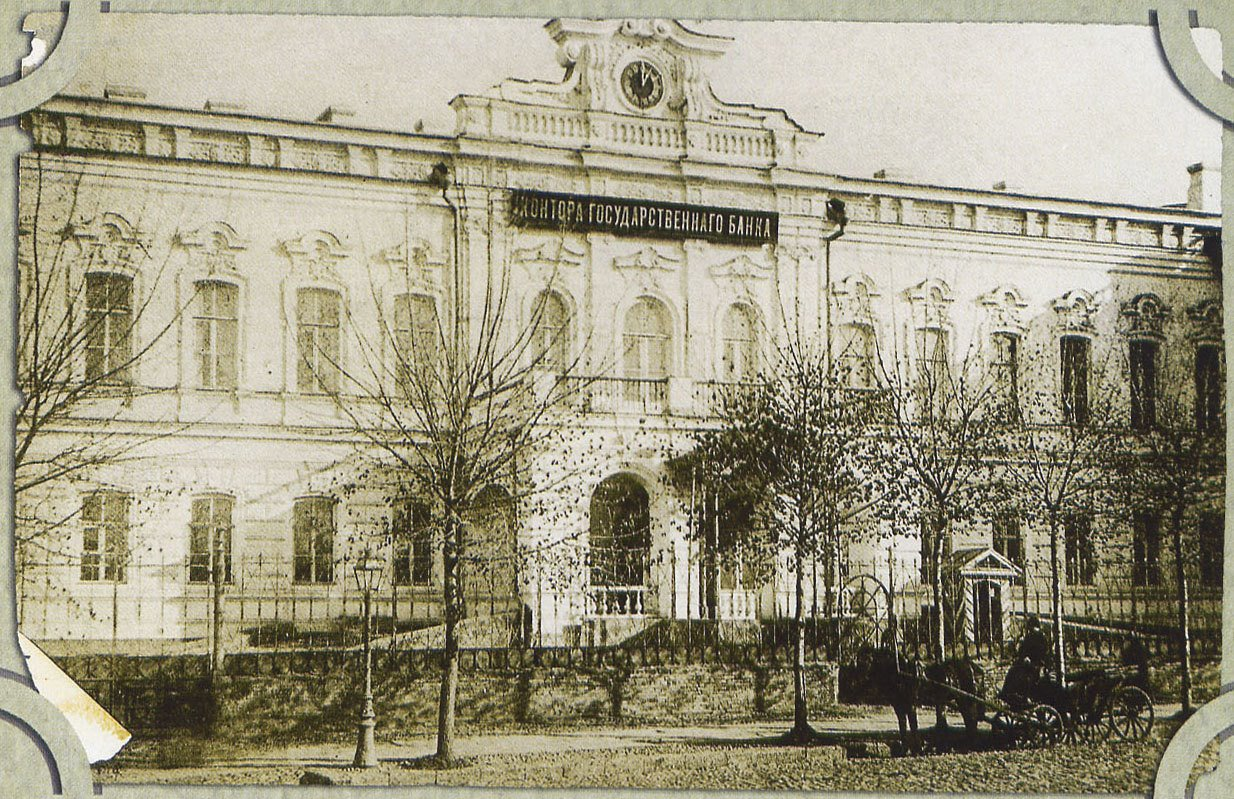
State Bank building in Rostov-on-Don, ca. 1910

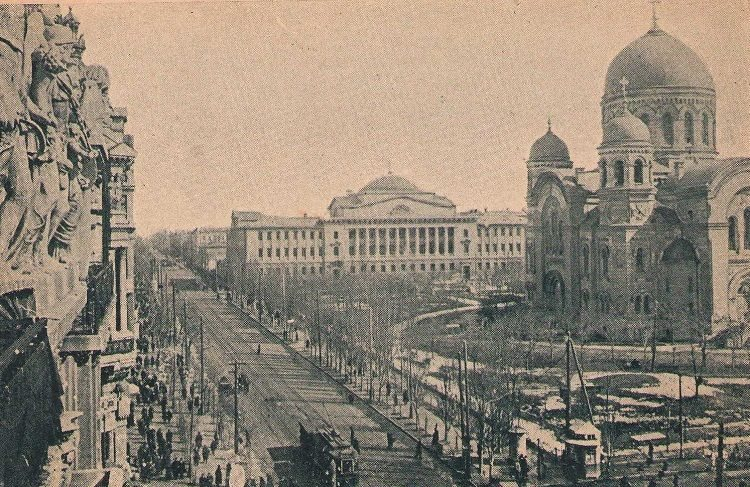
Rostov building following reconstruction in 1915

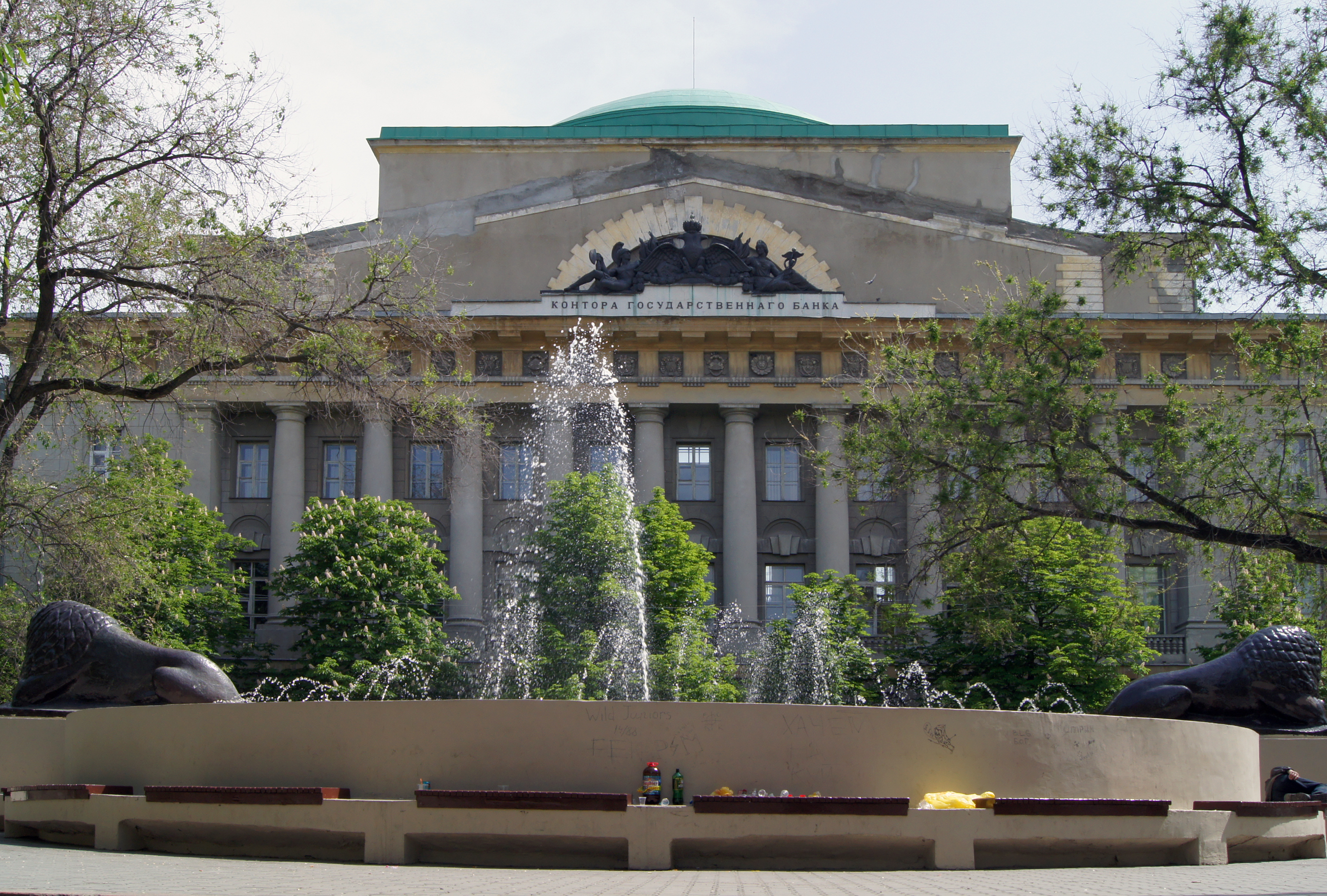
The same building in 2010

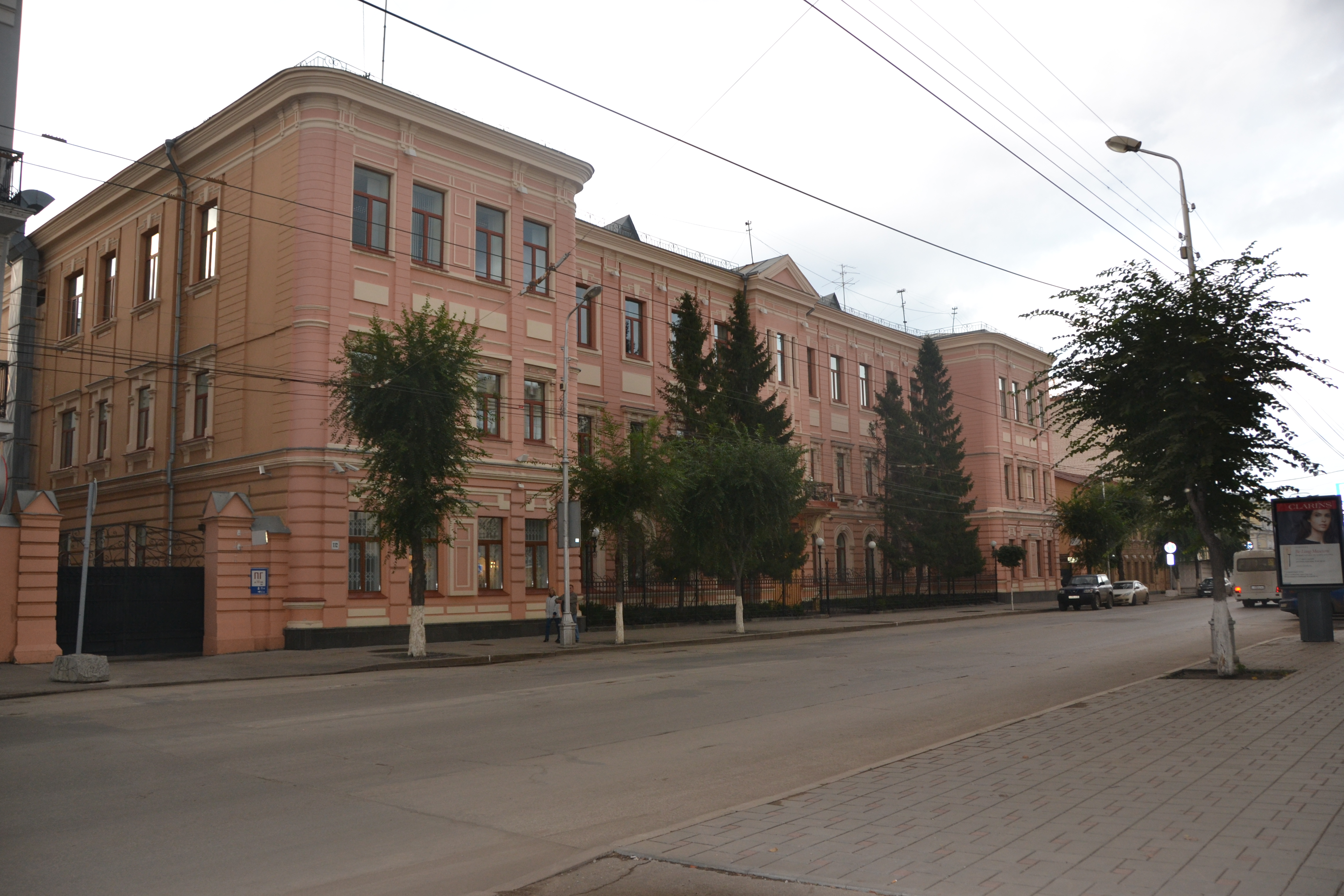
Former building in Samara, Russia

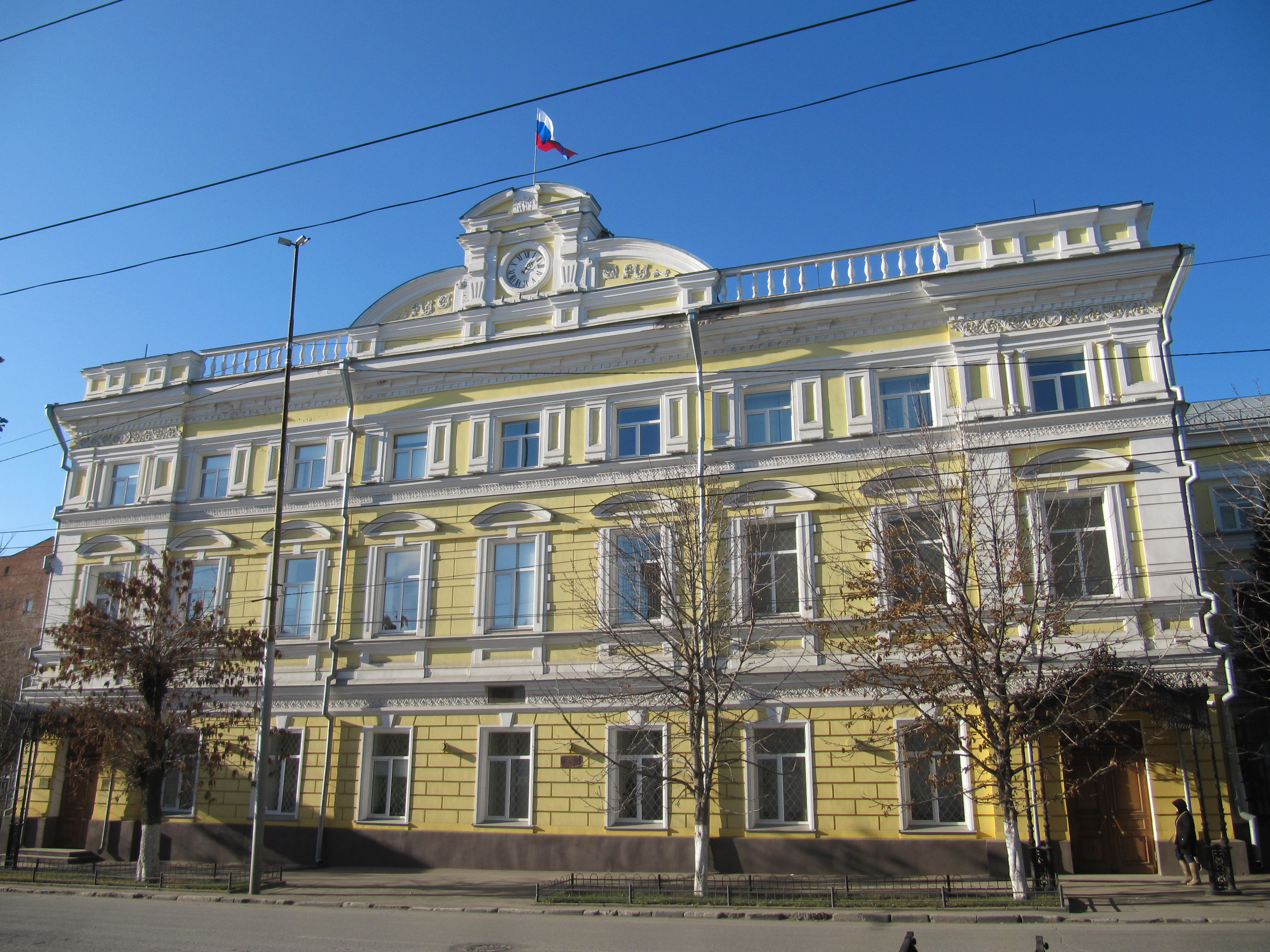
Former building in Saratov, Russia

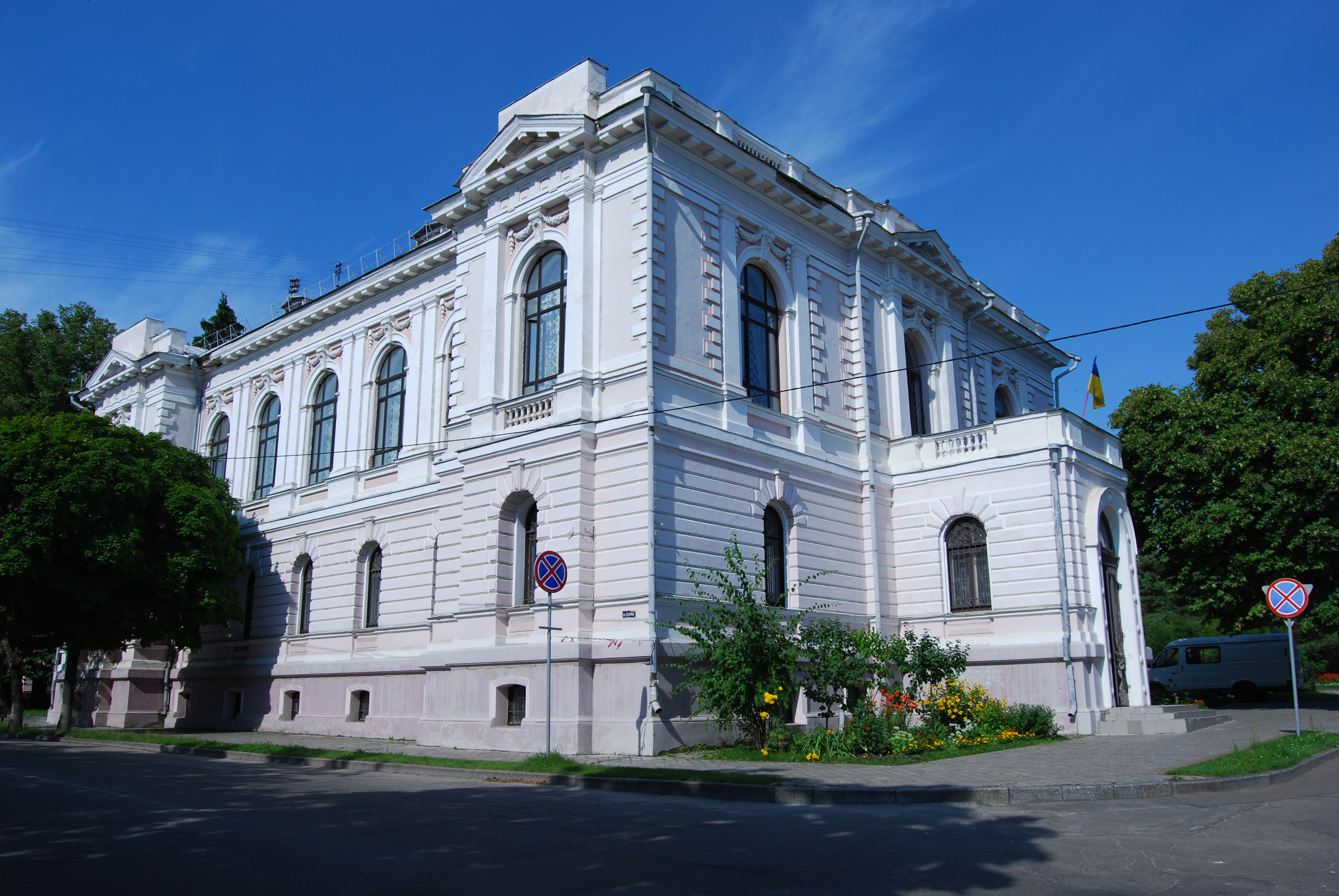
Former building in Sumy, Ukraine

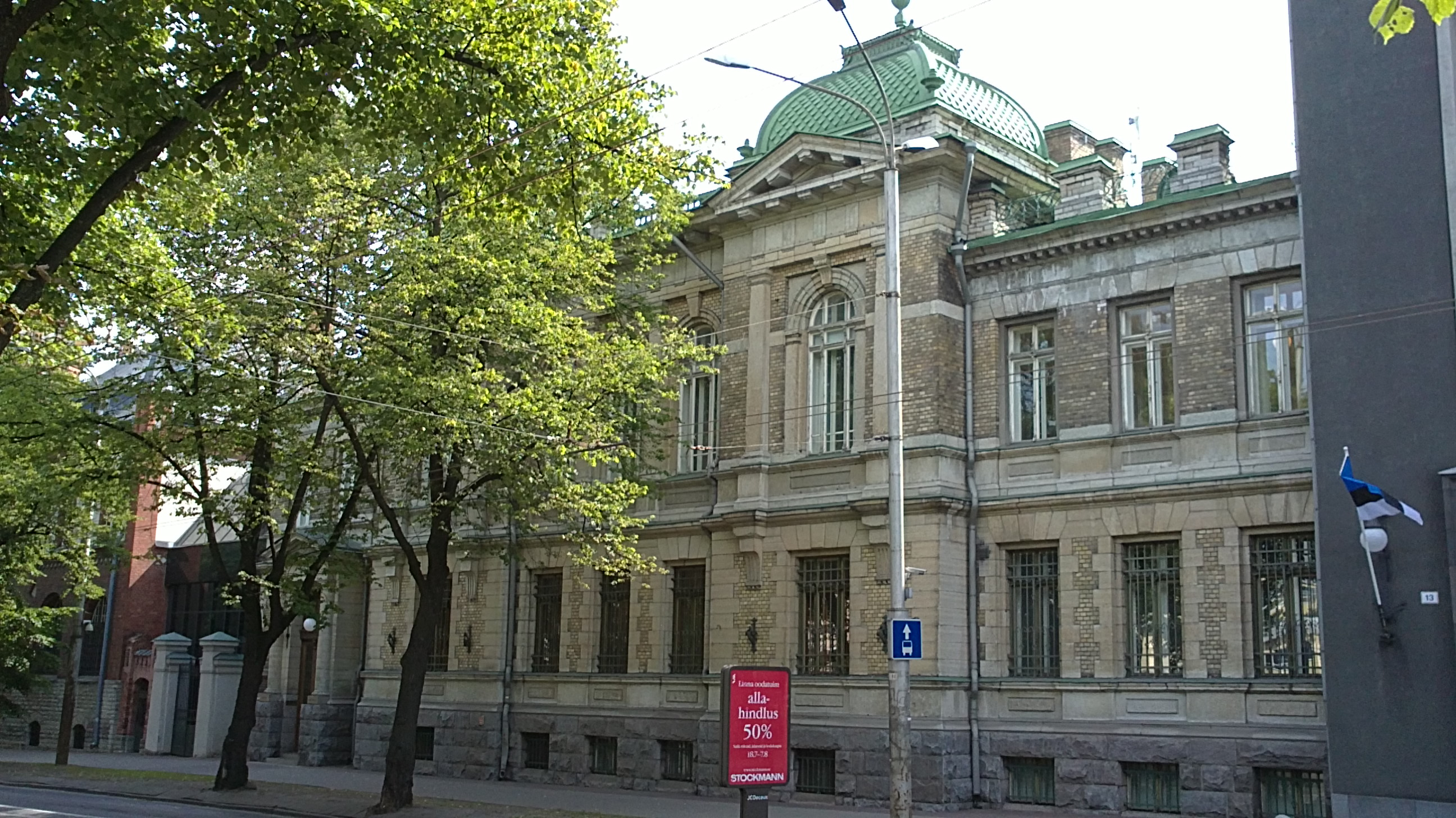
Former building in Tallinn, Estonia

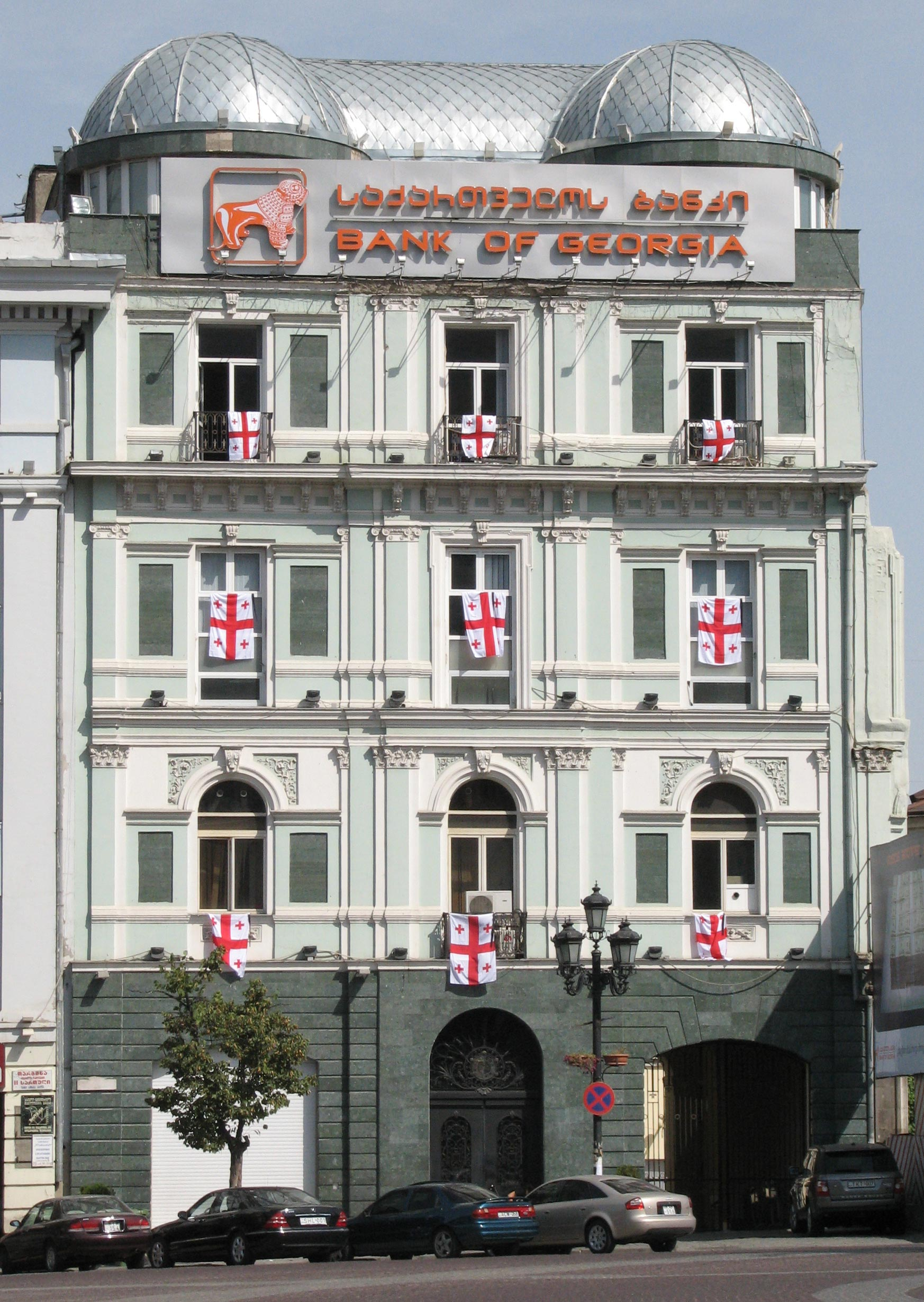
Former building in Tbilisi, Georgia

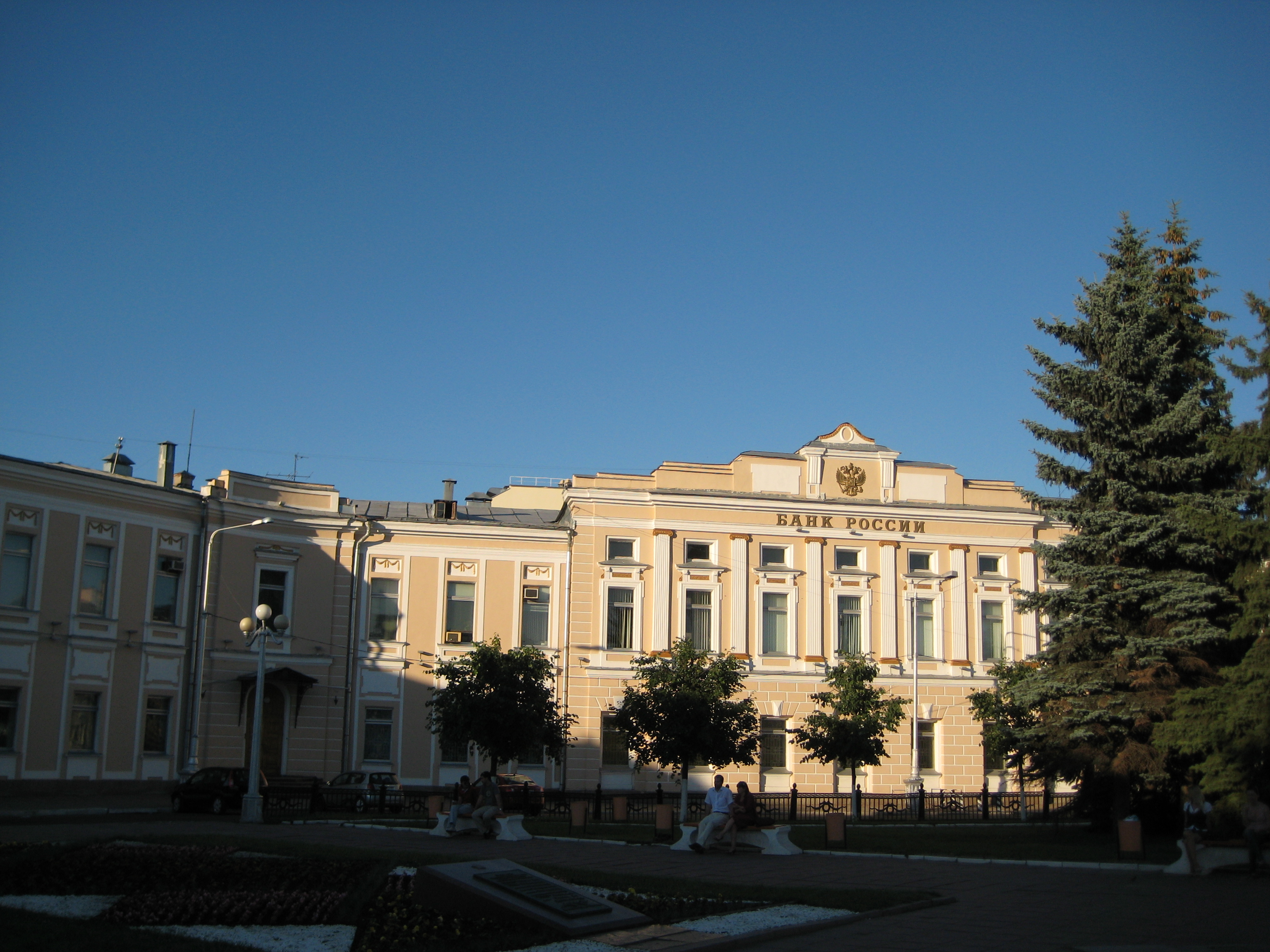
Former building in Tver, Russia

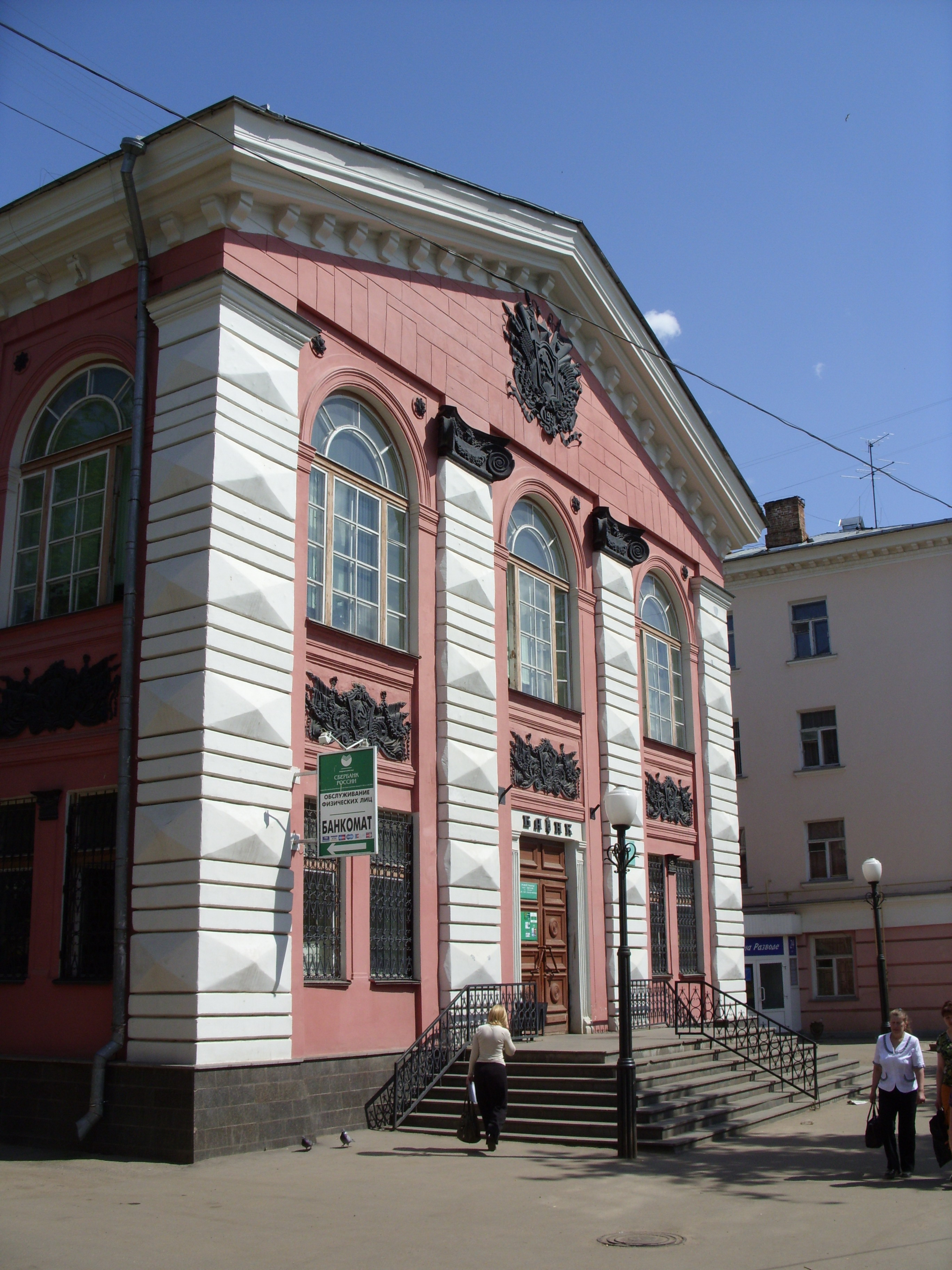
Former building in Velikiye Luki, Russia

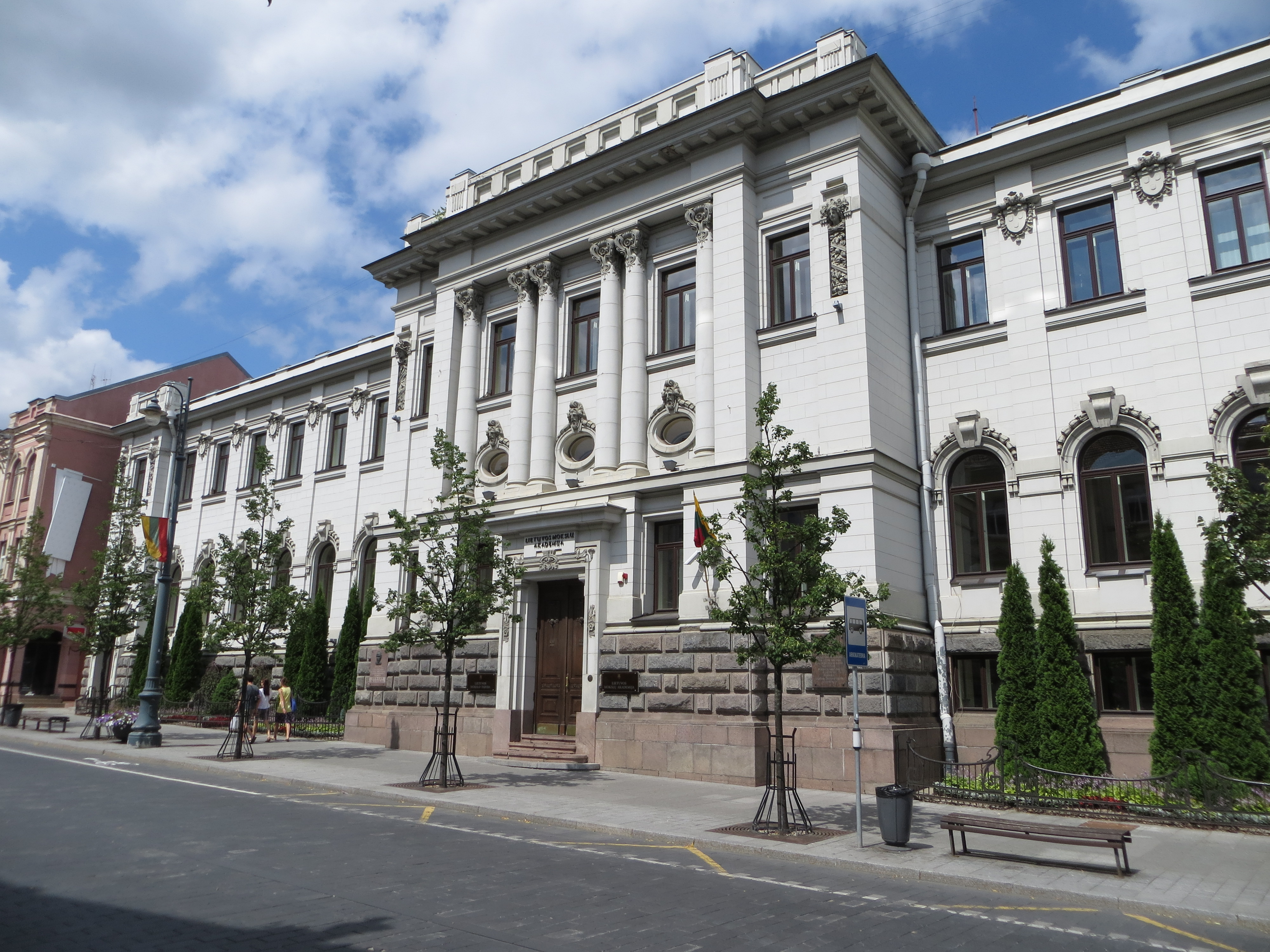
Former building in Vilnius, Lithuania

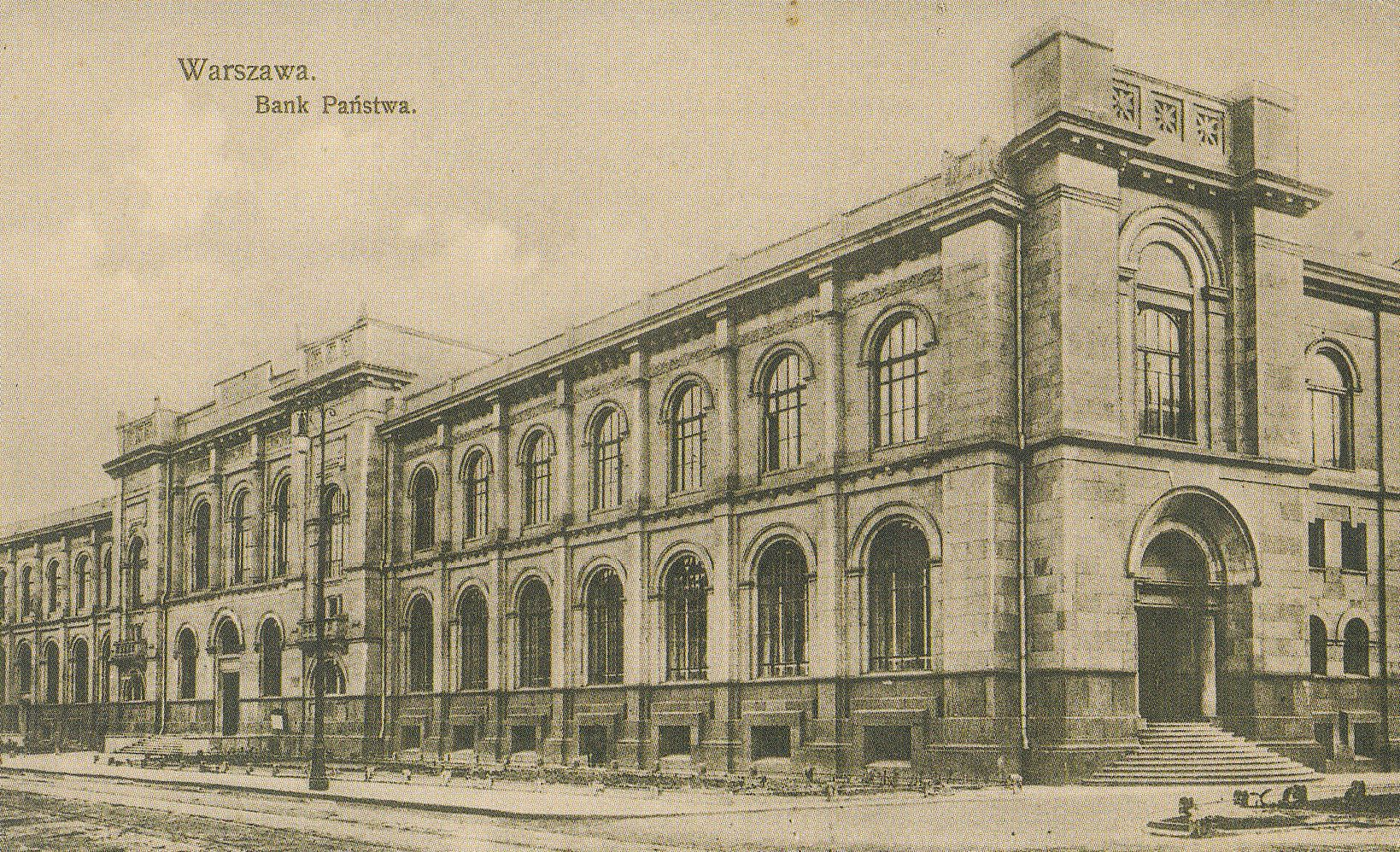
State Bank building in Warsaw, Poland

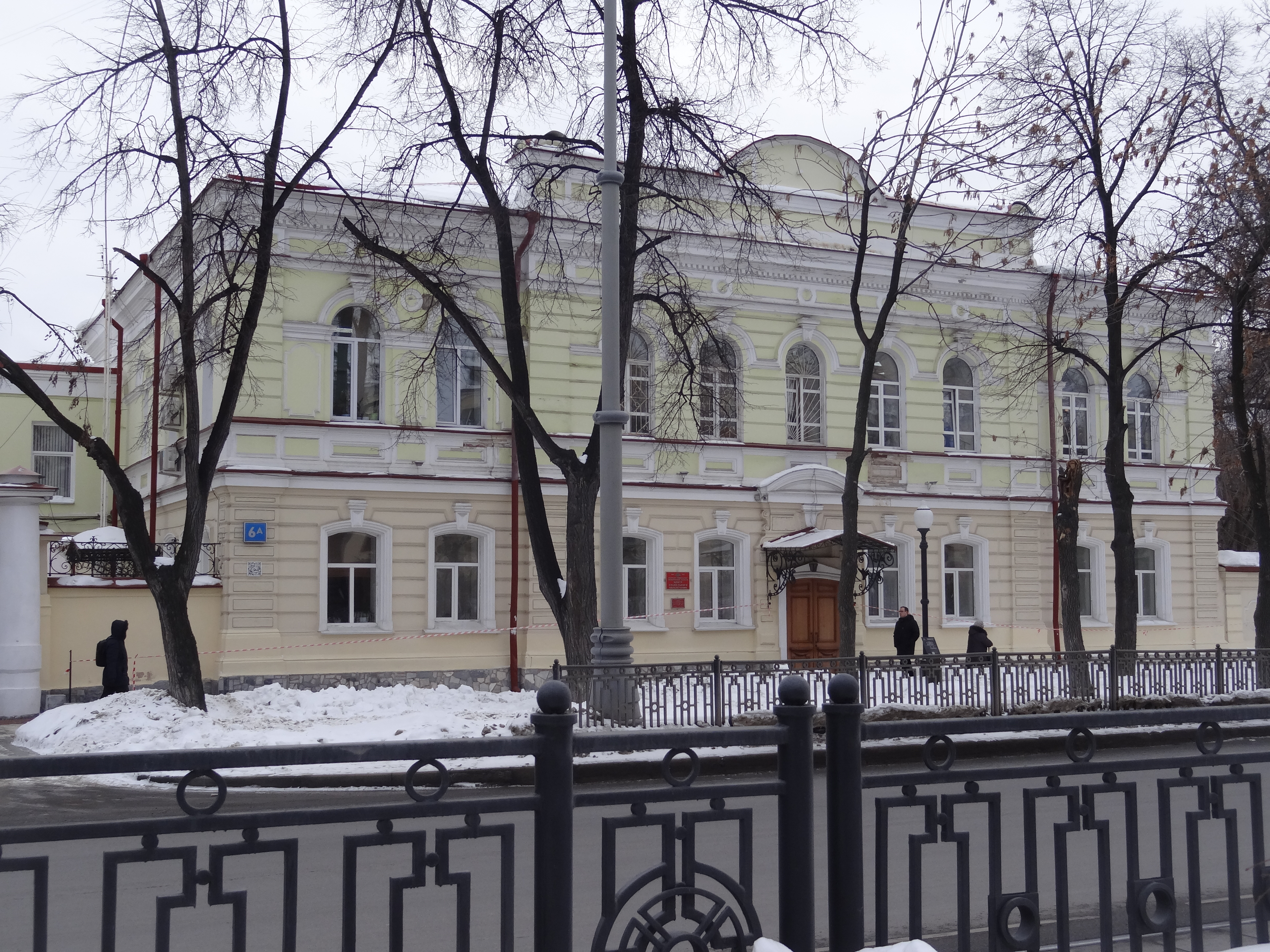
Former building in Yekaterinburg, Russia

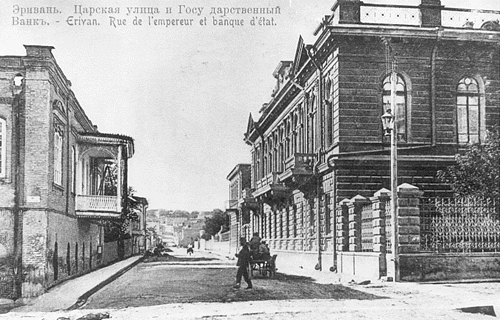
State Bank building in Yerevan, Armenia (right)

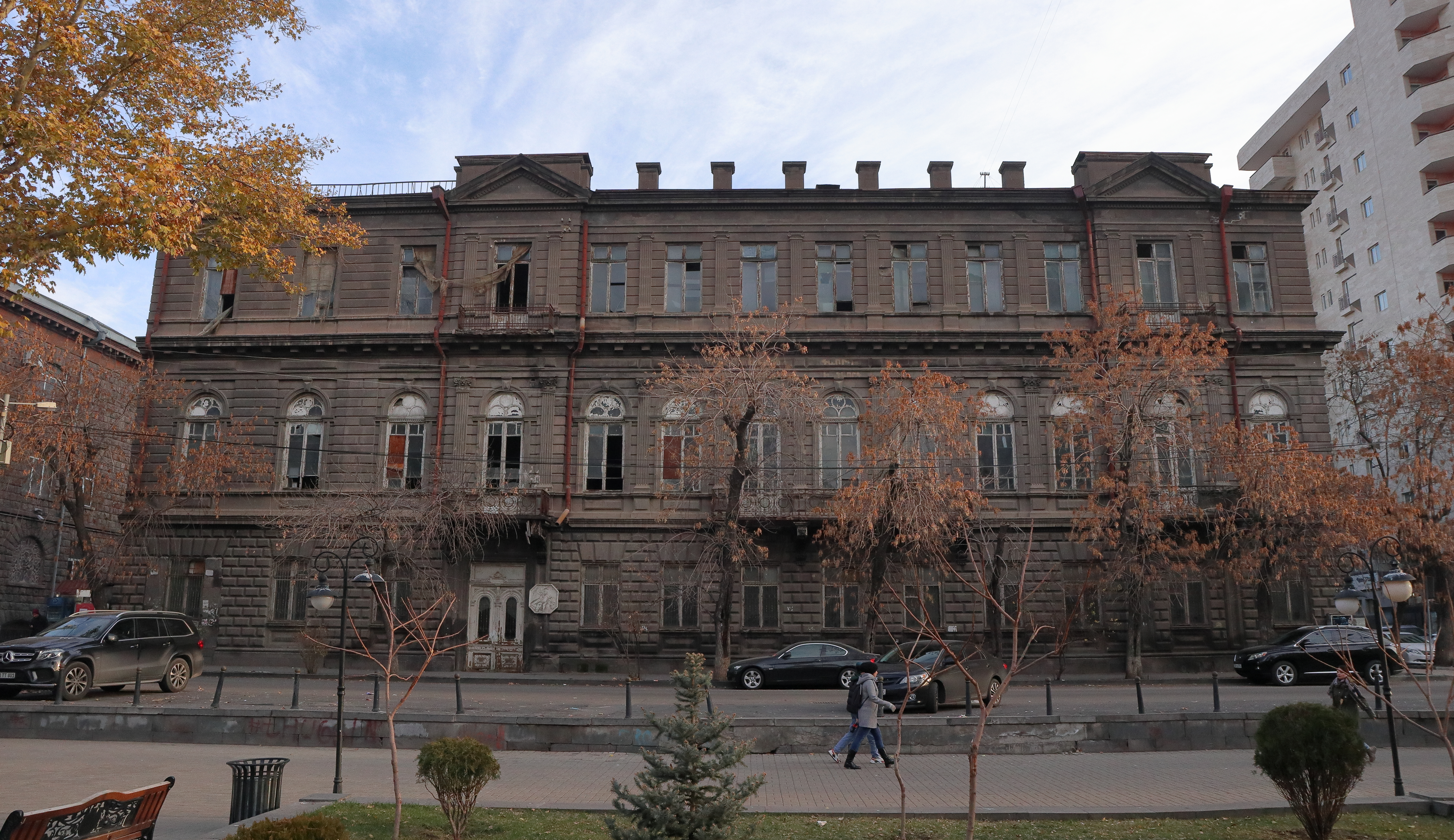
The same building in 2021

== Leadership ==
The governor was appointed by the emperor of Russia.

№	Name (governor)	Photo	Term of office		Appointed by
№	Name (governor)	Photo	Start of term	End of term	Appointed by
1	Alexander von Stieglitz		10 June 1860	1866	Alexander II
2	Evgeniy Lamanskiy		1866	1881	Alexander II
3	Alexey Tsimsen		1881	1889	Alexander III
4	Yuliy Zhukovskiy		1889	1894	Alexander III
5	Eduard Pleske		1894	1903	Nicholas II
6	Sergey Timashev		1903	1909	Nicholas II
7	Alexey Konshin		1909	1914	Nicholas II
8	Ivan Shipov		1914	1917	Nicholas II

== See also ==
- Austro-Hungarian Bank
- Ottoman Bank
