= Saint Petersburg State University of Economics and Finance =

Coordinates: 59.9313°N 30.3264°E

- Санкт-Петербургский государственный университет экономики и финансов
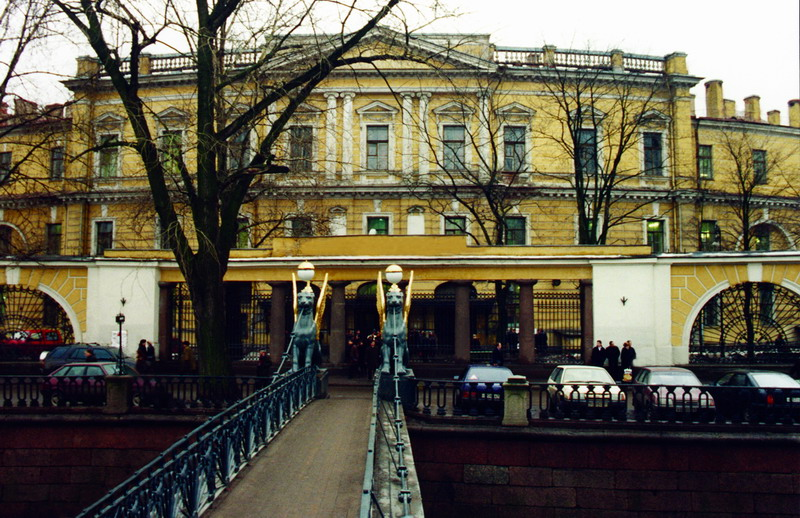
- Entrance to the university, with Bank Bridge in the foreground
- Type: Economics and Finance
- Established: 1930
- Location: Saint Petersburg, Russia
- Campus: Urban

Saint Petersburg State University of Economics and Finance (Russian: Санкт-Петербургский государственный университет экономики и финансов) was a public university in Saint Petersburg, Russia. It was established in 1930 as Leningrad Institute of Finance and Economics (Ленинградский финансово-экономический институт; hence the colloquial name Финэк (Finec)). In 2012, it united with Saint Petersburg State University of Service and Economics and Saint Petersburg State University of Engineering and Economics to create Saint Petersburg State University of Economics. The campus of the university occupied the buildings of the former Russian Assignation Bank.

== History ==
Leningrad Institute of Finance and Economics (LFEI) was created on the basis of the restructured economic faculty of Saint Petersburg Polytechnical Institute on 3 June 1930. LFEI was enlarged several times, by merging first with the Moscow Institute of Finance and Economics in 1934, then with Higher Institute of Finance and Economics (Leningrad) and Financial Academy (Leningrad) in 1940.

During World War II the institute was evacuated to Essentuki before being evacuated to Tashkent. Finec renewed its operations in Leningrad on 1 September 1944.

In 1954, LFEI was merged with Leningrad Planning Institute. In 1963, it was named after Russian economist and politician Nikolai Voznesensky. From 1966 to 1991, Yuri Lavrikov was a rector of the institute.

On 23 September 1991, by the decree of the Council of Ministers of RSFSR, N.A. Voznesenski Leningrad Institute of Economics and Finance was renamed Saint-Petersburg State University of Economics and Finance, its current name. During the post-Soviet years, the university established itself among the leaders of the Russian economic schools, being the first in the official ratings of the Russian Ministry of Education for more than a decade. In October 1991, Leonid Tarasevich has become the rector of the university. In December 2006, Igor Maksimtsev was elected as the new rector.

At present the university enrolls about 13,000 undergraduate and postgraduate students, who are given instruction at 11 faculties and 40 departments.

=== Campus ===
The campus, being urban, has its buildings scattered around the city. There are three dormitories (halls of residence) owned by the university in several areas. One is situated at Park Pobedy metro station, so it takes about 30–40 minutes to get to university from there. Another university dorm is located at Ladozhskaya metro station. Then there is a dormitory right in the university yard. However, it is being rebuilt now for the use as auditoria.

In 2015, they open a branch in Dubai, United Arab Emirates. Saint Petersburg State Economic University (Dubai branch) is located in Armada Tower at Jumeirah Lake Towers (JLT), Cluster P.

== Student life ==
=== Students’ Council ===
The Students’ Council of St Petersburg State University of Economics and Finance is the supreme body of the students’ self-government system, which is independent work of students inside scientific and pastime spheres.

=== April Students’ Scientific Research Conference ===
The university holds Students’ Scientific Research Conference every year discussing the problems of modern time.

Chronology

Year	Conference	Participants
1991	Students’ Scientific Research Conference on research findings of 1990	137
1992	Students’ Scientific Research Conference on research findings of 1991	200
1993	Students’ Scientific Research Conference on research findings of 1992 The 1992 Open Contest Award for the Best Student Research Paper in Natural Sciences, Technology and Humanities among higher institutions of the RF	307
1994	Students’ Scientific Research Conference on research findings of 1993 The 1993 Open Contest Award for the Best Student Research Paper in Natural Sciences, Technology and Humanities among higher institutions of the RF	410
1995	Economic Revival of Russia	600
1996	Russia's Integration into Global Economic Connections: current situation and problems	807
1997	Social and Economic Development of Russia's productive forces at the turn of the 21st century, devoted to the 70th anniversary of Yu. A. Lavrikov, an Honoured Scholar of the RF	934
1998	Russia and CIS: the experience of economic reforms	1190
1999	From crisis to the development of the economy and society as a whole	1300
2000	Social and Economic Development of Russia at the turn of the 21st century	1438
2001	Reforms in the Russian Economy in the third millennium: problems and prospects	1452
2002	Interrelation of Global and National Social and Economic Processes, devoted to the 300th Anniversary of St Petersburg	1123
2003	Social and Economic Transformations in Russia: Reforms, Results and Prospects, devoted to the 300th Anniversary of St Petersburg	1201
2004	Social and Economic Reforms and Transformations of Russian Society in the Globalising World	1369
2005	Economy Based on Knowledge is Russia's Future, devoted to the 75th Anniversary of St Petersburg State University of Economics and Finance	1900
2006	Russian Society and Economy: contemporary situation and prospects	1565
2007	Russian Economy Development: Innovative Future, devoted to the 80th anniversary of Yu. A. Lavrikov, an Honoured Scholar of the RF	1628
2008	Modernization of Russian Economy and Society within the Framework of National State and Social Reforms	1675
2009	Social and Economic Challenge of Russia and Problems of Solving Global Finance Crisis	2050
2010	Russian Economy Post-Crisis Development and Modernization (commemorating the 80th anniversary of St Petersburg State University of Economics and Finance)	over 2000

=== Scientific Research Paper Contest ===
Every year the Scientific Research Paper Contest is held at University.

=== Students’ Club ===
The Students’ Club of St Petersburg State University of Economics and Finance is more than 30 years old.

=== Brain Ring Club of St Petersburg University of Economics and Finance ===
The club comprising students and alumni aims at developing intellectual games movement at university.

=== Saint Petersburg Student Initiative Fund ===
The Saint Petersburg Student Initiative Fund was established in 1997 to promote youth policy in education, science and business and encourage initiative.

=== AIESEC office ===
AIESEC unites 23,000 students from 100 countries of the world and collaborates with 3,500 organizations.

== Notable people ==
=== Vladimir Alkhimov ===
Vladimir Alkhimov was the Head of the State Bank of the USSR.

=== Yury Boldyrev ===
Yury Boldyrev (born on 29 May 1960) is a Russian statesman and publicist. In 1983 he graduated from Leningrad Electrotechnical University (LETI) and then in 1989 from Leningrad Institute of Finance and Economics (LFEI). From 1989 to 1991 he was the People's Deputy of the USSR Supreme Sovyet. He was a member of the Superior Consultative Assembly under the chairman of the Supreme Soviet of Russia from 1991 to 1992.

=== Irina Eliseeva ===
Irina Eliseeva is an economist, PhD in economic science (1974), associate professor of economic science (1984), correspondent member of the Russian Academy of Sciences (1994), Honored Scholar of the RF (1999), Director of Sociological University of RAS.

She was a student and later became a professor in St Petersburg State University of Economics and Finance. Since 1990 Irina Eliseeva has been the Head of the Department of Statistics and Econometrics. In 2005 Irina Eliseeva initiated the Russian Research journal ‘Finance and Business’.

=== Svetlana Medvedeva ===
Svetlana Medvedeva was born in Kronstadt. She graduated from Leningrad University of Economics and Finance. Now she is the chair of the Board of Guardians ‘Spiritual and Moral Culture of Rising Generation of Russia’.

=== Alexey Miller ===
Alexey Miller is a businessman, Chairman of Gazprom Administration Board, Vice-chairman of Gazprom Board of directors, PhD in economics.

He graduated from Leningrad State Institute of Economics and Finance named after N. A. Voznesensky in 1984.

=== Andrey Illarionov ===
Andrey Illarionov is a former adviser of the President of Russia.

=== Alfred Koch ===
Alfred Koch is a Russian politician and former head of the Federal Agency for State Property Management.

=== Mikhail Manevich ===
Mikhail Manevich was born on 18 February 1961 and died on 18 August 1997 who was a vice-governor of St. Petersburg.

In 1983 he graduated from Voznesensky Leningrad Finance and Economics Institute. His master's thesis was about the management in social and economic systems. He was the chairman of the Urban Property Committee of St. Petersburg and a board member of the State Property Committee of the Russian Federation. In 1996 he became the vice-governor of St. Petersburg. He was one of authors of the current legislation on privatization and participated in the development of government programs of privatisation and housing and municipal reform. On August 18, 1997 he was seriously injured and died in hospital.

=== Tigran Sargsyan ===
Tigran Sargsyan was a Prime Minister of Armenia in 2008–2014.

From 1980 to 1983, he attended Leningrad Voznesensky Finance and Economics Institute. In 1987 his postgraduate education ended in obtaining a PhD degree.

From 1995 to 1998 he was the Chairman of the Armenian Bank Association. Sargsyan occupied the post of the Chairman of the Central Bank of Armenia (CBA) in 1998 and was re-elected by the Armenian National Assembly as the CBA Chairman for a second seven-year term on 2 March 2005. On 9 April 2008 he was appointed as the Prime Minister of Armenia by President Serzh Sargsyan upon the latter's inauguration.

=== Shamil' Valitov ===
Shamil' Valitov was the head of Kazan State Finance and Economics Institute. He graduated from Leningrad Finance and Economics Institute in 1976. Since 1984 after his postgraduate study in LFEI he has been working in Kazan Finance and Economics Institute from junior researcher to professor. In 2000 he became research vice-rector and since 2000 he has been the head of KSFEI. His research findings are being used by such companies as SNEMA, Khimprom, Nizhnekamskneftekhim and many others.

He was elected a member of the Academy of Labor and Employment in 1999, a member of the Academy of Humanities in 2001, a member of the Tatarstan Republic Academy of Informatization in 2003 and a member of the International Telecommunication Academy in 2005. Valitov was also a member of different government commissions. In 2000 he was awarded the honorary title of the Honoured Economist of the Tatarstan Republic and the Honoured Scientist of the Tatarstan Republic in 2005.

=== Oksana Dmitryeva ===
Oksana Dmitriyeva (born on 3 April 1958) is a Russian economist and politician. She graduated from the faculty of economic cybernetics of Voznesensky Leningrad Finance and Economics Institute in 1980. She is an expert on the regional economy. In 1998-1999 she became the professor of St. Petersburg State University of Economics and Finance. She obtained the degree of the Doctor of Sciences in Economics in 1992. She is the author of three monographies and more than sixty scientific works. Oksana Dmitryeva is the deputy of the State Duma of the Russian Federation.

=== Boris Pryankov ===
Boris Pryankov (born on 5 February 1940 — died on 31 December 2006), an alumnus of Voznesensky Leningrad Finance and Economics Institute, was the Doctor of Economics, the professor, the Honorary Worker of Higher Vocational Training of the Russian Federation. He worked at the Department of Enterprise Economy and Industrial Management for more than 35 years as a teacher and professor.

=== Inna Drouz ===
Inna Drouz (born on 24 June 1979) is a player of the Russian TV Show What? Where? When? and daughter of a famous player Aleksandr Druz. She graduated from St. Petersburg State University of Economics and Finance, Pierre Mendès-France University in Grenoble and Paris Dauphine University. She worked as a leading adviser of the corporate finance department at the Industrial Building Bank, then as an associate professor of the Finance Department in St. Petersburg State University of Economy and Finance.

=== Dmitry Makarov ===
Dmitri Makarov is a Russian footballer. He started his career in FC Zenit-2 Saint Petersburg in West Zone second division. Between 2002 and 2004 he played as a forward in the main team. Since 2008 he has headed the teenager team Zenit.

=== Timur Batrutdinov ===
Timur Batrutdinov is a Russian comedian and television anchorman, a resident of the ‘Comedy club’. He graduated from St Petersburg State University of Economics and Finance in 2000. Timur Batrutdinov was born on February 11, 1978, in the Tatar family in the village of Voronovo near Moscow. Despite his love to literature and KVN, Timur Batrutdinov became a student of the Department of Human Resources Management at St Petersburg State University of Economics and Finance. As a student, he played KVN and wrote scenarios for the city team. Now besides Comedy Club he is the host of some TV programs and projects. His filmography: serials Sasha+Masha (2004) and The Club (2005–2007).

=== Alexander Khanin ===
Alexander Khanin is an Israeli theater and reportage photographer. He is the winner of a number of Israeli and international photography competitions.
