= Alexander Khanin =

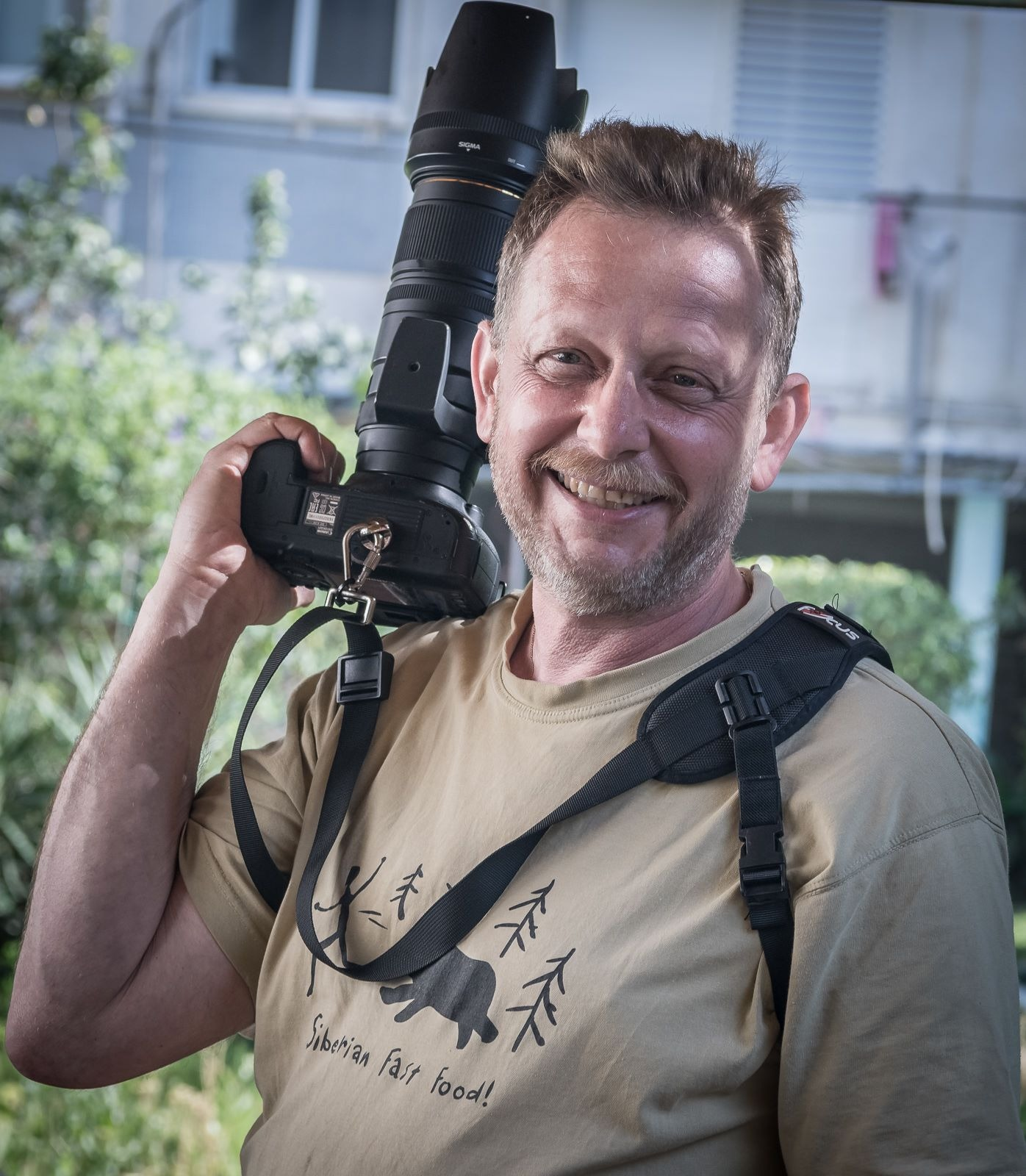
- Born: June 29, 1968 (age 58); Leningrad, RSFSR, USSR
- Other name: Deda Sasha
- Occupations: photographer, photojournalist
- Style: theater, reportage, and concert photography

Alexander Mikhailovich Khanin (born June 29, 1968) is an Israeli photographer and photojournalist, also known by the pseudonym “Deda Sasha”. He studied at the Leningrad Institute of Finance and Economics, from which he was conscripted into mandatory service in the Soviet Army. In 1991, on the eve of the August coup attempt, he moved to Israel.

He began pursuing photography professionally in the early 2010s. After a serious accident in 2018, photography became his primary occupation. He specializes in theater, concert, and reportage photography. He collaborates with educational and musical projects and runs a thematic Telegram channel featuring cultural announcements. Several solo exhibitions of Khanin's work have been organized in Israel.

== Early life and education ==
Alexander Khanin was born in Leningrad, in the Vyborgsky District. His mother was Khanina (née Fridman). His father, Mikhail Isaakovich Khanin, was the chief engineer of the Leningrad Machine-Building Plant, taught rhetoric, and was a writer; he later emigrated to Sweden and resides in Stockholm.

From 1985 to 1991, Khanin studied at the N. A. Voznesensky Leningrad Institute of Finance and Economics. During his studies, he was conscripted into the Soviet Army as part of a student draft. He was assigned to the Vystrel Course, where he served as a firearms instructor. He later wrote an electronic memoir titled “Company, Reveille!”; the text was used in the development of the screenplay for the comedy television series Soldiers.

=== Israel ===
In 1991, one day before the August coup attempt, Khanin left the USSR with his first wife and their one-and-a-half-year-old daughter, relocating permanently to Israel. He initially lived on a kibbutz, later in the Gush Dan area, and subsequently spent 20 years in one of the Israeli settlements. He is the father of four children. He worked in the field of information technology, including software testing.

In 2018, Khanin was involved in a serious motorcycle accident. He was hospitalized in intensive care with severe injuries. He underwent a prolonged course of rehabilitation, relearning independent mobility and daily living skills. As a result of the accident, he sustained a disability, including limited facial muscle mobility and double vision (diplopia).

== Career ==
Khanin is a member of the Israel Journalists Association, a journalist accredited by the Government Press Office of Israel, and a member of the Israeli Artists Association.

He began taking photographs at the age of 12 using a Smena-2 camera—the same model year as his birth—which he borrowed from his father. He earned money for his first personal camera during a vocational internship after the 9th grade. He pursued photography intermittently for many years and turned to it seriously in early 2013, when he began working on large-scale theater and concert projects. After a severe motorcycle accident in 2018, photography became a form of occupational therapy for Khanin, as well as his primary occupation and a way of adapting to major changes in his life.

Theater photography is one of the principal areas of Khanin's work and brought him recognition in Israel. He has documented hundreds of productions by leading Israeli theaters. He has photographed performances at the Israeli Opera, as well as at the theaters Gesher, Habima, Cameri, Malenki Theater, Yiddishpiel, and many others.

His work has been published in Teatral magazine.

Khanin describes his creative method as follows:

“When looking at the stage through the lens, I try to capture not the external, but the internal state of the performer — what he wants to convey to the audience, his emotion, his strength, his weakness, his tears, his life on stage.”

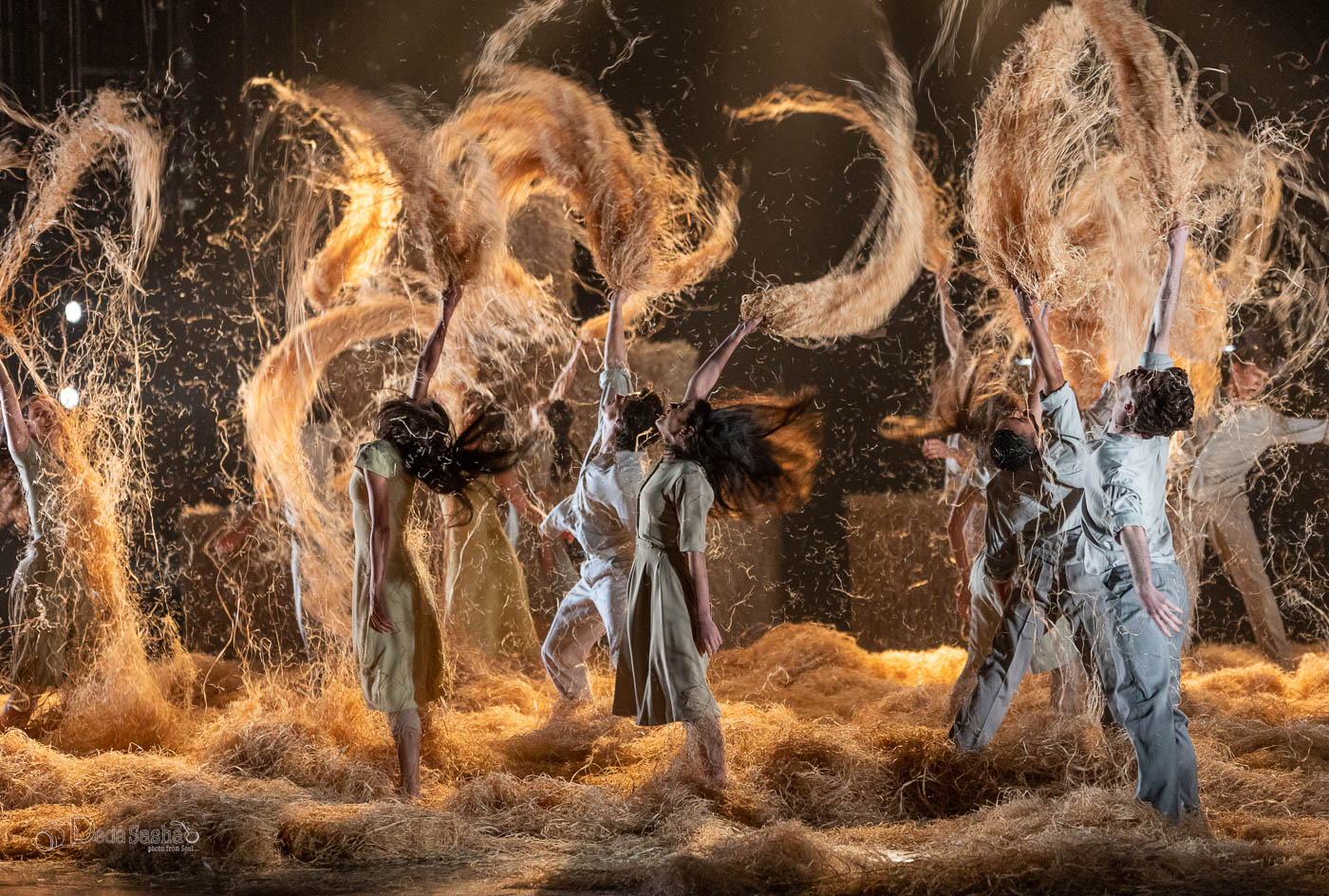
Ballet A Midsummer Night's Dream (Israeli Opera).

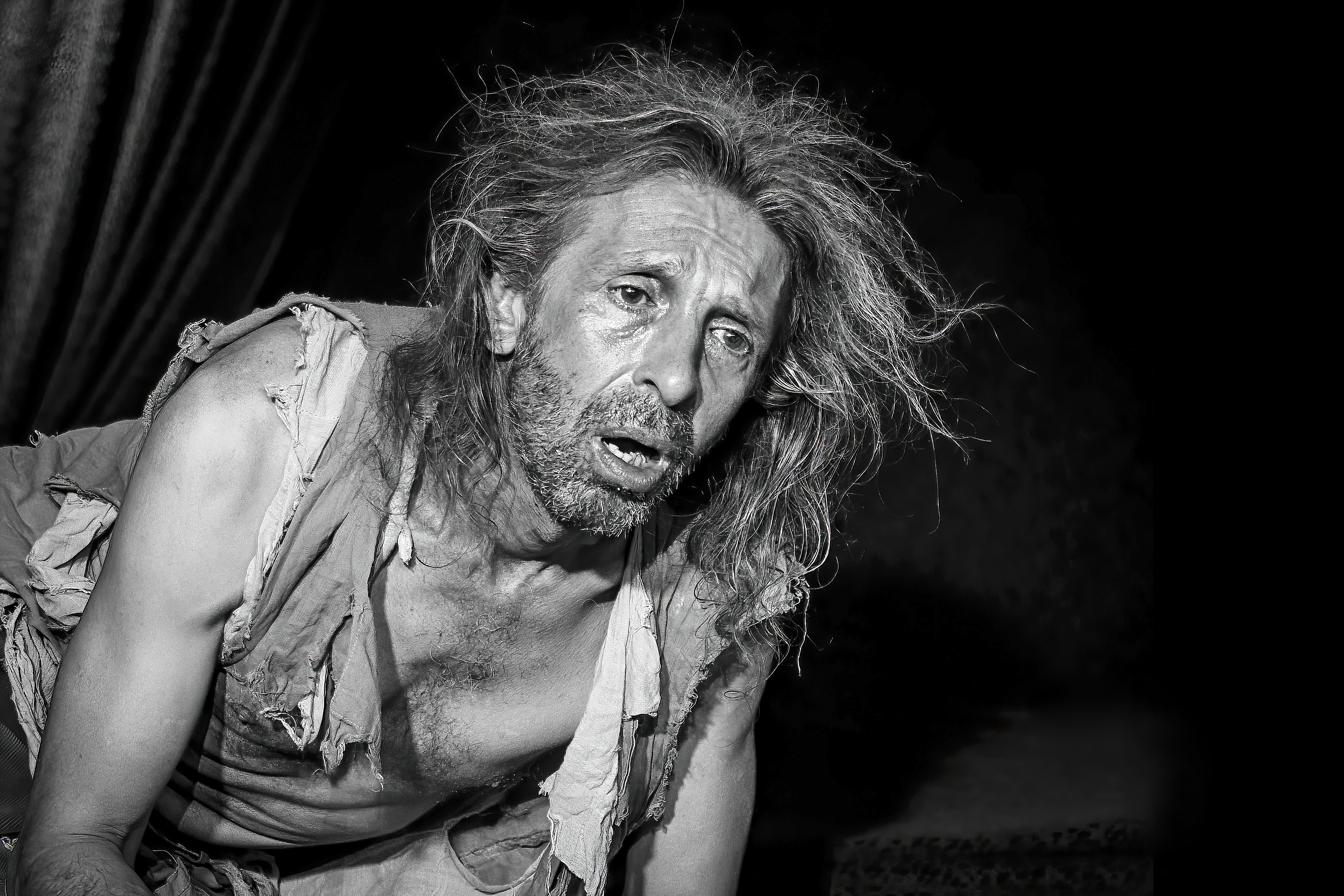
Oleg Rodovilsky in the play The Old Man and the Sea (ZERO Theater).

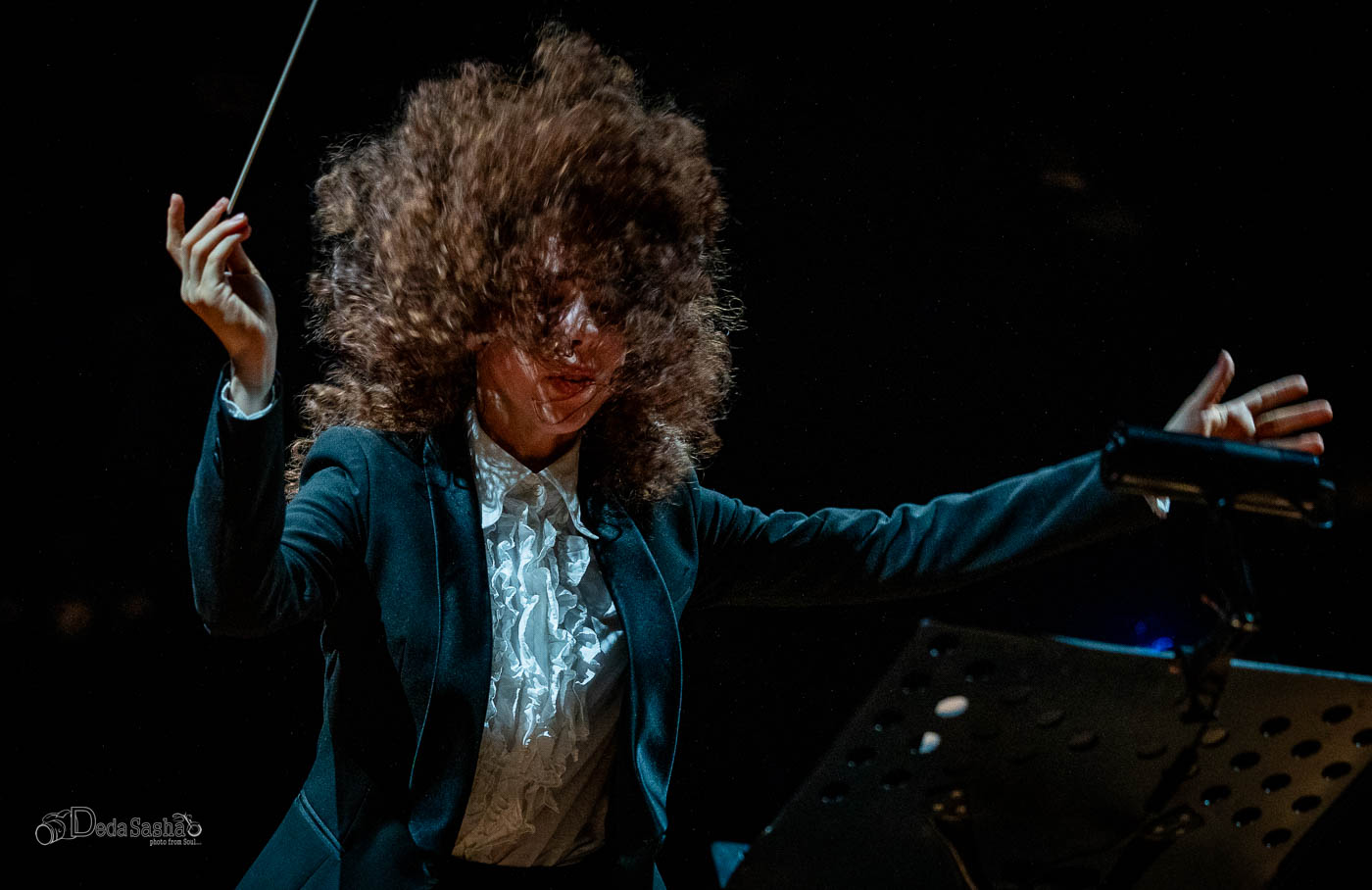
Elizabeth Damsker (Suzanne Dellal Centre for Dance and Theatre).

As a photojournalist, he has covered international exhibitions, festivals, and conferences, as well as photographed political figures and public events.

Following the outbreak of the war with Hamas in 2023, he documented the aftermath of the massacre at the Supernova Sukkot Gathering music festival, as well as in the kibbutzim of Re’im, Nir Oz, Kfar Aza, Be’eri, and Avshalom. He also photographed the consequences of rocket fire in Kiryat Shmona and the situation along Israel's northern border, which was subjected to attacks by Hezbollah.

A number of Khanin's solo exhibitions are dedicated to the theme of the war in the Middle East.

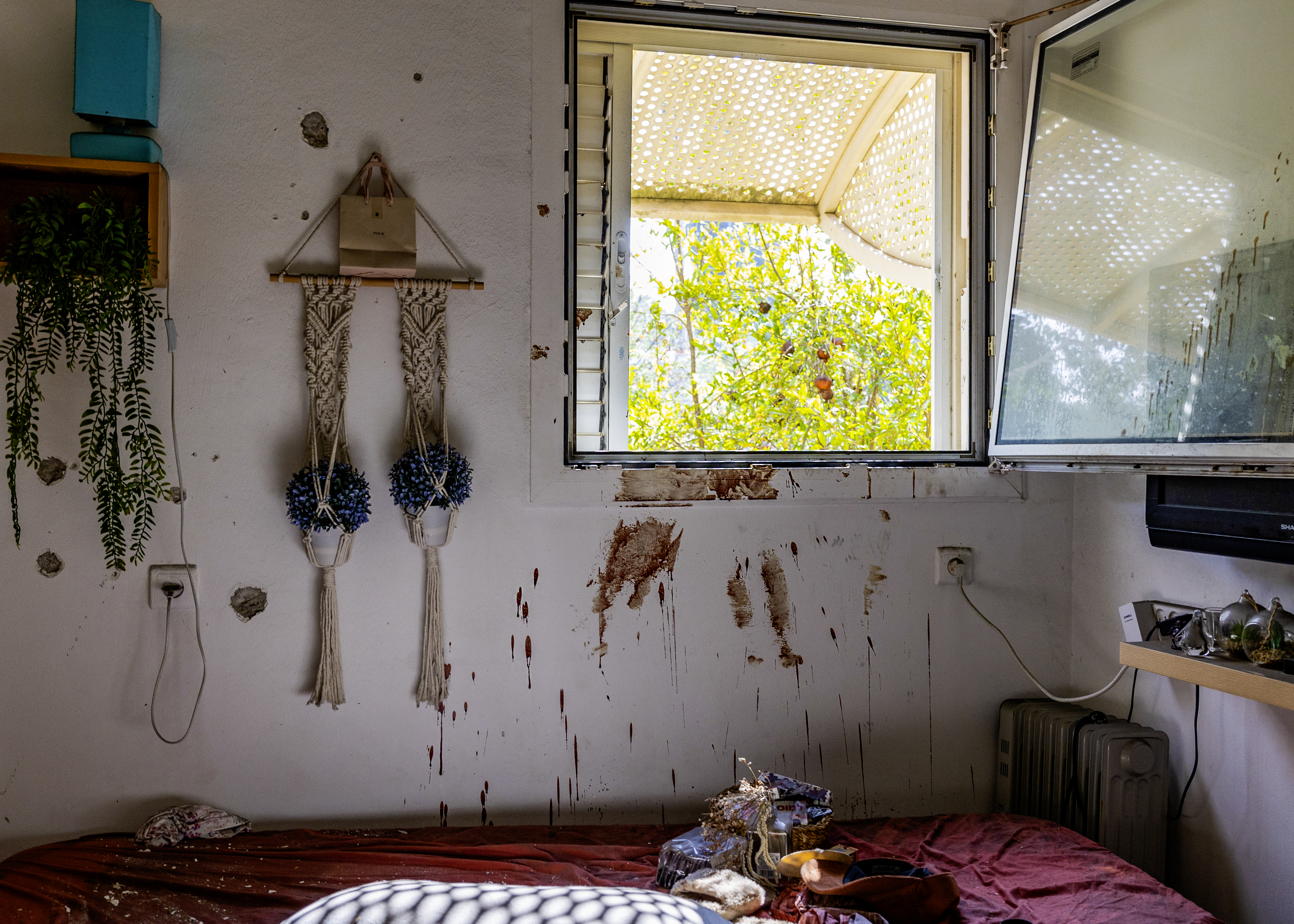
A child's room after the Hamas attack on October 7, 2023 (Kfar Aza).

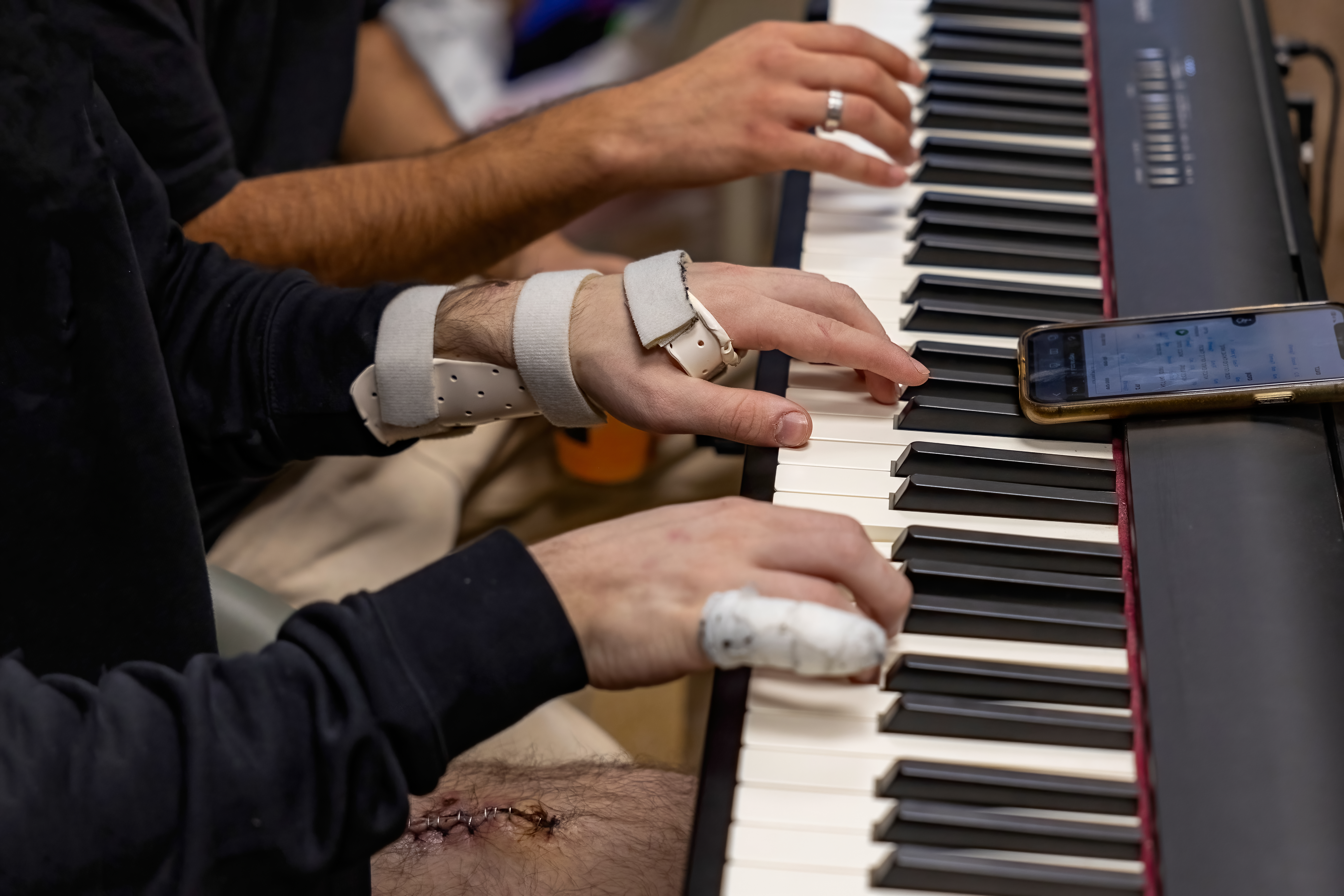
Rehabilitation of a wounded Israeli soldier.

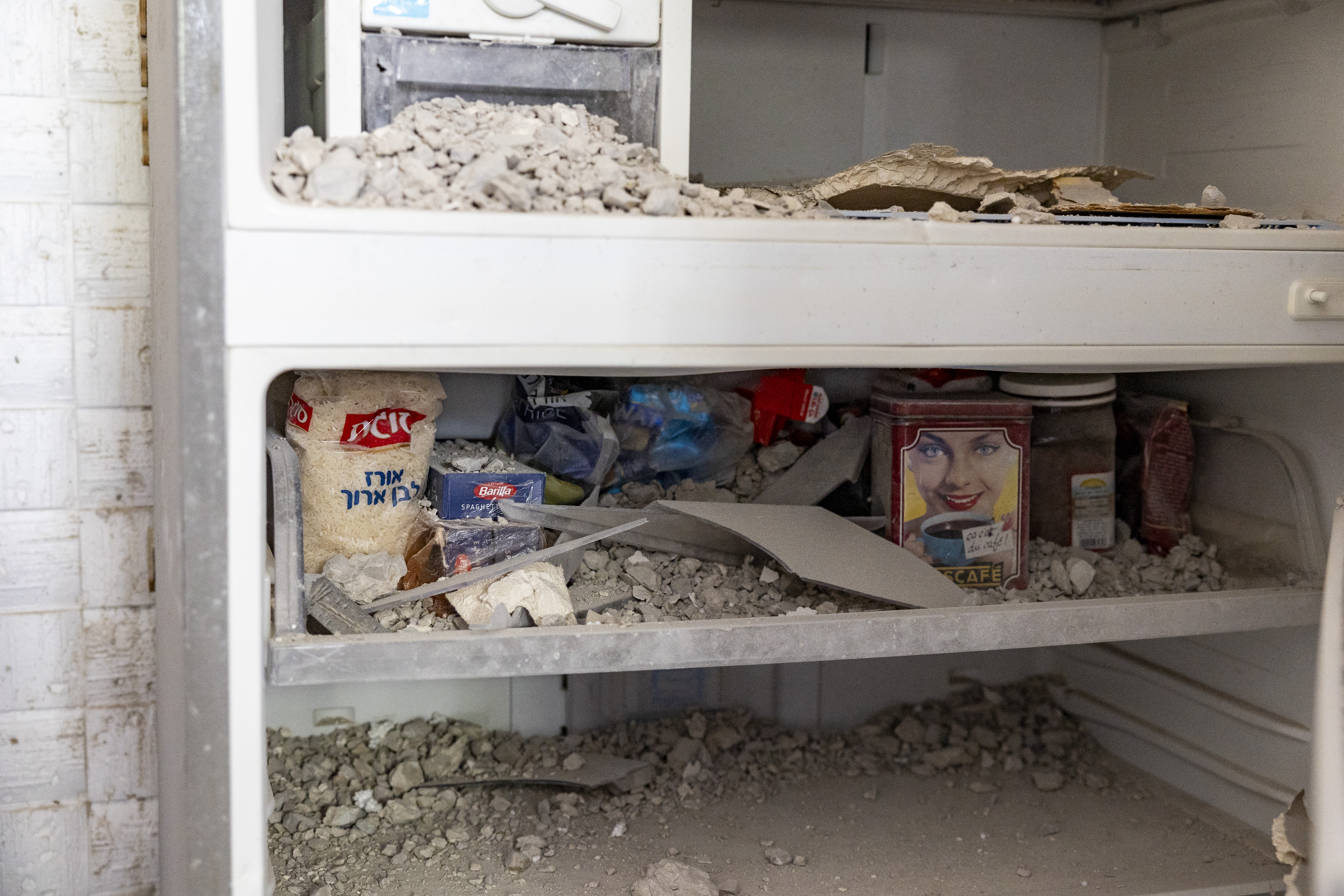
After rocket fire from Hezbollah (Kiryat Shmona).

== Public and cultural activities ==
Since 2022, he has run the Telegram channel “Announce-Poster Israel by Deda Sasha,” dedicated to announcements of cultural events in Israel.

Since 2018, he has been an active participant in international conferences of the educational program Limmud. He has taken part as a photographer, lecturer, and workshop leader (including the workshop “Does Photography Violate the Second Commandment ‘Thou Shalt Not Make for Thyself a Graven Image,’ or How to Photograph Celebrities”). Photographs from Khanin's exhibition “War. A View from Within” have been used by program lecturers.

Photographs taken by Khanin documenting the aftermath of the Hamas invasion of Israel (2023) were used in the music video “In Memory of the Innocent Victims” (2025) by Israeli singer Irina Kilfin. His wartime photographs were also featured in the music video by the Israeli female a cappella group The Pitches for the song “I Have No Other Country”.

== Solo exhibitions ==
A number of Khanin's solo exhibitions have been held in Israel, including:

- “Graduation” — in collaboration with artist and art educator Roni Reuven (2023, Givatayim Art Gallery).
- “Life on Stage” (2023, Petah Tikva Cultural Center).
- “Lenya Ptashka and His Friends” — an exhibition combined with a concert by Israeli jazz musician Leonid Ptashka (2024).
- “War. A View from Within” (2025, Petah Tikva; 2026, Haifa).
- “Remember What Amalek Did to You” — dedicated to the second anniversary of the Hamas invasion (2025, Skizza Gallery, Jerusalem).
- “Short Memory. Long Memory” — also devoted to the war and organized by art historian Ilya Rodov, Professor of Art History and Head of the Department of Jewish Art at Bar-Ilan University.

== Awards and recognition ==
Khanin was named Photographer of the Year in 2017 by Glamur magazine as part of its “Person of the Year” awards, and was also a prizewinner in the 2022 All-Israel Photography Competition.

In 2023, at the international photography competition “Theatre Through the Lens,” he won first place in the category “Movement in Art” for his photograph of the ballet A Midsummer Night's Dream, staged by the Theater Dortmund and performed at the Israeli Opera.

In 2025, he again won first place at the “Theatre Through the Lens” competition in three categories:

- Portrait — for a photograph from Marina Shaif's autobiographical performance (Fulcro Theater);
- Open Category — for a photograph of Fyodor Makarov in the play “Baba Frida” (Davay Theater);
- Movement in Art — for a photograph of Elizabeth Damsker in the play That's All You Need to Know About Conducting (A39 Theatre Studio).
