= ENGECON Dubai =

Coordinates: 59°00′00″N 30°00′00″E

Saint Petersburg State University of Engineering and Economics, Dubai Branch
- Motto: Economic education for the welfare of Motherland
- Type: State
- Established: 2005
- Location: Dubai, UAE
- Campus: Urban
- Colors: Blue and White

The Dubai Branch of former Saint-Petersburg State University of Engineering and Economics, now a part of the Saint-Petersburg State University of Economics.

The Saint-Petersburg State University of Economics has an International branch outside the Russian Federation in Dubai. It is named Saint-Petersburg State Economic University (Dubai branch). The Dubai Branch was founded in 2005.

== See also ==
- List of institutions of higher learning in Russia
