= Marcela Del Río Reyes =

Mexican intellectual, journalist and writer (1932–2022)

Marcela Yolanda Del Río y Reyes (30 May 1932 – 1 April 2022) was a Mexican intellectual, academic, journalist, diplomat and writer. Her works covered national and global issues.

== Early life ==
Del Río Reyes was born in Coyoacán, Mexico City and grew up in a family of writers. Her mother, María Aurelia Reyes de del Río, was a writer, journalist and painter. Her father, Manuel del Río Govea, was a lawyer, historian and was a former child actor. Her brother, Carlos Pacheco Reyes, was a philosopher, journalist and psychiatrist. She learned to paint and inherited her liking for literature and classical music from her mother. Her interest for theater and history came from her father.

Her mother died suddenly when she was only 17 years old. It forced her to quit her studies and get a job as a secretary in a government office. Alfonso Reyes, her great-uncle, revised her first newspaper articles that she had started to write (when she was 16-years-old, she won a poetry award) after retaining her mother's column of opera reviews. Del Río Reyes also worked as a personal assistant to Diego Rivera during the last four years of his life. She was married to the world-renowned Mexican violinist, Hermilo Novelo, for 23 years until his death in an automobile accident in 1983 at the age of 52.

== Education ==
Del Rio Reyes attended high school at the Universidad Femenina de México. In college, she attended the Universidad Nacional Autónoma de México and Escuela de Arte Teatral de Bellas Artes. After graduating, director Seki Sano, gave her a scholarship to study in his Academia, where she shared a classroom with actors from previous generations such as Wolf Ruvinskis and María Douglas. She received her Doctor in Philosophy from the University of California, Irvine.

== Career ==
=== 1950s ===
Del Río Reyes' acting career in theater was launched in 1952 with her debut in the play, Contigo, pan y cebolla by Manuel Eduardo de Gorostiza in the Palacio de Bellas Artes, alongside Manolo Fábregas and under the direction of Salvador Novo. She would go on to have roles in other plays such as Un día de octubre by George Kaiser, Empire State by Lino Landy, La molinera de Arcos by Alejandro Casona; El juicio by Alfredo Pacheco Buenrostro and Por el ojo de una aguja by Carlos Prieto.

In 1957, Del Río Reyes wrote her first drama, Fraude a la tierra, a monologue that addresses the hardships of the Mexican emigrant laborers. She took it to Moscow and assumed the role of director and actress. It premiered on August 3 in the Malenki Theater during a festival. After returning from her first trip to Europe, she fulfilled her previous commitment to act in Fuenteovejuna by Lope de Vega and directed by Alvaro Custodio, even though it would be her last performance. Two years later, Del Río Reyes directed Fraude a la tierra in the Instituto Regional de Cuernavaca, with one of her theater students playing the role of the female protagonist.

She became a collaborator in 1958 for the cultural supplement section of the newspaper Excélsior in Mexico City where she published daily interviews. That same year, she began her teaching career as professor of dramatic arts in the Secretaría de Educación Pública. Her new position was to teach courses in Ciudad Sahagún. Shortly thereafter, she would join the Instituto Nacional de Bellas Artes y Literatura as professor of dramatic arts, teaching her classes in the Centro de Iniciación Artística in Cuernavaca and Atzcapotalco. As a drama critic, Del Río Reyes published during a period of ten years (1958–1968), the column Diorama teatral in the supplement Diorama de la Cultura using the pen-name Mara Reyes. She joined the Escuela de Arte Teatral de Bellas Artes in Mexico City where she remained as a professor until 1972.

=== 1960s and 1970s ===
Her literary production increased throughout the 1960s, specifically that of her plays. She would write dramas such as En las manos de Uno, Miralina, El hijo de trapo and Claudia y Arnot, these last three written in accordance with her manifest of relativist drama. El hijo de trapo won various regional and national awards in the competitions sponsored by the Instituto Nacional de Bellas Artes (INBA) such as the Premio Regional en Mérida during the third national theater competition there. Del Río Reyes also collaborated with other prestigious drama critics in publications about Mexican theater during this decade. Another literary achievement of hers is the writing of her short-story La bomba "L" in 1965 that years later would be converted into her first novel.

The 1970s continued bringing critical acclaim to Del Río Reyes' play-writing. El pulpo -Tragedia de los hermanos Kennedy- debuted in 1970 under the direction of Jorge Esma in the Teatro del Bosque in Mexico City. This documentary play about the controversy surrounding the deaths of John F. Kennedy and Robert F. Kennedy ended up winning the national prize Juan Ruíz de Alarcón for drama by the Asociación de Críticos de México. The commemorative plaque of its 100 stagings was revealed in the Teatro Reforma also in Mexico City, site to which it was moved after its inaugural season in the Teatro del Bosque. Her epic poem Trece Cielos, composed of alexandrine sonnets, won the national prize Olímpico in 1968 for poetry. However, in 1975, it was staged as a theatrical show by Joaquín Lanz in the Teatro de la Procaduría General de la República Mexicana. Later, it would be recorded on a disk commemorating the "International Year of Women".

Aside from her plays, Del Río Reyes' first novel Proceso a Faubritten was published in 1976. During this decade, she and her husband, Hermilo Novelo moved to Prague in 1972 upon being appointed as cultural attaché in the Mexican Embassy and remained there for five years. Between 1977 and 1979, Del Río Reyes was the head of Unidad de Relaciones Culturales Internacionales of the Ministry of Public Education in Mexico in which she created cultural projects such as the current Centro de Investigación y Documentación Teatral Rodolfo Usigli. In 1979, her diplomatic and civil service continued as she was once again appointed to be the cultural attaché in the Mexican Embassy in Brussels. Although much of her time was consumed by her diplomatic obligations in the Mexican Embassy, the articles, poems and essays she managed to write in her free time ended up being published in European journals.

=== 1980s ===
In the early 1980s, her husband was killed in a car accident while en route to a concert in San Miguel de Allende, Mexico in 1983. The following year, she paid tribute to his memory upon writing the monologue De camino al concierto and it ended up inaugurating the first Latin Theater festival in Los Angeles as well as winning the César prize for best play. Shortly thereafter, Del Río Reyes would take her award-winning monologue to Mexico and stage it in the Teatro Benito Juárez. The actor, Luis Miranda, would play the role of the violinist for both seasons and he received critical acclaim for his performance from drama critics. A plaque was placed in the Teatro Benito Juárez to celebrate its 100 stagings in 1985. After completing the exams she needed to take in order to finish her high school studies, she pursued a degree in Hispanic literature from the Universidad Nacional Autónoma de México and graduated in 1988. That same year, her novel La cripta del espejo was published as well as her historical play, Tlacaélel. At the age of 56, she would leave Mexico, complete her doctorate at the University of California, Irvine in one year, and accept a teaching position as Assistant Professor of Spanish at the University of Central Florida, where she would be promoted to Associate Professor and eventually Full Professor.

=== 1990s to present ===
Although she spent the 90's in the United States because of her newly acquired faculty position, she still dedicated time to her own creative writing. Her book of poems Homenaje a Remedios Varo, won the Letras de Oro first prize in poetry, and the University of Miami published it in 1993. Besides her writing, she also found time to continue painting and some of her art would be shown in galleries and museums in Miami, New York City and Washington, D.C.

Del Río Reyes retired from the University of Central Florida in 2004, after 14 years of service as a professor. The following year, she returned to Mexico and moved to the city of Cuernavaca. To this day, she continues writing, painting, teaching and receiving recognition for her literary contributions.

== Manifest of relativist drama ==
In 1961, during the process of writing the play En las manos de uno Auto no sacramental, Del Río Reyes was in favor of a renovation of drama and wrote a manifest titled Por un teatro relativista [In pro of Relativist Drama]. That play and the others that follow it in 1962: Miralina, Claudia y Arnot and El hijo de trapo were products of her new theater. These three plays in this orientation were published by Universidad Nacional Autónoma de México (UNAM) in 1965.

In her manifest “Por un teatro relativista” [In pro of Relativist Drama], Del Río Reyes proposes the creation of “un teatro que establezca vínculos con una realidad dinámica” [a drama that establishes ties with a dynamic reality](3). According to her dramatic proposal, drama is not able to show life as something static, but rather as an always changing process in movement. Del Río Reyes explains in her manifest that each moment of reality is lived by each person that participates in that reality in a different way. For that reason, a permanent reality does not exist, because there is not just one reality, but so many in which individuals participate in that moment. Thus, drama should show an infinite quantity of a person's identification with himself or herself and the infinite forms with the people that surround him or her.

== Death ==
Del Río Reyes died on 1 April 2022, at the age of 89.

== Awards and honors ==
Between the years 1968 to 2013, she has received over one hundred awards and certificates in international conferences.

- October 1968: Award and publication of her poetry book Trece cielos.
- May 1969: First place award for her short stories book Cuentos arcaicos para el año 3000 in Mexico City.
- September 1970: Won a commemorative plaque for Tragedia de los hermanos Kennedy.
- January 1971: National prize for El Pulpo and Tragedia de los hermanos Kennedy.
- 1976: Awarded the Smetana Medal in Prague, Czechoslovakia in recognition of her work on Mexican culture.
- 1978: Featured in Encyclopedia of Mexico and later in other encyclopedias, she also recorded talking books of her novel Proceso a Faubritten and some of her other poems for the Library of Congress in Washington D.C.
- December 1984: Won a commemorative plaque for De camino al Concierto.
- 1989: First place award by the Panamerican Theatrical Association in Los Angeles, California.
- 14 February 1992: Prized first place in poetry by España '92 and the Instituto de Estudios Ibéricos for her book Homenaje a Remedios Varo, sponsored by the European Community and University of Miami.
- 1998 - 2000: Her name was featured on various websites: Artes e Historia Diccionario de Escritores, State University of New York and State University, Binghamton.
- February 1998: Awarded for Distinguished Researcher Award of the College of Arts and Sciences from University of Central Florida and TIP (Teaching Incentive Program) by the State University, Florida.
- 27 July 1998: Awarded the Hispanic-American literature trophy by Instituto Literario y Cultural Hispanico in Madrid, Spain.
- 24 March 2000: Awarded the silver plaque for "excellence of her literary work" in Southeastern Conference of Foreign Languages and Literatures.
- 20 April 2002: Recognised for her merits by the Spanish Graduate Students Association (SAGA) at the University of Central Florida.
- 19 April 2003: Awarded the "certificate of appreciation" by SAGA at the University of Central Florida.
- February 2004: Awarded by the board of trustee from the University of Central Florida.
- April 2004: Awarded as a "merited professor" by the University of Central Florida.
- 8 December 2006: Recognised as a distinguished visitor from Puebla by Enrique Doger Guerrero.
- 30 May 2007: Celebrated 60 years of literary work (50 years as a playwright) at La Tallera.
- 7–10 July 2008: Composed theater performances in Puebla, Mexico, organised by the University of Tennessee-Knoxville.
- 9 March 2012: Awarded a commemorative plaque from the Mexican Civic and Patriotic Committee in Los Angeles.
- 26 April 2013- Awarded the "Citizen of the World" prize by the Universidad Internacional (UNINTER) in the Cine Morelos, Cuernavaca.

== Literary works ==
=== Poetry ===
- Música solar -Homenaje a Remedios Varo- (2009)
- Temps en Paroles (1960-1983) (1985)
- Trece cielos (1970)

=== Novels ===
- ...como en Feria (2009)
- La utopía de María (2003)
- La cripta del espejo (1988)
- Proceso a Faubritten (1976)

=== Short stories ===
- La Bomba L (1972)
- Cuentos arcaicos para el año 3000 (1972)

=== Plays ===
- ¿Quién dijo que soy Soldadera? (2012)
- ¿Homo sapiens? (2012)
- El atentado (2011)
- Un niño en Cuernavaca (2009)
- El sueño de la Malinche (2005)
- Felipe Carrillo Puerto: Una flor para tu sueño (1997)
- Virgen y Luzbél - Ensayando para una película- Libreto para cine (1972); Obra de teatro (1997)
- Año nuevo, vida nueva (1989)
- Tlacaélel (1988)
- De camino al Concierto (1984)
- Sol Nostrum (1978)
- La tercera cara de la luna (1978)
- En las manos de uno (1978)
- Entre hermanos (1978)
- La telaraña (1978)
- El pulpo -Tragedia de los hermanos Kennedy- (1971)
- Claudia y Arnot (1964)
- El hijo de trapo (1964)
- Miralina (1964)
- Fraude a la tierra (1957)

=== Essays ===
- El teatro de Alfonso Reyes. Presencia y actualidad (2013)
- Perfil y muestra del teatro de la Revolución Mexicana (1997)
- Requiem al Siglo XX. Luis Gutiérrez (1987)
- ¿Qué pasa con el teatro en México? (1967)
- 3 conceptos de la Crítica Teatral (1962)

== Bibliography ==
=== Published books ===
1. El teatro de Alfonso Reyes. Presencia y actualidad. Monterrey: Universidad Autónoma de Nuevo León, 2013.
2. ...como en Feria. México: Poliedro de “El Búho“, Instituto Politécnico Nacional, Fundación René Avilés Fabila, 2009. 266 pp.
3. La utopía de María. México: Fondo de Cultura Económica, 2003. 454 pp.
4. Homenaje a Remedios Varo. Homage to Remedios Varo. Translated by Joan Lindgren. Carpeta de Poesía Luz Bilingüe núm. 7. Tarzana: Luz Bilingual Publishing, 1999. 48 pp.
5. Perfil y muestra del teatro de la Revolución Mexicana. México: Fondo de Cultura Económica, 1997. 552 pp.
6. Perfil del teatro de la Revolución mexicana. New York, San Francisco, Bern, Baltimore, Frankfurt, Berlin, Vienna, Paris: Peter Lang, 1993. 278 pp.
7. Homenaje a Remedios Varo. Coral Gables: Iberian Studies Institute, 1993. 64 pp.
8. La cripta del espejo. México: Joaquín Mortiz, 1988. 384 pp.
9. Tlacaélel. México: Obra citada, 1988. 112 pp.
10. Réquiem al Siglo XX. Luis Gutiérrez. México: INBA, 1987.
11. De camino al concierto. Segunda ed. México: Universidad Autónoma Metropolitana -Xochimilco-, 1986. (Serie: Teatro Mexicano. "Dame el pie" núm. 6), 40 pp.
12. Temps en Paroles (1960-1983). Bilingual edition: French and Spanish, with Prologue and translation by Marcel Hennart. París: Caractères, 1985. 536 pp.
13. De camino al Concierto. Primera ed. México: Memoria, 1984. 30 pp.
14. Trece cielos. Segunda ed. Prólogo de Francisco Monterde. México: Unión Internacional de Escritoras, 1982. 96 pp.
15. Opus nueve. [Plays included: Sol Nostrum, La tercera cara de la luna, Claudia y Arnot, El hijo de trapo, Miralina, En las manos de uno, Entre hermanos, La telaraña y Fraude a la tierra] [Prologue and a Manifest by the author; Prologue to Miralina by Fernando Arrabal and comments about Miralina appeared in its first edition]. México: UNAM, 1978. 374 pp.
16. Proceso a Faubritten. Prologue by Ray Bradbury and back cover comments from Juan José Arreola. México: Aguilar, 1976. 352 pp.
17. Cuentos arcaicos para el año 3000. Monterrey: Ediciones Sierra Madre, 1972. 44 pp.
18. Trece cielos. [Book of poems, disc and pictures from the dramatic representation during theater season]. Prologue by Francisco Monterde. México: Voluntariado de la Procuraduría General de la República en el Año Internacional de la Mujer. Programa de México, 1975. 33 pp. [1ª ed.] Prologue by Francisco Monterde. México: Finisterre, 1970. 33 pp.
19. Miralina, El hijo de trapo, Claudia y Arnot, with “Comentarios sobre Miralina” by Juan José Arreola, Juan Rulfo, Fernando Sánchez Mayans, Rafael Barajas, Alejandro Jodorowsky, Miguel Sabido, Wilberto Cantón, Lya Engel, María Luisa Mendoza and Carlos Solórzano. México: Textos del Teatro de la Universidad de México, 1964. (Number 16 of the Collection), 94 pp.
20. Fraude a la tierra. México, unpublished, 1957. 14 pp.

=== Creative works in anthologies ===
1. ¿Homo sapiens? Dramaturgia a cuatro voces [Play]. Col. Voces vivas. Plays by Lorena Cantú, Marcela del Río, Raúl Moncada and Rubén Pizano. Cuernavaca: Instituto de Cultura de Morelos, 2012. 61-162.
2. “Estrategias dramáticas del Teatro de Ahora“ [Essay] in El Teatro de Ahora: un primer ensayo de teatro político en México. Coordinators: Israel Franco and Antonio Escobar Delgado. (Book and CD). México: Instituto Nacional de Bellas Artes and Literatura, Centro de Investigación Teatral Rodolfo Usigli (CITRU) and CONACULTA, 2011. 115–179.
3. “Celia.“ [Short story] “También a Cuernavaca.“ [Poem] “Un niño en Cuernavaca.“ [Play]. in Prisma. Coordinatores: Rubén Pizano and Frida Varinia. Cuernavaca: Sociedad de Escritores de Morelos, 2010. 146–52.
4. El sueño de la Malinche [Play] in Viajero sin equipaje. Ed. Norma Román Calvo. México: Pax, 2007. 53-102.
5. El sueño de la Malinche in Mujeres en las tablas. Eds. Cordones, Juanamaría and María Mercedes Jaramillo. Buenos Aires: Nueva Generación, 2005. 113–73.
6. On the Way to the Concert. [Play] Translated by Juan Bruce-Novoa and Marcela del Río. Five Plays in Translation From Contemporary Mexican Theater. A New Golden Age. Introduction by George Woodyard. New York: Edwin Mellen Press, 2001. 10–42.
7. A Elena Garro in memoriam in Baúl de recuerdos. Homenaje a Elena Garro. Eds. Mara L. García and Robert K. Anderson. Serie El Prestidigitador, 3 de la Universidad de Tlaxcala. México: El Prestidigitador, 1999, 1–3. 174 pp.
8. Terremoto, Tlatelolco, Faro, Huellas del tiempo -X. Poems in De la vigilia fértil. Antología de poetas mexicanas contemporáneas. Ed. Julian Palley. Collaborator: Aralia López González. México: Universidad Nacional Autónoma de México, University of California, Irvine, 1996. 61–69.
9. De camino al Concierto in Algunas obras del Teatro Mexicano Contemporáneo. Editor: Emma Teresa Armendáriz. Works by: Rodolfo Usigli, Emilio Carballido, Elena Garro, Marcela del Río, Tomás Urtusástegui, Nancy Cárdenas, Oscar Liera, Víctor Hugo Rascón Banda, Alejandro Licona y José Joaquín Cosío Osuna. México: Instituto Nacional de Educación para los Adultos, 1994. pp. 168–94. 427 pp.
10. Año nuevo, vida nueva [Drama] in Doce a las doce. Works by Alejandro Licona, Willebaldo López, Pilar Campesino, Tomás Urtusástegui, Miguel Ángel Tenorio, Antonio González Caballero, Tomás Espinosa, Dante del Castillo, Víctor Hugo Rascón Banda, Pablo Salinas, Norma Román Calvo and Marcela del Río. México: Obra citada, 1989. 183–202. 202 pp.
11. Ometéotl [Poetry] in Mystère et Matière. Edition and Introduction by Eugène Van Itterbeek. Lovaina: IV Festival Europeo de Poesía, 1982. pp. 50–51, 102 pp.
12. El pulpo –Tragedia de los hermanos Kennedy– [Drama] in Antología Teatro Mexicano 1970. [Authors included: Maruxa Vilalta, Marcela del Río, Vicente Leñero and Federico S. Inclán]. Prologue by Antonio Magaña Esquivel. México: Aguilar, 1973. 92-189. 358 pp.
13. La Bomba L [Short-story] in Antología de cuentos: Premios León Felipe. México: Finisterre, 1972. 69-105. 148 pp.

=== Poetry in textbooks ===
1. “Mimetismo” Poem (and bio-bibliographic references) in the Spanish textbook for high school (11th grade), titled BRAVO, by Tracy Terrell. McGraw-Hill, College Division, San Francisco. Authorized permission from McDougal, Littell & Company of Evanston, Illinois, 1995.

=== Drama on compact disc ===
1. De camino al Concierto, ¿Homo sapiens? y El sueño de la Malinche on the CDROM : Cien años de teatro mexicano (Celebración de los 100 años de la Asociación de Escritores de México y los 25 años de su rama de teatro: la SOGEM –Sociedad General de Escritores de México–.) México: SOGEM, 2002.

=== Articles (Essays and Interviews) in Anthologies ===
1. “El discurso dramático femenino frente a la sociedad de su tiempo, en autoras de distintos momentos de México, especialmente del siglo XX.” Alba de América. v.22. nums. 41 – 44. Julio 2003, 225–47.
2. “Metafísica, ironía y parábola en tres textos anfibios de Enrique Anderson Imbert.” La lógica del crítico en la creación lúdico-poética. Homenaje a Enrique Anderson Imbert. Ed. Juana Alcira Arancibia. Vol. VIII, col. Estudios Hispánicos. Westminster: Instituto Literario y Cultural Hispánico, 2001. 175–89.
3. “Perspectiva masculina y metapoética en la muerte, el tiempo, el pájaro, la piedra, el sueño y la palabra, en la inmemorialidad de América, a través de Maneras de luchar de Rubén Vela.” La pasión americana en la poesía de Rubén Vela. Ed. Juana Alcira Arancibia. Vol. VII, col. Estudios Hispánicos. Westminster: Instituto Literario y Cultural Hispánico, 2001, 207–21.
4. "Un café con Jorge Luis Borges." Borges. Nuevas lecturas. Ed. Juana Alcira Arancibia. Vol. VI, col. Estudios Hispánicos. Westminster: Instituto Literario y Cultural Hispánico: 2001, 253–58.
5. “Teatro histórico vs. teatro de ficción: Reflexiones personales sobre las diferencias en el proceso creador de un drama.” Fronteras finiseculares en la literatura del mundo hispánico. Ed. Vicente Granados Palomares. Madrid: Universidad Nacional de Educación a Distancia, 2000. 95-101.
6. “Especificidad y reconocimiento del discurso dramático femenino en el teatro latinoamericano.” Performance, Pathos, Política de los sexos. Frankfurt am Main: Vervuert Iberoamericana, 1999. 41–54.
7. “Soldaderas con fusil, pluma o bandera de huelga, generalas olvidadas de la Revolución Mexicana.” Las desobedientes: Mujeres de nuestra América. Eds. María Mercedes Jaramillo y Betty Osorio. Bogotá: Panamericana, 1997. 174–208.
8. “Carta a Luz Campana de Watts sobre el Encuentro con Jorge Luis Borges.” in Luz Campana de Watts' Un día en la vida legendaria del escritor. Jorge Luis Borges en Domínguez Hills University. Montevideo: Editorial Graffiti, 1995. 176–79.
9. “Materia del misterio." in Mistère et Matière. Ed. and Introduction by Eugène Van Itterbeek. Lovaina: IV Festival Europeo de Poesía, 1982. 14–17.
10. “Qué pasa con el teatro en México.” in ¿Qué pasa con el teatro en México? (Series of Conferences) Presentation: Luis Guillermo Piazza. Final commentary: Rafael Solana. Authors: Salvador Novo, Seki Sano, Luis Reyes de la Maza, Carlos Solórzano, Francisco Ignacio Taibo, Alejandro Jodorowsky, Lya Engel, Rodolfo Usigli, Celestino Gorostiza, Rafael Solana, María Luisa –China– Mendoza, Marcela del Río, Héctor Azar, Wilberto Cantón and Fernando Sánchez Mayans. México: Editorial Novaro, 1967. 165–171.
11. 3 Conceptos de la Crítica Teatral. [Series of Conferences] Prologue by Francisco Monterde. Authors included: María Luisa Mendoza, Antonio Magaña Esquivel and Marcela del Río. México: Textos del Teatro Estudiantil de la UNAM, 1962. 34–45.
