= Timur Batrutdinov =

Russian TV presenter and actor (born 1978)

- Тимур Батрутдинов
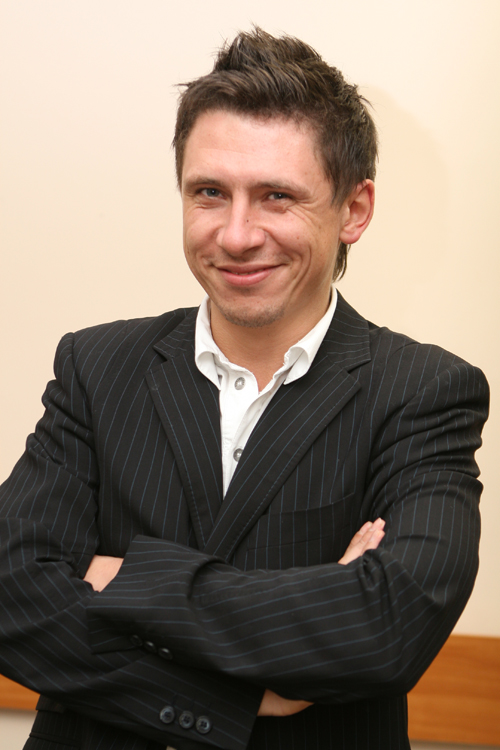
- Born: Timur Takhirovich Batrutdinov; February 11, 1978 (age 48); Voronovo, Moscow Oblast, Russian SFSR, Soviet Union
- Education: Saint Petersburg State University of Economics and Finance
- Occupations: Comedian; actor; television presenter

Timur Takhirovich Batrutdinov (Russian: Тиму́р Тахи́рович Батрутди́нов) (Tatar: Тимур Таһир улы Бәдретдинов; born 11 February 1978, Voronovo, Podolsky district, Moscow Oblast, USSR), also known by the nickname Kashtan (Russian: Кашта́н) is a Russian humorist, screen & TV actor, voice actor and dubbing presenter. He is one of the members of the show "Comedy Club" and a former member of the TV program KVN.

== Biography ==
=== Personal life ===
Batrutdinov has never been married and does not have children.

In 2015, he took part in the show "The Bachelor" on the TNT channel, and in the final he chose Daria Kananukha as his "bride." Three months after the end of the project they broke up.

He is a fan of the Kazan-based football club Rubin.
