= Ekaterina Litau =

Russian economist (born 1979)

- Екатерина Литау
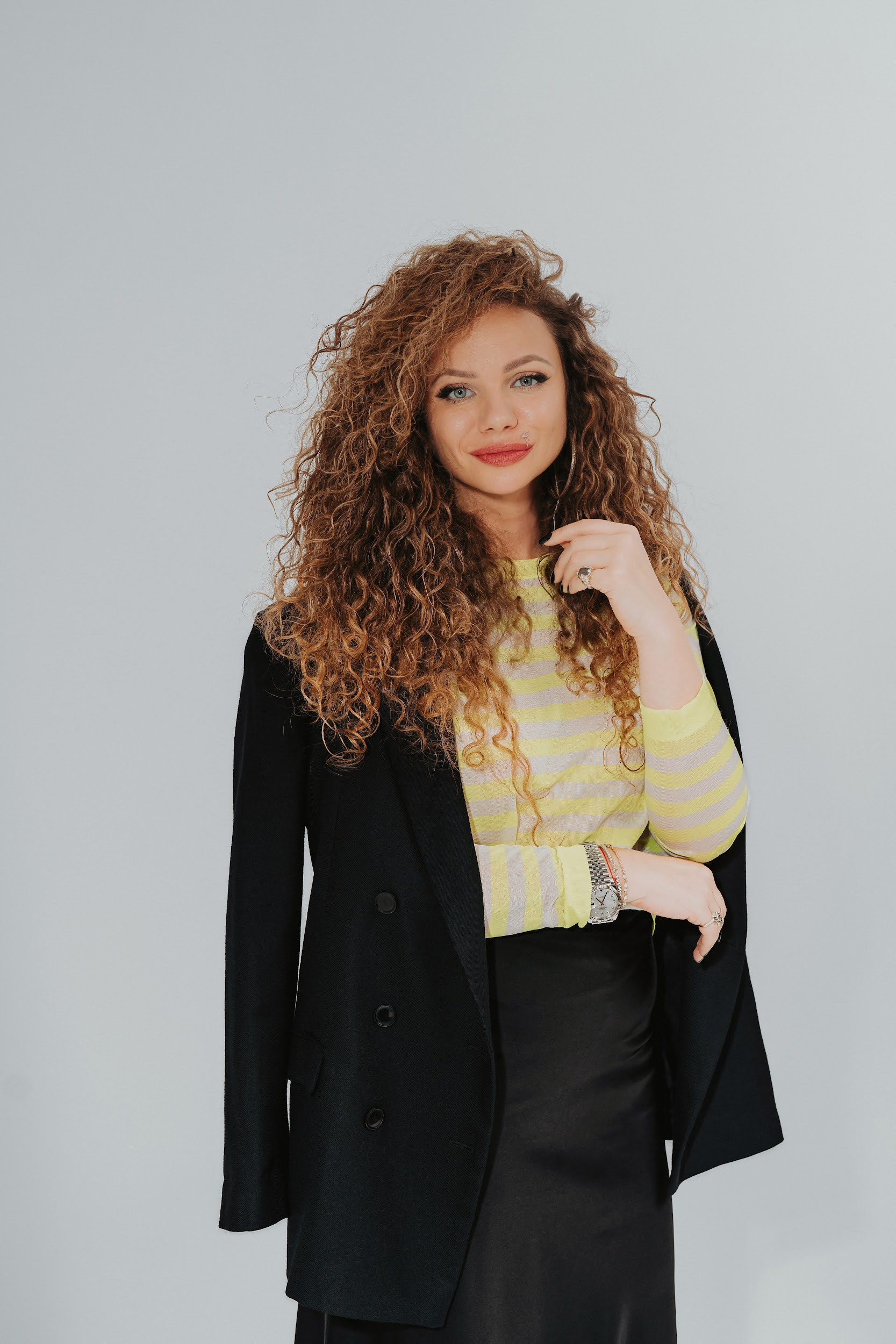
- Born: 4 April 1979; Leningrad, USSR
- Education: Saint Petersburg State University; Doctor of Science in Economics (2021)
- Known for: Specialist in the theory of entrepreneurship and entrepreneurial aesthetics
- Scientific career
- Fields: Economics
- Workplaces: Saint Petersburg State University of Economics; National Research University Higher School of Economics (Saint Petersburg); ITMO University; Saint Petersburg University of Technology, Management, and Economics

Ekaterina Yakovlevna Litau (Russian: Екатерина Яковлевна Литау; born April 4, 1979, Leningrad) is a scholar, professor, specialist in the theory of entrepreneurship, Doctor of Science in Economics.

== Education ==
Ekaterina Yakovlevna Litau was born on April 4, 1979, in Leningrad (Saint Petersburg).

In 2002, she graduated from the Faculty of Law of Saint Petersburg State University receiving a Master's degree in Economics in the specialty “Accounting, Analysis, and Audit” from the Higher School of Economics in Saint Petersburg. She completed her studies at the Faculty of Finance and Credit of the Saint Petersburg State University of Economics and Finance. In 2014, she defended her Ph.D. (Candidate of Science) in Economics. Thesis: “Theoretical and Methodological Principles in the Management of Developing Entrepreneurial Projects”. In 2021, she was awarded the degree of Doctor of Science in Economics (habilitation degree). Postdoctoral research and thesis: “Developing of the Entrepreneurial Humanistic Paradigm in the Innovation Economy”.

== Career ==
From 2010 to 2015, she worked as a lecturer at the Department of Business Analysis of the Saint Petersburg State University of Economics then from 2014 to 2019, she was Associate Professor at the Department of International Finance and Accounting at the Saint Petersburg University of Management Technologies and Economics, with from 2016 to 2023 a joint appointment as Associate Professor at the Faculty of Technological Management and Innovations at ITMO University.

From 2020 to 2021, she was Associate Professor at the Department of Management at the Higher School of Economics in Saint Petersburg. Since 2023, she has been Professor of the Department of Socio-Economic Systems Management at the Saint Petersburg University of Management Technologies and Economics.

== Scientific activity ==
=== Main research areas ===
Litau's research interests include:

- Theory of entrepreneurship.
- Modern models for managing developing entrepreneurial projects.
- Cognitive aspects of the formation of entrepreneurial structures.
- Aesthetic and ethical factors in the development of successful entrepreneurial projects.
- Entrepreneurial aesthetics.
- Entrepreneurial intelligence.

Litau has been an invited speaker at international conferences:

- Litau, E. (2018-09-20). "Information Flows Management as a Way to Overcome "Puberty Challenges" of a Small Enterprise". Proceedings of the 2nd International Conference on Business and Information Management. dl.acm.org. pp. 34–38. doi:10.1145/3278252.3278259. ISBN 978-1-4503-6545-1. Archived from the original on 2025-01-10.
- "Entrepreneurship and Economic Growth: A Look from the Perspective of Cognitive Economics". dl.acm.org. doi:10.1145/3271972.3271978. Archived from the original on 2024-06-13.
- "The information problem on the way to becoming a "Gazelle"". Scopus.
- "Cognitive science as a pivot of teaching financial disciplines". Scopus.

== Academic works ==
=== Monographs ===
- Теоретико-практическое обоснование методики оценки предпринимательских проектов : монография - Литау Е.Я. 2020. ISBN 978-5-94047-856-0.
- Предпринимательство в современной экономической парадигме : монография - Литау Е.Я. 2020. ISBN 978-5-94047-857-7.

=== Textbooks ===
- "ЭБС Лань". e.lanbook.com.
- "Лауреаты V Приволжского межрегионального конкурса вузовских изданий «Университетская книга - 2017»". www.unkniga.ru (in Russian).
- "Лауреаты VI Приволжского межрегионального конкурса вузовских изданий «Университетская книга - 2018»". www.unkniga.ru (in Russian).
- "Финансовое управление развивающимися проектами, Литау Е.Я., Издательство Лань, 2020 г." lanbook.com.

== Selected publications ==
- Литау Е.Я. "Принципы использования ИИ при управлении предпринимательскими проектами в рамках концепции проективной ответственности" (PDF). itmo.ru (in Russian).
- Литау Е.я, Холодов В.в (2024). "Управление экологически ориентированными предпринимательскими проектами с использованием инновационных цифровых технологий". Научный журнал НИУ ИТМО. Серия «Экономика и экологический менеджмент» (1): 60–68.
- Лебедевская О.А., Литау Е.Я. "Малое и среднее предпринимательство в условиях пандемии COVID-19" (PDF). itmo.ru (in Russian).
- Е. Я. Литау (18 May 2021). "Творчество как необходимый элемент развития предпринимательских компетенций". elpub.ru (in Russian). 27 (3): 165–174. doi:10.35854/1998-1627-2021-3-165-174.
- Ekaterina Y. Litau (2020-06-01). "Scoring method as applied to innovation project evaluation for startup support". Entrepreneurship and Sustainability Issues. 7 (4): 2978–2990. doi:10.9770/jesi.2020.7.4(27). ISSN 2345-0282.
- Ekaterina Y. Litau. "CONCEPT OF ENTREPRENEURSHIP ANTI-IDEOLOGY" (PDF). jssidoi.org.
- E. Litau (2018). "Information Flows Management as a Way to Overcome "Puberty Challenges" of a Small Enterprise". Proceedings of the 2nd International Conference on Business and Information Management. pp. 34–38. doi:10.1145/3278252.3278259. ISBN 978-1-4503-6545-1.
- "Litau E.Y. "Evolution of species" in business: From mice to elephants. The question of small enterprise development. Journal of Advanced Research in Law and Economics. 2017". scopus.com.
- Litau E.Ya. "Проблема управления финансами малого предприятия: теория информационной проблемы и новый подход к процессу изучения финансов" (in Russian).
- Litau Ekaterina Yakovlevna (2013). "Disclosure of entrepreneurship in the context of economic psychology". Russian Journal of Education and Psychology. 7 (27): 46.
