= State Commercial Bank of the Russian Empire =

Former public bank in the Russian Empire

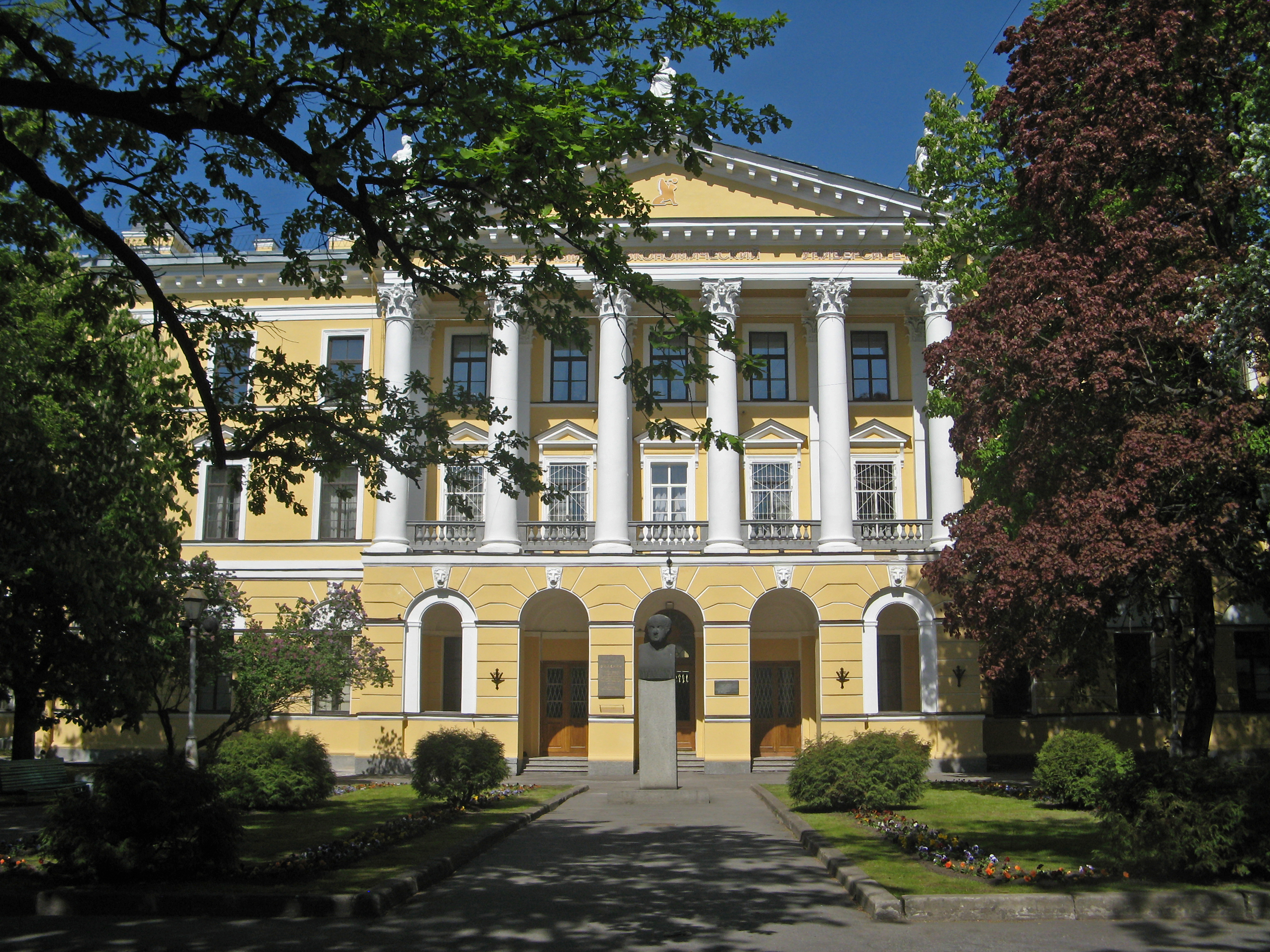
The former head office building of the State Commercial Bank, lately the Saint Petersburg State University of Economics

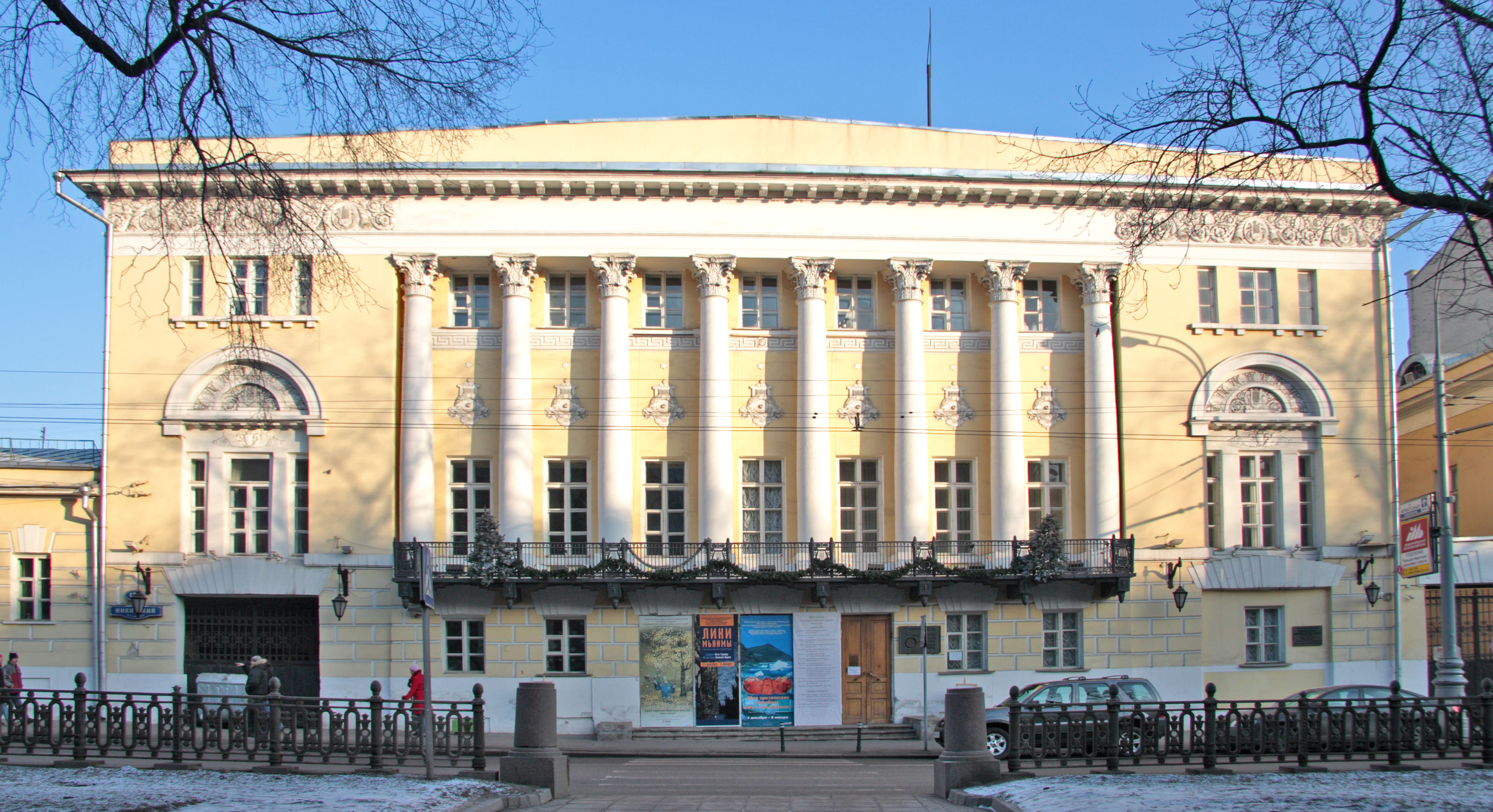
Lunins' House, the bank's former Moscow branch

The State Commercial Bank (Russian: Государственный коммерческий банк) was a public bank of the Russian Empire. It opened on 1 January 1818 (Old Style), largely replacing the Assignation Bank whose role as Russia's bank of issue had been undermined by inflation. Like the rest of Russia's state-owned banking system, it collapsed in the financial crisis of 1859-1860 and was succeeded in 1860 by the State Bank of the Russian Empire.

== Overview ==
In 1817, Minister of Finance Dmitry Guryev initiated a banking reform in Russia, and established the State Commercial Bank as part of that effort by converting the Saint Petersburg discount office of the Russian Assignation Bank into a stand-alone institution. The Council of State Credit Institutions was created simultaneously to oversee Russia's formal banking system, which at the time was entirely state-owned, and preparations also began for the reorganization of the State Loan Bank. The main goal of the banking reform was to promote the strengthening of credit, which, in turn, could contribute to the development of agriculture, industry, and trade.

Before the establishment of the bank, Count Guryev presented a report to the Emperor in the State Council, which outlined the main areas of activity of the future bank. It was assumed that the bank would carry out the following operations: storage of deposits in gold and silver bullion and in foreign currency; transfers of cash deposits following the example of the Hamburger Bank and Bank of Amsterdam (cashless transactions); acceptance of deposits with the accrual of interest on them; discounting of bills; loans for goods. Unlike the Assignation Bank, which was entirely state-governed, the State Commercial Bank included some prominent merchants on its governing board. Its deposits grew from 3 million rubles at the end of 1818 to 204 million by 1854.

The bank began its work with clients on 2 January 1818 (O.S.). The discount offices of the Assignation Bank outside of Saint Petersburg were closed, and instead of them the State Commercial Bank opened offices in 1818 in Moscow, in 1819 in Arkhangelsk and Odesa, in 1820 in Riga and Nizhny Novgorod, in 1821 in Astrakhan, in 1839 in Kyiv, in 1841 in Rybinsk, in 1843 in Kharkiv, in 1846 in Yekaterinburg and Irbit, and in 1852 in Poltava.

In 1822, the State Commercial Bank purchased the Lunins' House in Moscow to make it its branch in the city.

From the mid-1820s, the activity of the State Commercial Bank was constrained by the policies of finance minister Georg Ludwig Cancrin, who distrusted it as a possible vehicle for mercantile speculation. Cancrin gave preference to lending to the landed gentry and to the state by the State Loan Bank, at which the State Commercial Bank was directed to deposit significant amounts of money. By 1858, the bank had 240 million rubles in deposits but only 27 million in commercial loans and discounts, the rest (together with the 30 million of initial capital) being placed at the State Loan Bank.

From 1840, as part of the monetary reform initiated by finance minister Georg Ludwig Cancrin, the local offices of the State Commercial Bank were used to establish deposit offices in which Russians could exchange metallic money against deposit notes, and from 1843, receive credit notes in exchange of the old assignats issued until 1817 by the Assignation Bank. A decree of 9 July 1843 ordered the creation of a State Credit Note Bureau in Saint Petersburg, which thus became Russia's note-issuing body from then until 1860. The deposit notes of 1840 were in turn redeemed with credit notes. Credit notes were in theory fully convertible into silver but in practice that could only be done at the Credit Note Bureau in the capital. The State Commercial Bank's Moscow office was allowed conversion up to 3000 rubles, and in its other offices the maximum was 100 rubles.

In the late 1850s, the financial situation in the Russian Empire was severely affected by the aftermath of the Crimean War. A decrease in interest rates led to an outflow of deposits from state-owned banks, which accelerated into a bank run. The State Commercial Bank was liquidated, and the newly established State Bank of the Russian Empire took over its offices and managed the protracted liquidation process.

== See also ==
- Russian Assignation Bank
- State Loan Bank of the Russian Empire
