= Saint Petersburg State University of Engineering and Economics =

- Санкт-Петербургский Инженерно-Экономический Университет
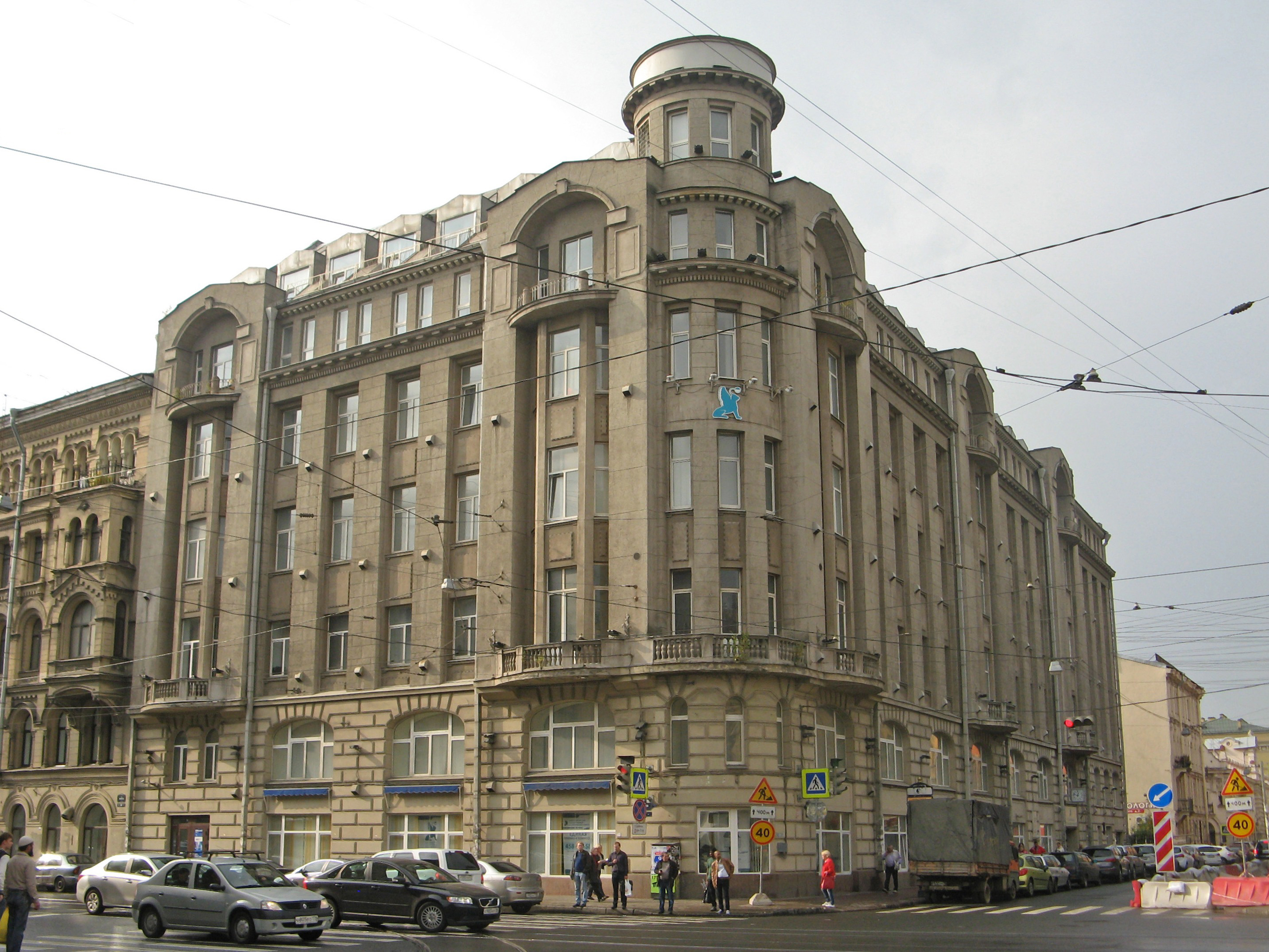
- Motto: Economic education for the welfare of Motherland
- Type: Public
- Established: 1906
- President: Olga Goncharuk
- Faculty: 1000
- Students: 27,200
- Location: Saint Petersburg, Russia; 59°55′37″N 30°21′08″E
- Campus: Urban
- Colors: Blue and white
- Website: engec.ru

The Saint Petersburg State University of Engineering and Economics was a public university in Russia, which was known as ENGECON (Russian: ИНЖЭКОН). It is now a part of Saint Petersburg State University of Economics, which was created via its merging with Saint Petersburg State University of Economics and Finance and Saint Petersburg State University of Service and Economics. It was specialized in the fields of economics, management, statistics, logistics and finance.

At the postgraduate level, it is a business school. At the undergraduate level, it also teaches economics.

The Saint Petersburg State University of Economics has an International branch outside the Russian Federation in Dubai. It is named Saint Petersburg State Economic University (Dubai branch).

== History ==
The history of the University begins in 1906 when Higher Commercial Courses of M.V. Pobedinski were arranged in Saint Petersburg. In 1919 the courses were altered into Institute of National Economy and in 1930 the Leningrad Institute of Engineering and Economics was set up. In 1992 the Institute received the Academy status and in 2000 the Academy became the University. On 1 August 2012 it was merged with Saint Petersburg State University of Economics and Finance and Saint Petersburg State University of Service and Economics to create Saint Petersburg State University of Economics.

== Study programs ==
Specialist degree (5 years). After receiving specialist degree students may apply for further postgraduate degree - Candidate of Sciences, which is equivalent to PhD. Major part of courses is given in Russian, though there are several programs given in English.

== Faculties ==
- Faculty of Business and Commerce
- Faculty of Humanities
- Faculty of IT in economics and management
- Faculty of Management
- Faculty of law and economic safety
- Faculty of Entrepreneurship and Finance
- Faculty of Regional Economics and management
- Faculty of tourism and hospitality
- Faculty of economics and management in machinery
- Faculty of logistics and transport
- Faculty of economics and management in the oil-gas-chemical complex and environmental safety
- Management of innovation Institute
- Higher school of Economics and Management

== Partner universities ==
Educational cooperation exists with universities. Language of instruction is English, though if students speak native language of the school it is possible to receive a stipend, which covers some costs (e.g. accommodation).

== Alumni ==
- Alexei Mordashov - main shareholder and the CEO of Severstal
- Anatoly Chubays - head of the Russian Nanotechnology Corporation, and a member of the Advisory Council for JPMorgan Chase.

== See also ==
- List of institutions of higher learning in Russia
