= State Loan Bank of the Russian Empire =

Former public bank in the Russian Empire

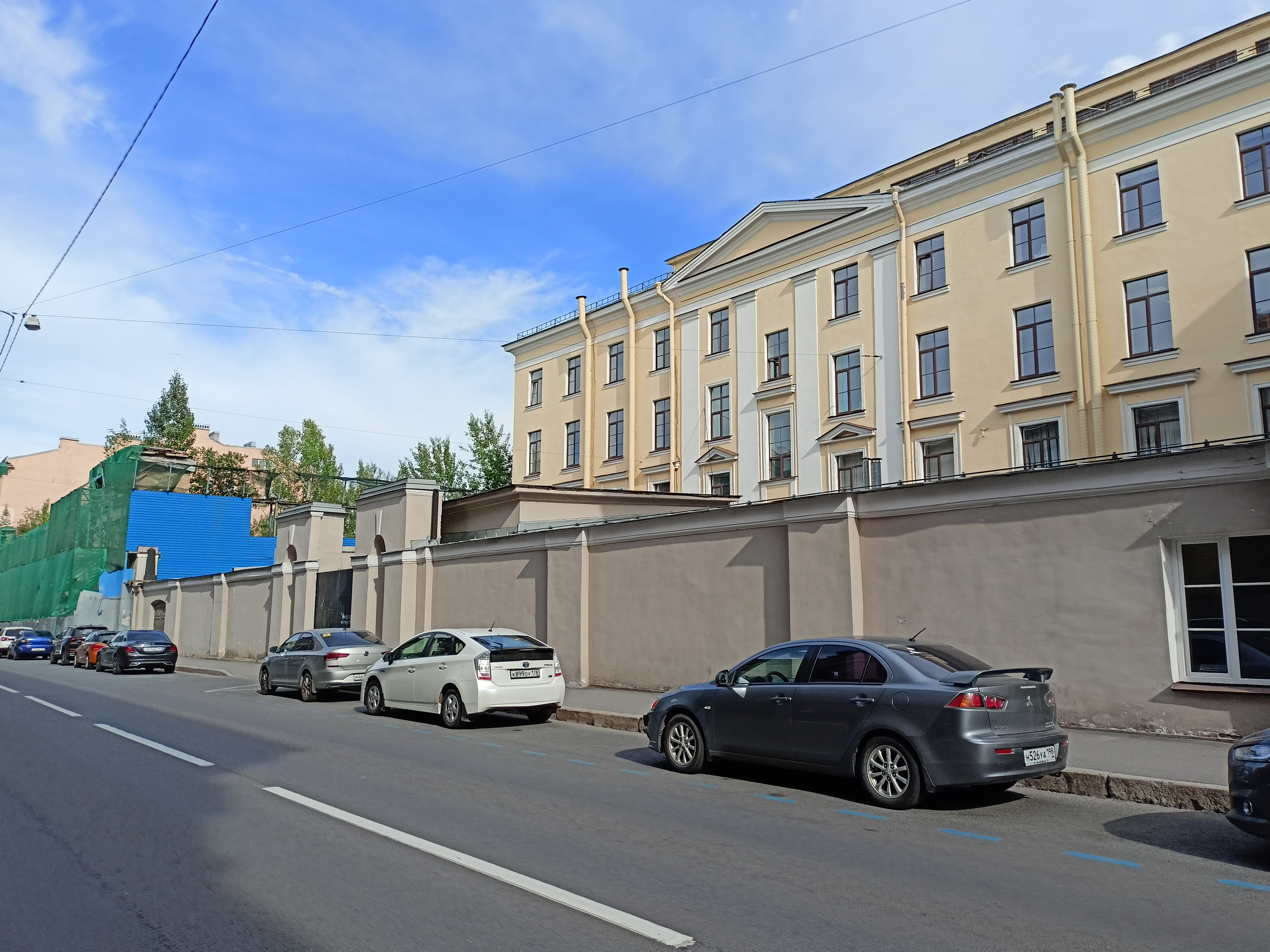
Former State Loan Bank building erected in the early 1790s in Saint Petersburg, lately part of ITMO University

The State Loan Bank (Russian: Государственный заёмный банк) was a public bank of the Russian Empire. It was initially created in 1754 in the form of two establishments in Moscow and Saint Petersburg, known as Bank of the Nobility, which were reorganized in 1786 as a single institution that was closely integrated with the note-issuing Russian Assignation Bank. The State Loan Bank kept a major role in Russia's state-dominated banking system until the late 1850s, when it collapsed and was replaced in 1860 by the State Bank of the Russian Empire.

== Overview ==
The initial establishment of the Nobility Banks in 1754 was intended to protect the gentry from the depredations of usurers, and was part of a decision package that also included dispositions to punish usury. They made mortgage loans at six per cent, but could not foreclose the pledged properties, only take temporary possession of them. In 1770, they started accepting deposits, but initially did not collect meaningful amounts.

Plagued by mismanagement and inadequate internal controls, the Nobility Banks were restructured in 1786 to form a single institution named the State Loan Bank. The Russian Assignation Bank was consolidated at the same time, and the two institutions were statutorily directed to operate as a single entity. Even after the reform, however, the State Loan Bank kept being affected by favoritism to politically influential aristocrats whose repayment behavior was poor.

In 1797, the government established within the State Moan Bank a Bill Discount Office, a Goods Mortgage Office, and an Insurance Office. The same year, it created the Auxiliary Bank of the Nobility, initially a competing institution that was significantly larger than the State Loan Bank, which was however merged into the latter in 1802.

The Russian institution of serfdom was integral to the business model of the State Loan Bank, in which the number of serfs gave a measure of the collateral value of land. In 1809, when the Grand Duchy of Finland was annexed by Russia, the absence of serfs on its territory prevented the activities of the State Loan Bank to be expanded there, and led instead to the creation of the separate Bank of Finland.

In 1821, finance minister Dmitry Guryev proposed to abolish the State Loan Bank, arguing that it had failed its aims to support Russian agriculture and industry. After Count Georg Ludwig Cancrin replaced Guryev as finance minister in 1823, however, he favored the State Loan Bank over its rival the State Commercial Bank, in line with his vision of a predominantly agrarian Russian economy. In May 1824, Cancrin decided to increase the State Loan Bank's capital so that it could expand its lending to the Russian landed gentry. To that effect, he directed the State Commercial Bank to deposit significant amounts at the State Loan Bank, which by 1839 represented slightly over half of the latter's deposit base. Cancrin also directed the State Loan Bank to lend large amounts to the Russian state itself, even though much of that activity was kept secret. Under Cancrin's policies, the State Loan Bank (like the State Commercial Bank) remunerated deposits at a fixed rate of four percent, which attracted vast volumes of deposits.

In 1859, the State Loan Bank experienced a severe deposit outflow which it could not handle by selling its illiquid agricultural loan portfolio. This bank run triggered the collapse of the entire state-owned banking system of Russia, including the State Commercial Bank and the public savings banks of Moscow and Saint Petersburg. The State Loan Bank was finally closed on 31 May 1860. The State Bank of the Russian Empire, established at the same time, was tasked with liquidating the accounts of the defunct State Loan Bank, a task that was only completed in 1887.

== See also ==
- Russian Assignation Bank
- State Commercial Bank of the Russian Empire
- Nobles' Land Bank
