= Saint Petersburg State University of Service and Economics =

Coordinates: 59°52′52″N 30°25′30″E

Saint Petersburg State University of Service and Economics-formerly Saint Petersburg Statte University of Economics now
- Санкт-Петербургский государственный университет сервиса и экономики
- Established: 1969
- Rector: Alexander Victorov
- Students: ~38,000
- Location: Saint Petersburg, Russia
- Website: http://www.unecon.ru/

Saint Petersburg State University of Service and Economics (Russian: Санкт-Петербургский государственный университет сервиса и экономики) was a university in Russia, located in Saint Petersburg. It was merged with Saint Petersburg State University of Engineering and Economics and Saint Petersburg State University of Economics and Finance to create Saint Petersburg State University of Economics. The university prepares economists, managers of productions, specialists in the financial area, bookkeeping calculation and Audit, information- analysts, specialists in service, engineers for the care of motor transport, complex household equipment, designers of clothing, artists of decorative skill and specialists in the region of socio-cultural service and tourism, of social workers, public relations specialists, journalists, sociologists, jurists, specialists of the trade and restaurant business for the enterprises of the small and mid-sized businessy.

== History ==
The history of St. Petersburg State University of Service and Economics starts from the Leningrad branch of Moscow Technological Institute of domestic service, which was open on 16 September 1969. In the beginning there were only four specialties of training. But requirements of the population in domestic service weren't satisfied enough, and the mission of the institute was to prepare the sufficient supply of highly qualified professionals not only for Leningrad enterprises, but for whole the North-West region.

Since 1990 institute starts to prepare the specialists by full-time training. In 1993 Leningrad branch of Moscow Technological Institute transformed into Technological Institute of Service. In 1999 it became independent as the St. Petersburg State Institute of Service and Economics (SISE). In 2002 by the order of the Ministry of education institute get the status of academy (SPbSASE), and in 2005 also by the order of Ministry of education - status of university (SPbSUSE). Now SPbSUSE is the only university in St. Petersburg, Leningrad region and all the areas of the North -West region of Russian Federation that prepares specialists with higher education in service, including domestic service, household facilities and equipment in spectrum of economical, technical, technological and social-culture specialties...

== Faculties ==
The university is made up of 8 specialized faculties (departments):

- Service Enterprises Economy and Management

- Regional Economy and Management

- Tourism and International Economic Relations

- Social Science and Management of Social Processes

- Arts and Crafts and Design

- Motor Transport, Municipal Engineering and Household Facilities Service

- Trade and Restaurant Business

- Law
