= Russian Assignation Bank =

Former public bank in the Russian Empire

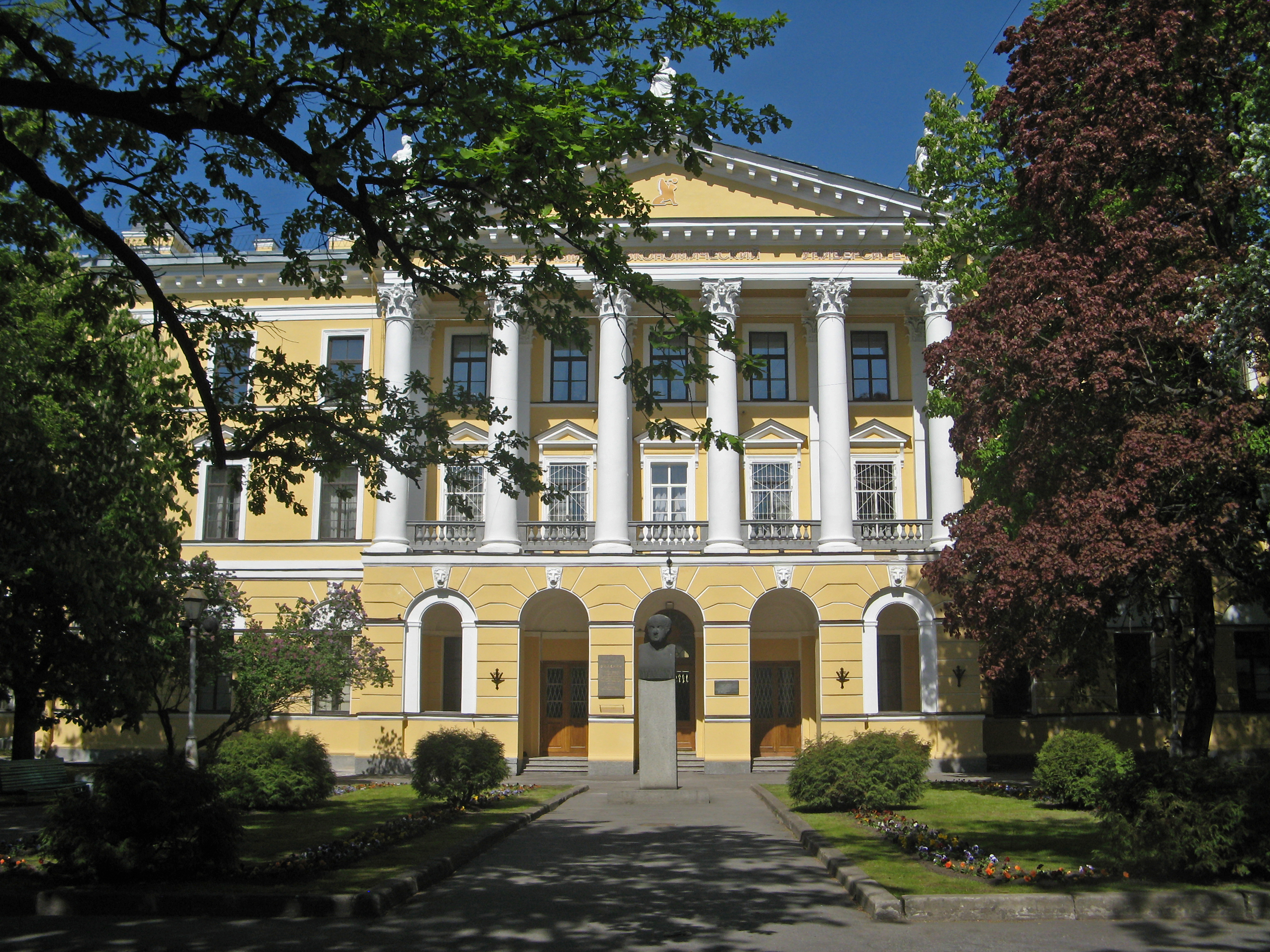
The former Saint Petersburg building of the Assignation Bank, lately the Saint Petersburg State University of Economics

The Russian Assignation Bank or State Assignation Bank (Russian: Государственный ассигнационный банк), sometimes referred to as Assignat Bank, was a bank of issue in the Russian Empire, established in early 1769 by Catherine the Great. In terms of volume of issuance, it was the largest of its time, well ahead of the Bank of England in the late 18th and early 19th centuries. It was abolished in 1817 and partly replaced by the State Commercial Bank of the Russian Empire.

== History ==
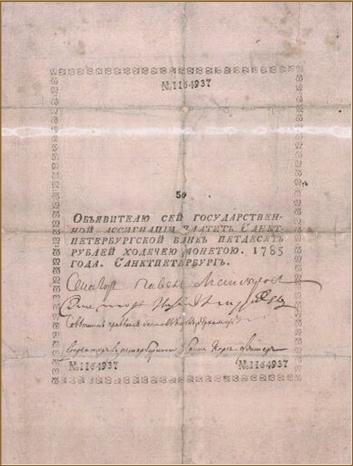
1769 Assignation Bank note of 50 rubles

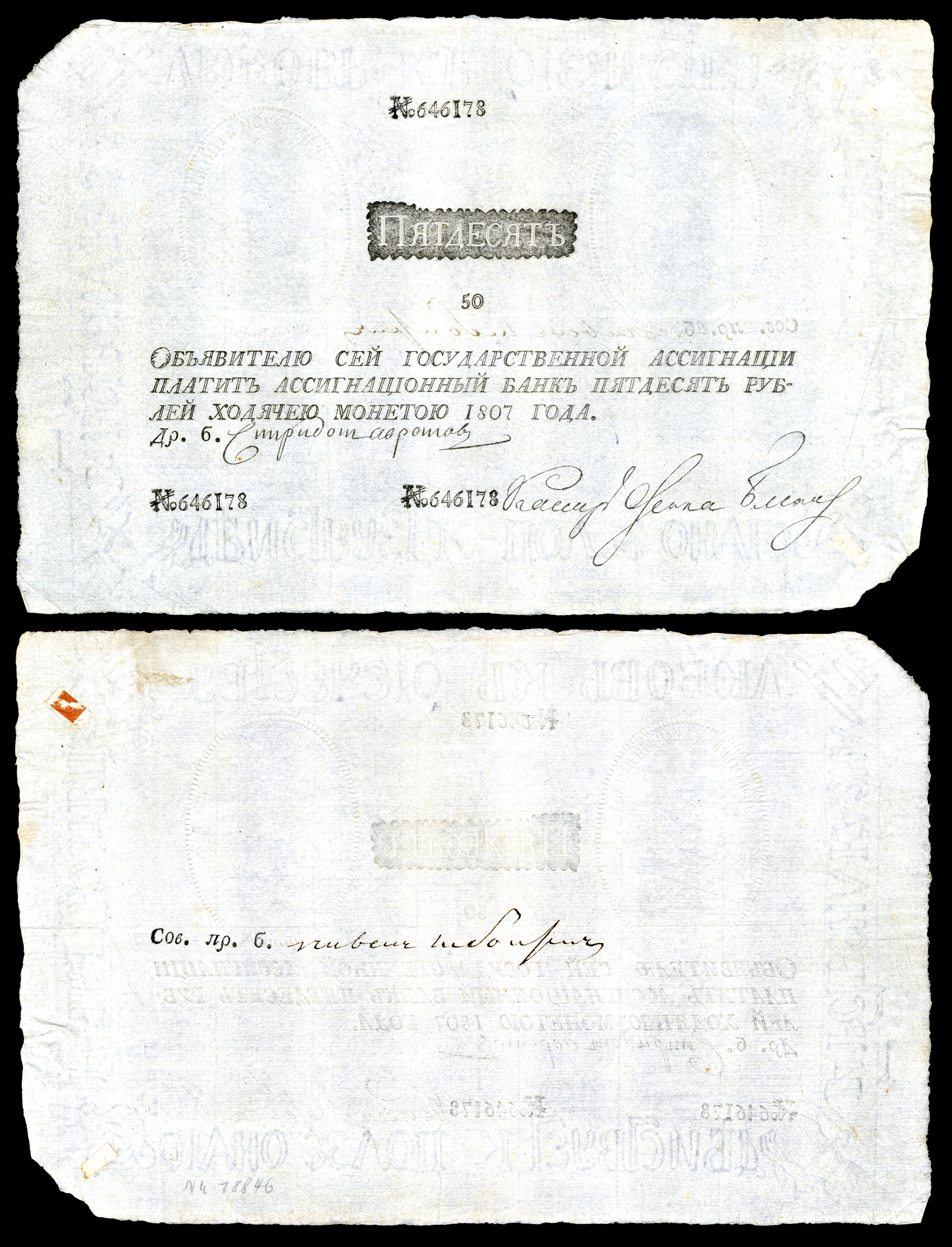
1807 Assignation Bank note of 50 rubles

The first attempt to organize a public bank of issue in Russia was the decree "on the foundation of a State Bank" signed on 5 June [O.S. 25 May] 1762 by Emperor Peter III. Because of Peter's assassination a few weeks later, however, that initiative was not implemented.

In 1768, taking inspiration from the Riksens Ständers Bank of Stockholm, Count Karl von Sievers wrote a memorandum recommending to Empress Catherine II the creation of a bank to issue paper money (French: assignats) that would be convertible into specie and would facilitate the financing of the then ongoing Russo-Turkish War. On 6 January 1769 [O.S. 29 December 1768], Catherine signed the imperial decree establishing two state bank offices, respectively in Saint Petersburg and Moscow, each of them endowed with a capital of 500,000 rubles.

In order to facilitate the exchange of banknotes, additional banking offices were opened in Yaroslavl (1772), Smolensk, Veliky Ustyug, Astrakhan, Nizhny Novgorod, and Vyshny Volochyok (1773), and for each of them banknotes were issued for 150,000 to 200,000 rubles. Later openings occurred in 1776 in Tobolsk (1 million rubles), in 1779 in Irkutsk (500,000 rubles), in 1781 in Pskov, Veliky Novgorod, Tver, Nizhyn, Kyiv, Kursk, Kharkiv, Tambov, Oryol, and Tula (200,000 rubles each), and In 1782 in Kazan and Kherson (300,000 each), Arkhangelsk and Riga (200,000 each), and Reval (100,000 rubles). The activities of these local offices were not successful, however, and in 1788, 16 of them were closed. In Saint Petersburg, the bank's main building was erected from 1783 to 1789 on a design by Giacomo Quarenghi.

In 1784, Catherine decreed that the bank should not issue more than 20 million rubles in paper money, a limit that was raised to 100 million in 1786. That year, the Assignation Banks were re-organized into a single institution named the State Assignation Bank. The State Loan Bank was consolidated at the same time, and the two institutions were statutorily directed to operate "as one, aiding each other for the successful prosecution of affairs".

In 1799–1805, the buildings of the bank also housed the Saint Petersburg Mint, which produced coinage.

In 1794 following the Partition of Poland, the issue of banknotes was extended to the annexed regions; new bank offices were thus established in Vilnius, Grodno, and Kovno.

The total number of banknotes issued under Catherine II amounted to 158 million rubles. Their value fluctuated but did not fall below 70 silver kopecks per paper ruble, and even reached 98 at one point in 1786. After Catherine's death in 1796, however, the inflationary pressures intensified and the silver ruble value of the banknotes fell to 69 percent in 1796, 66 percent in 1800, and 20 percent in 1814. By 1817, the number of banknotes amounted to 836 million paper rubles.

In the early 1810s, an attempt at reform was initiated by Russian Secretary of State Mikhail Speransky, which result in the establishment of the Bank of Finland but was cut short in Russia by the French invasion in mid-1812.

In 1817, the issuance of new banknotes by the State Assignation Bank was terminated, while its discount office in Saint Petersburg was reorganized as the State Commercial Bank of the Russian Empire and the other offices were closed. Even after the bank ceased activity, its notes continued to circulate until they were withdrawn in the 1840s as part of the monetary reform initiated by finance minister Georg Ludwig Cancrin that temporarily returned Russia to the silver standard.

== See also ==
- Bank of Prussia
- Caisse d'Escompte
