= Ilia Rodov =

Israeli professor of Jewish art

- איליה רודוב
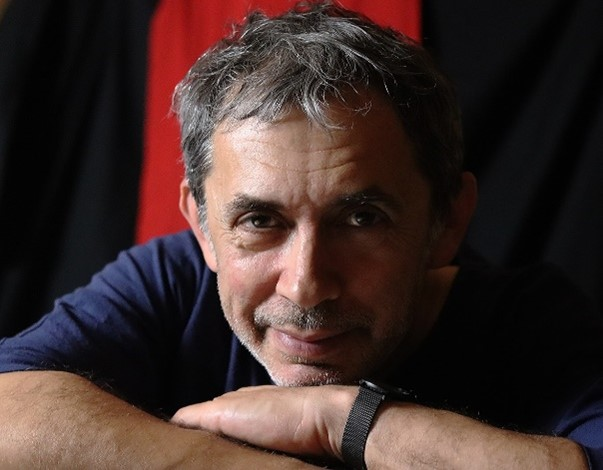
- Ilia Rodov in 2022
- Education: Imperial Academy of Arts (MA), Hebrew University of Jerusalem (PhD), Saint Petersburg Repin Academy of Arts
- Scientific career
- Workplaces: Bar-Ilan University

Ilia Rodov (Hebrew: איליה רודוב) is a historian of art and researcher of Jewish visual culture. He is a professor at the Department of Jewish Art and holds The Samson Feldman Chair in History and Culture of East European Jewry at Bar-Ilan University.

== Biography ==
Ilia Rodov was born in Bobruisk (Belarus). His father Mikhail Rodov and ancestors of his mother Raya Vorobeychik were decorative painters. With the liberalization of Soviet national politics under Perestroika, Rodov advocated the consolidation of the Jewish Community in Bobruisk. He was the founder and first president of the Mendele Moykher-Sforim Jewish Culture Club, which was established in Bobruisk in September 1988. He also published a literary and art anthology "Avanim", organized an ulpan, and taught Hebrew. In 1991, he emigrated to Israel, and currently lives in Mazkeret Batya.

== Education ==
Ilia Rodov was educated at the Serov Art Institute (former Tavricheskaya Art School at Saint Petersburg) and graduated summa cum laude in Theory and History of Arts from the Imperial Academy of Arts. He received his Ph.D. degree at the Department of Art History, the Hebrew University of Jerusalem.

== Career ==
Ilia Rodov is professor at the Department of Jewish Art and holds The Samson Feldman Chair in History and Culture of East European Jewry at Bar-Ilan University. He is also the editor-in-chief of "Ars Judaica: Bar Ilan Journal of Jewish Art" and a co-editor of "Jews, Judaism, and the Arts" book series at Brill Academic Publishers.

Ilia Rodov began his academic career by teaching at the departments of Art History and Jewish and Comparative Folklore, the Hebrew University of Jerusalem. He joined the faculty of Bar-Ilan University as a lecturer at the Department of Comparative Literature, then took a tenured position at the Program for Jewish Art. He served as the founding chair of the Department of Jewish Art (2014–2020) and directed the establishing of the graduate academic programs in Jewish Art History and in Art Therapy. From 1999 to 2005, Rodov worked at the Hebrew University of Jerusalem as a Director of the Chais Center Academic Programs for Jewish Studies in the Republic of Belarus.

== Research ==
Rodov investigates Jewish visual culture and ritual architecture. His publications and lectures explore the history, patronage, semantics, function, and perceptions of images, sculptures, architectural decoration, and furniture design from comparative, intercultural, and phenomenological perspectives. He focuses on the manifestations of sanctity in Jewish religious art, architecture, and microarchitecture. He also studies the Hebrew and pseudo-Hebrew inscriptions in Christian art, and historiography of Jewish art and architecture.

Rodov conducted research projects supported by the Israel Science Foundation and German-Israeli Foundation for Scientific Research and Development. He is also involved in the study and representation of Israeli artists born in the Soviet Union and the Former Soviet Union.
