= Voronovo (village) =

Selo in Moscow Oblast, Russia

Voronovo Во́роново
- Selo
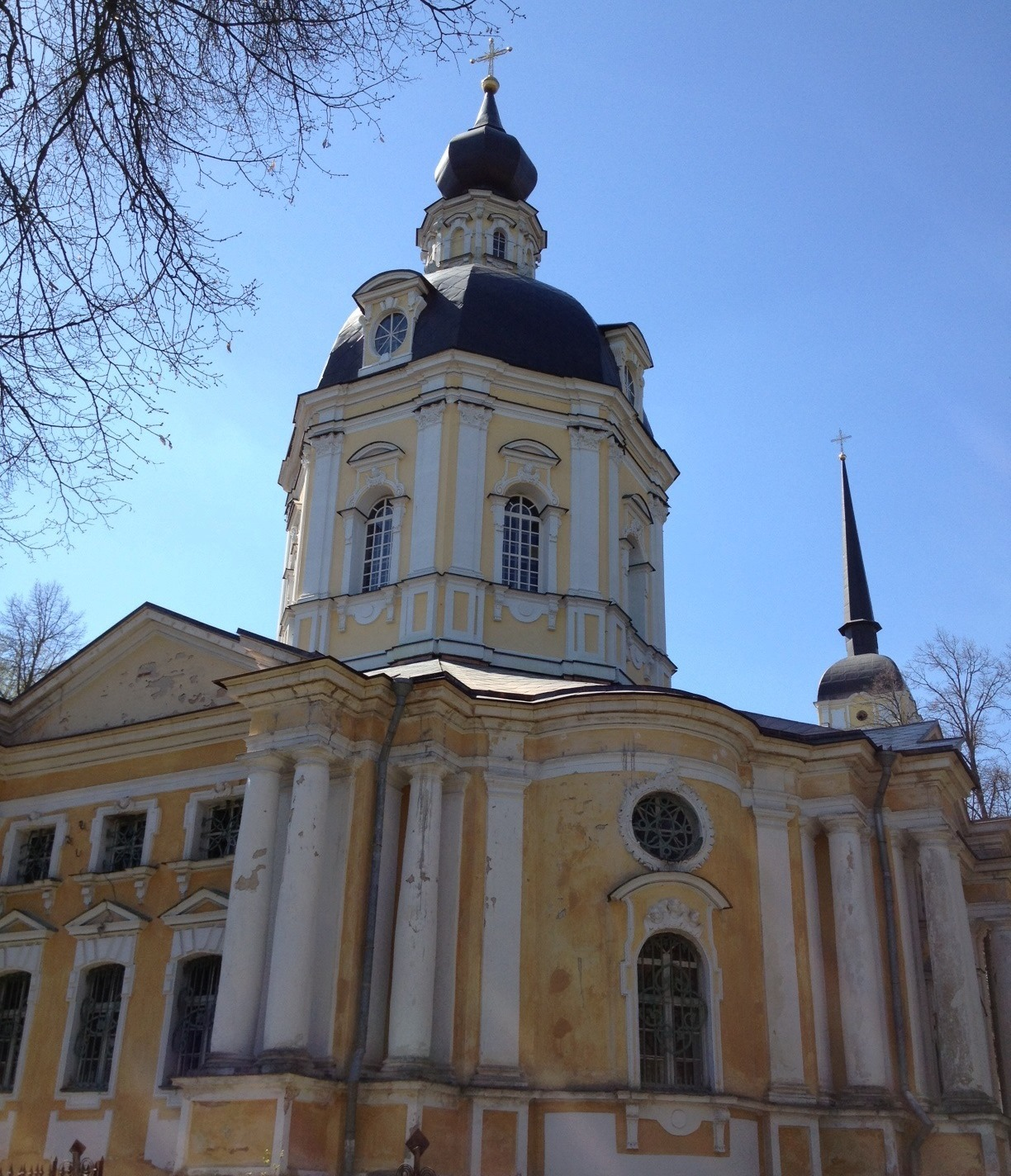
- Interactive map of Voronovo
- Location of Voronovo Voronovo (Moscow)
- Coordinates: 55°19′13″N 37°09′36″E
- Country: Russia
- Federal subject: Moscow

Population (2010 Census)
  - Total: 301
  - Estimate (2010): 301 (0%)

Administrative status
  - Subordinated to: Troitsky Administrative Okrug

Municipal status
  - Municipal district: Voronovo District
- Postal code: 108830

Voronovo (Russian: Во́роново) is a selo (village) in the Troitsky Administrative Okrug of Moscow (until July 1, 2012, it was part of the Podolsky District of Moscow Oblast). It has been part of the Voronovo municipal district since 2024.

== Population ==
As of 2005, the village had a population of 320 people.

== Attractions ==
The Church of the Holy Face of Christ, done in the Baroque style, was consecrated in 1763. In 1949, the estate was converted into a holiday home, with only the church now open to the public.

In 1974, a new building for the holiday home was constructed according to a design by the Central Research Institute of Epidemiology and Environmental Protection for Health Resort Buildings; the project manager was Ilya Chernyavsky, the architect was I.A. Vasilevsky, and the engineer was V.I. Malts). It became one of the most significant projects in the oeuvre of Ilya Chernyavsky. The building, with its variable relief, is an example of Soviet modernism. In the 2000s, it underwent reconstruction, during which part of the authentic 1970s interior was lost.
