= Malenki Theater =

Malenky Theater is a theater company based in Tel Aviv, Israel. The company was founded in 1997 by a group of immigrants from the former Soviet Union and specializes in the adaptation of classical literary works.

== History ==
Malenky Theatre was created as a “live theatre” - an experimental showcase for plays based on literature as source material, deciphering them in a “theatre laboratory” during the rehearsals and giving them a unique twist.

In 2006 Malenky was recognized as a Theatre group by the Ministry of Culture of Israel. The theatre is supported by both Ministry of Culture and Sport of Israel and City Council of Tel Aviv.

Over 20 years of its existence the theatre produced 40 shows, mainly in Hebrew, but some of them in Russian. In the current program, there are six shows.

In 1997-2014 Igor Berezin was the Artistic Director of Malenky Theatre and the director of most of the shows. Since 2015 the Artistic Director has been Michael Teplitsky.

In December 2017 Malenky Theatre released in collaboration with Habima National Theatre a performance “Zemach” - a stage play by Michael Teplitsky based on biography of Nahum Zemach - one of the three founders of Habima Theatre - a project is dedicated to a centenary celebration of Habima Theatre.

In 2016 Malenky Theatre took part in an exhibition at Jewish Museum in Berlin with a costume from the show “Golem”

Malenky Theater participated in many international theater festivals in France, Hungary, China, Croatia, Poland, South Korea, Serbia, Macedonia, Moldova and Russia.

== Awards ==
- 2023 - The "Golden Hedgehog" award was awarded to Dodo Niv as a supporting actor in the play "Othello"
- 2022 - The "Golden Hedgehog" award was given to Dodo Niv as the actor of the year in the play "Amok"
- 2020 - The "Golden Hedgehog" award was given to the show "Free Fall" as "Show of the Year"
- 2018 - Award for "Best Performance" Festival VI Incognita Terra

St. Petersburg, Russia for the play "Lear. Puppets and People

- 2016 «A team actor award» for the show “The Bastard’s Story (Lear. Puppets and People)” at 29th International Theatrical Festival Valise (Poland)
- 2014 Rozenblum Prize - a prize for outstanding achievements in the theatre field - awarded to Igor Berezin
- 2013 “Golden Hedgehog” prize awarded to Vadim Keshersky for the set design of the show “The Black Monk”
- 2012 Yuri Shtern prize - a prize for outstanding achievements of immigrant artists awarded to Michael Teplitsky
- 2010 Mifal HaPayis Landau prize - a prize for significant contribution towards cultural activities awarded to Igor Berezin
- 2009 “Golden Hedgehog” prize awarded to Polina Adamov for the set design of the show “Orpheus in Metro”
- 2009 The audience prize at International Monodrama Festival “The One Show”, Bitola, Macedonia awarded for the show "Orpheus in Metro"
- 2007 The show “About the Sin” earned “Golden Hedgehog” prize in three nominations: best director (Igor Berezin), best adaptation (Igor Berezin, Boris Entin), best-supporting actor (Dudu Niv)
- 2005 The Best Israeli Theatre Prize for the show “The Stranger” by Albert Camus as the Fringe Show of the Year 2005
- 2001 Michael Teplitsky earned the first prize at “Teatroneto” Festival for the show “Kontrabass” by Patrick Suskind

== Performances ==
Malenky Theater Performances

- 2024 - "Shapira" a play by Carol Siddon, directed by Michael Teplitsky
- 2023 - "Life According to Bashevis" play by Ola Preminger, directed by Michael Teplitsky
- 2023 - "Carnival of animals" Saint-Saëns. In collaboration with the Israeli Chamber Orchestra
- 2022 - "Othello" a play by William Shakespeare, directed by Michael Teplitsky
- 2022 - "A story and a half" a documentary play about the 1.5th generation of the Aliyah from Israel
- 2021 - "Amok" a play by Stefan Zweig, directed by Michael Teplitsky
- 2021 - "Russian Roulette" a play by Michael Baranovsky, directed by Yuri Goldin
- 2021 - "Russian Roulette" A play by Michael Baranowski, directed by Yuri Goldin
- 2019 - "Warshaw Melody" A play by Leonid Zorin, directed by Michael Teplitzky
- 2019 - "Free Fall" The play directed by Lena Rosenberg and Michael Teplitzky
- 2019 - "Mozart and Slayer" directed by Michael Teplitzky
- 2018 - "Ha-fa-na-na" directed by Michael Teplitzky
- 2018 - "The Story of the Panda Bears Told by a Saxophonist Who Has a Girlfriend in Frankfurt

" based on a play by Mattie Vishniak. Directed by Alexander Bergman (Russia)

- 2017 - "Zemach" A play directed by Michael Teplitzky, inspired by the life of Habima founder Nahum Zemach (co-production with the Habima National Theater)
- 2017 - "Will it never be a War" based on a play by Michael Heifetz that is based on the book by Istvan Arkan. Directed by Michael Teplitzky
- 2017 - "Alice and the Old Circus", directed by Michael Teplitzky
- 2017 - "Snow Story" by Leon Moroz, directed by Leon Moroz
- 2016 - "Abandoned Ash" by Michael Baranowski, directed by Yuri Goldin
- 2016 - "The Chairs" by Agen Ionescu, directed by Michael Teplitzky
- 2015 - "The Stranger" An adaptation of the story of Sergei Dobletov (play in Russian), directed by Michael Teplitzky
- 2015 - "Strawberries in the Summer" by Rona Monroe, directed by Rudia Kozlowski
- 2015 - "Lear. The Bastard Story", based on the play "King Lear" by William Shakespeare, directed by Michael Teplitzky
- 2015 - "The Kislev List" Documentary play, directed by Michael Teplitzky
- 2014 - "Wanted, an Educated, desperate young man", the play by Yafim Rinenberg inspired by diaries by Theodor Herzl, directed by Yafim Rinenberg
- 2014 - "On the Net" An adaptation of Fyodor Dostoevsky's book " Notes from Underground "
- 2013 - "Talk to Me Like Rain" - 2 short plays by Tennessee Williams, directed by Igor Berzin
- 2012 - "The Black Monk" based on a play by Anton Chekhov, directed by Igor Berzin
- 2011 - "The Golem" according to the myth of the golem in Jewish occultism, directed by Igor Berzin
- 2010 - "Job" An adaptation of Joseph Ruth's book, directed by Igor Berzin
- 2009 - "Orpheus in the Metro" A solo performance based on his short story by Julio Kortsar, directed by Igor Berzin
- 2008 - "The Immigrants" based on a play by Slavomir Marozek, directed by Igor Berzin
- 2007 - "On Sin" based on a novel by Fyodor Dostoevsky, directed by Igor Berzin
- 2006 - "Woyzeck" play by Georg Büchner, directed by Igor Berzin
- 2005 - "Murder on Goat Island" A play by Ugo Betty, directed by Igor Berzin
- 2005 - "The Rose of Jericho", an original play by Roi Chen, directed by Igor Berzin
- 2004 - "The Stranger" based on a novel by Albert Camus, directed by Igor Berzin
- 2003 - "The Old Woman and the Miracle Worker" based on the works of Daniel Harmes, directed by Igor Berzin
- 2001 - "Double Bass" by Patrick Suskind, solo performance by Michael Teplitsky, directed by Igor Berzin
- 2000 - "Absolutely Dress Rehearsal" A play by Sabba Jacobsdottir, directed by Igor Berzin
- 1998 - "The Last Demon" based on the stories of Yitzhak Bashevis-Singer, directed by Igor Berzin
- 1997 - "The Game" A play by Anthony Sheffer, directed by Igor Berzin
