= Saint-Petersburg State Economic University (Dubai branch) =

- Type: State University
- Established: 2005
- Rector: Igor A. Maksimtsev
- Location: Dubai, UAE
- Website: http://www.unecon.ae http://www.unecon.ru

Saint-Petersburg State Economic University (Dubai branch) is a branch of Saint-Petersburg State Economic University (Russia), Which started its operations in Dubai, United Arab Emirates in 2005.

Saint-Petersburg State Economic University is One of the largest economic university in Russia with more than 50 000 students. The Saint-Petersburg State University has 40 Bachelor's and 90 Master's degree programs. On top of that they have over 20 regional and international branches across the global.

== Accreditation and recognition ==
The University has a license and accreditation certificate issued by the Ministry of Education and Science of the Russian Federation, as well as authorized by KHDA and licensed by DMCC for educational activities.

== Academic programs ==
=== Undergraduate ===
- Bachelor of Management
- Bachelor of Tourism and Hotel Management
- Bachelor of Logistics Management

=== Postgraduate ===
- Master's programme in International Tourism Business
- Master's programme in petroleum and crew technology management
