= Saint Petersburg State University of Economics =

Public university in Saint Petersburg, Russia

- Санкт-Петербургский государственный экономический университет
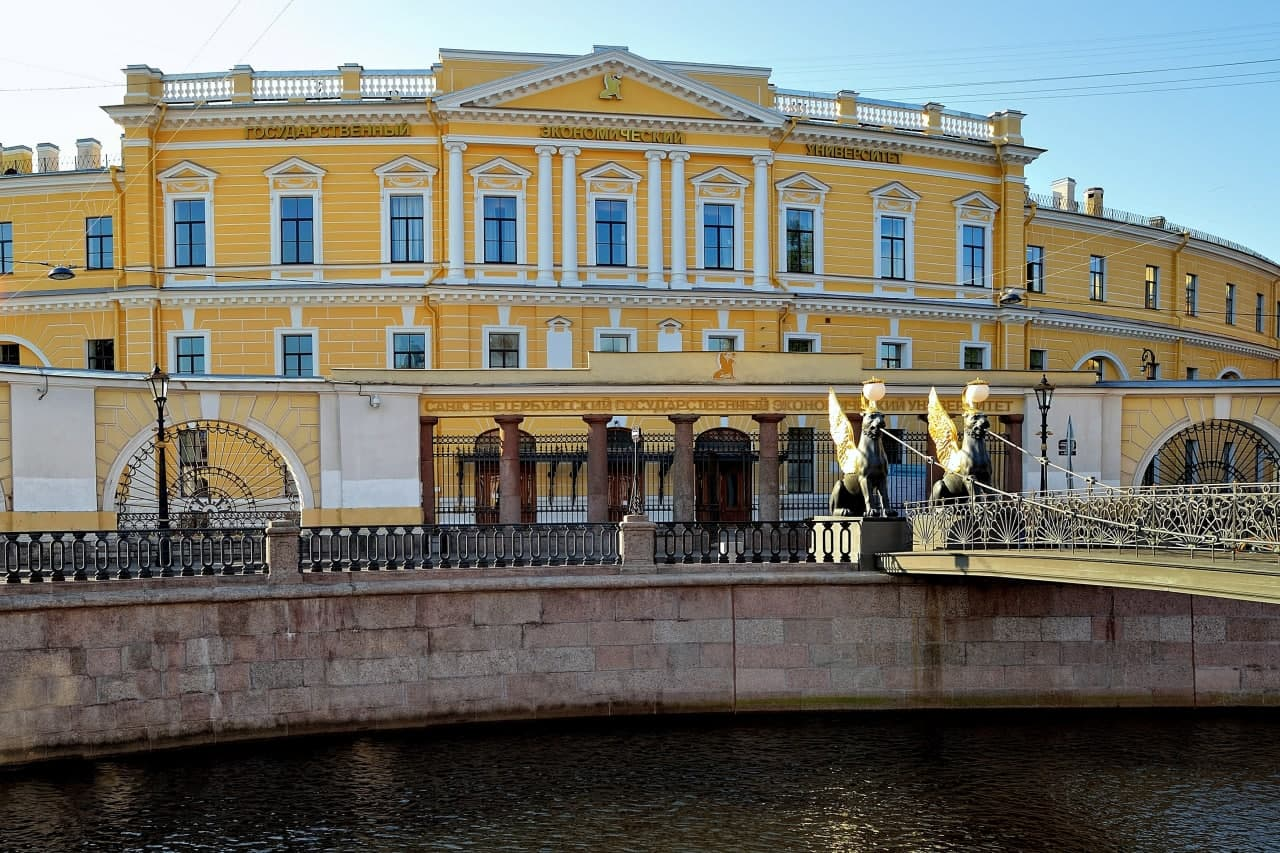
- Former names: Saint Petersburg State University of Economics and Finance, Saint Petersburg State University of Engineering and Economics, Saint Petersburg State University of Service and Economics
- Type: Public
- Established: 1930 (reorganized in 2012)
- Rector: Igor Maksimtsev
- Academic staff: 2,000+
- Students: 13,000+
- Location: 21, Sadovaya street, 191023, Saint Petersburg, Russia; 59.9313°N 30.3264°E
- Campus: Urban
- Colors: Turquoise, light green and purple
- Mascot: Griffin
- Website: www.unecon.ru
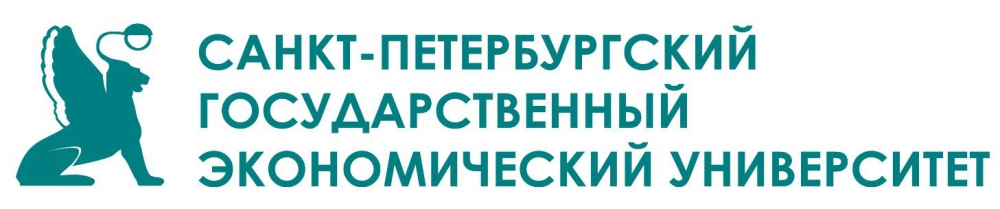

University rankings

Regional – Overall
- QS Emerging Europe and Central Asia: 251-300 (2022)

The Saint Petersburg University of Economics (UNECON, SPbSUE, Saint Petersburg State University of Economics; Russian: СПбГЭУ, Санкт-Петербургский государственный экономический университет) is a public university located in Saint Petersburg, Russia. It was formed in 2012 by merging Saint Petersburg State University of Economics and Finance, Saint Petersburg State University of Engineering and Economics, and Saint Petersburg State University of Service and Economics. The university consists of 7 faculties, 45 departments, has 1 branch and includes the College of Business and Technology.

== Campus ==
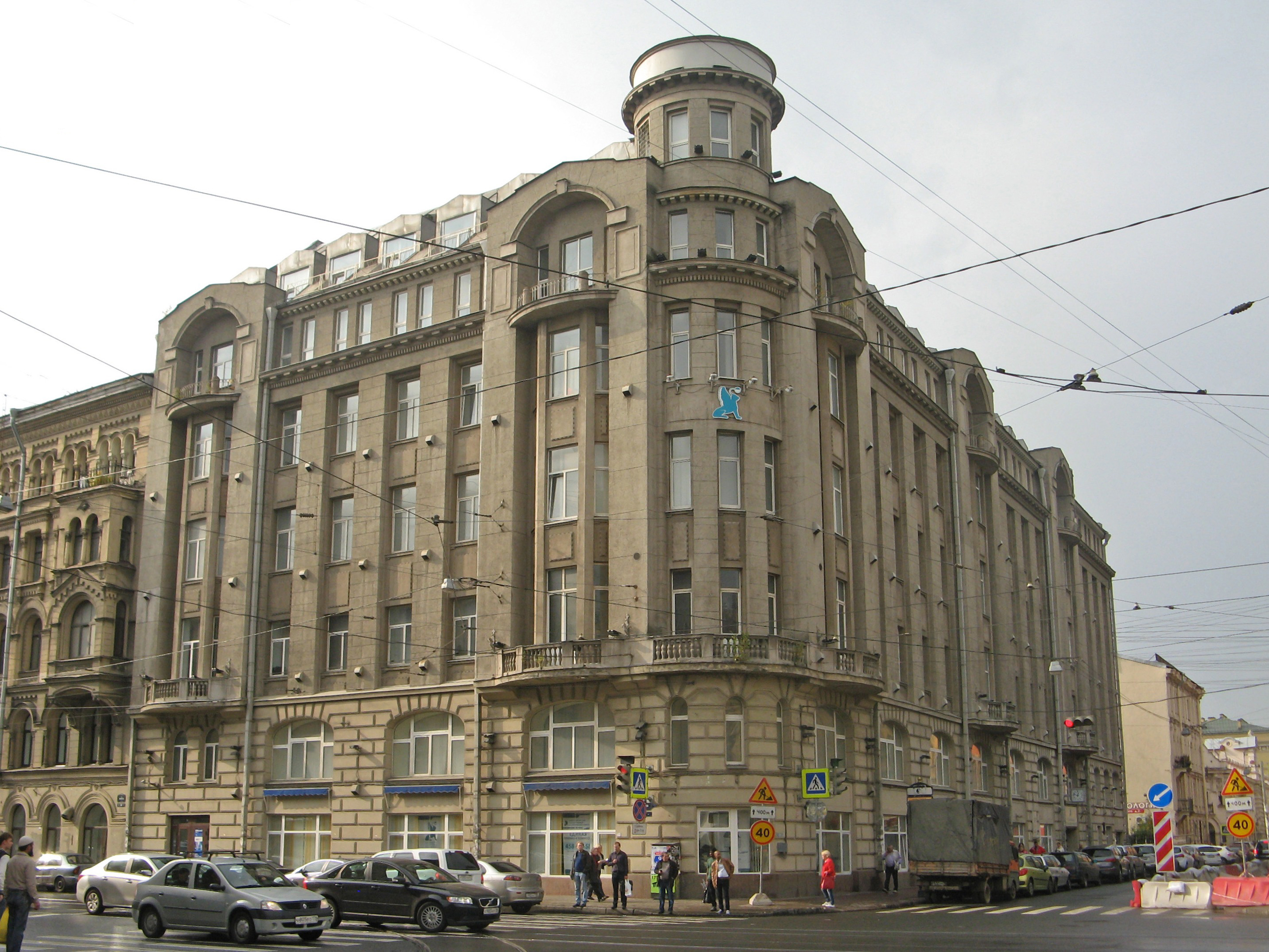
The Faculty of Management on Marata street

The campus is urban and consists of 24 buildings including 6 student dormitories.

=== Main Building ===
The university's main building and the seat of the rector and administration is the building of the former Russian Assignation Bank. The complex was erected on Sadovaya Street, by the decree of Catherine II of 1782. It was used by the Assignation Bank until 1817, then by the State Commercial Bank of the Russian Empire until 1860 and by its successor the State Bank of the Russian Empire until the Russian Revolution. In 1930 the building was granted to Leningrad Institute of Finance and Economics, the forerunner of Saint Petersburg University of Economics.

=== Cast Iron Railing ===
The cast iron railing along Sadovaya Street constitutes one of the essential components in the overall concept.

=== Bank Bridge ===
The Bank Bridge over the Griboyedov Canal connects Kazansky and Spassky Islands in the central area of St. Petersburg. The bridge was named after the Assignation Bank next to it.

=== Faculties ===
- Faculty of Economics and Finance
- Faculty of Humanities
- Faculty of Law
- Faculty of Computer Science and Applied Mathematics
- Faculty of Management
- Faculty of Business, Customs and Economic Security
- Faculty of Service, Tourism and Hospitality

== See also ==
- ENGECON Dubai
- List of higher education and academic institutions in Saint Petersburg
